= Cross Harbour ferry service =

Former transport in Sydney, Australia

Cross Harbour

- Pemulwuy at Milsons Point in November 2017
- Waterway: Port Jackson
- Owner: Sydney Ferries
- Operator: Transdev Sydney Ferries
- Began operation: 26 November 2017
- Ended operation: 24 October 2020
- No. of vessels: Emerald & SuperCat class
- No. of terminals: 8 wharves

The Cross Harbour ferry service, officially known as F4 Cross Harbour, was a commuter ferry service in Sydney, New South Wales. Part of the Sydney Ferries network, it was operated by Transdev Sydney Ferries and serviced the Darling Harbour, Lavender Bay, Rose Bay and Watsons Bay areas.

Introduced on 26 November 2017, the service replaced the entirety of the predecessor F4 Darling Harbour service and the Watsons Bay stopping pattern of the F7 Eastern Suburbs service. Emerald-class ferries and SuperCat ferries operated the service. On 25 October 2020, the service ceased and was split into F4 Pyrmont Bay and F9 Watsons Bay services.

== History ==
Prior to the introduction of the Cross Harbour route, service patterns on the Sydney Ferries network were often divided between wharves located west of Circular Quay, and wharves located east, with the exception of a short-lived service in the mid-1990s that linked McMahons Point and Rose Bay. (Note: A 1995 network map shows a route originating at Circular Quay, stopping at McMahons Point, and terminating at Rose Bay.) The Cross Harbour service is a successor to the Darling Harbour ferry service, which existed in many iterations between the 1980s and 2017. The new service was unveiled by the New South Wales Government on 27 March 2017.

Following community consultation jointly held by the ferry operator Transdev Sydney Ferries and Transport for NSW in 2019/20, the F4 route was divided into F4 Pyrmont Bay and F9 Watsons Bay services on 25 October 2020.

== Wharves ==
Wharves served by the F4 ferry

F4 wharves
| Name | Waterway | Other lines |
Pyrmont Bay – Watsons Bay
| Pyrmont Bay | Darling Harbour | none |
| Barangaroo | Darling Harbour | Parramatta River ferry service |
| Balmain East | Darling Harbour | Parramatta River ferry service |
| McMahons Point | Lavender Bay | Parramatta River ferry service |
| Milsons Point | Lavender Bay | Parramatta River ferry service |
| Circular Quay | Sydney Cove | Manly ferry service Taronga Zoo ferry service Parramatta River ferry service Neutral Bay ferry service Mosman Bay ferry service Double Bay ferry service Cockatoo Island ferry service |
| Rose Bay | Rose Bay | none |
| Watsons Bay | Watsons Bay | none |
