= Darling Harbour ferry wharf =

Darling Harbour ferry wharf may refer to the following, all located in Darling Harbour, in Sydney, Australia:

- Aquarium ferry wharf
- Barangaroo ferry wharf
- King Street Wharf
- Pyrmont Bay ferry wharf
