= Milsons Point =

- Suburb
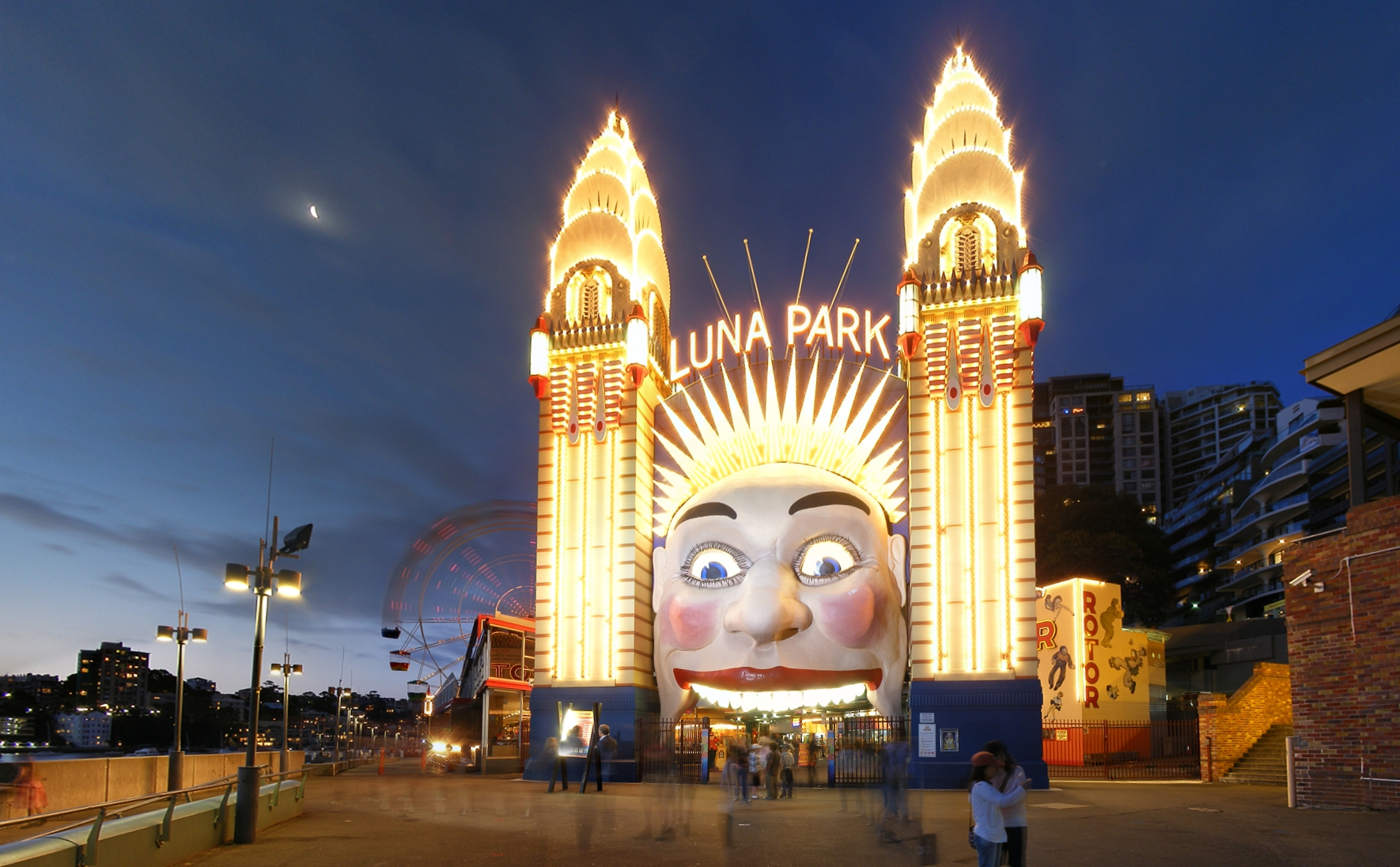
- Luna Park at Milsons Point

- Interactive map of Milsons Point
- Country: Australia
- State: New South Wales
- City: Sydney
- LGA: North Sydney
- Location: 3 km (1.9 mi) from CBD

Government
  - State electorate: North Shore
  - Federal division: Warringah

Area
  - Total: 0.2 km^{2} (0.077 sq mi)

Population
  - Total: 2,529 (2021 census)
  - Density: 13,000/km^{2} (33,000/sq mi)
- Postcode: 2061
Suburbs around Milsons Point
Lavender Bay	North Sydney	North Sydney
McMahons Point	Milsons Point	Kirribilli
	Dawes Point

Milsons Point is a suburb on the lower North Shore of Sydney, New South Wales, Australia. It is located three kilometres north of the Sydney central business district in the local government area of North Sydney.

Milsons Point is also the geographical feature that juts into Sydney Harbour from the northern side, directly opposite Sydney Cove, the spot where the first European settlement was established in 1788. It was named after James Milson, one of the earliest settlers.

== History ==
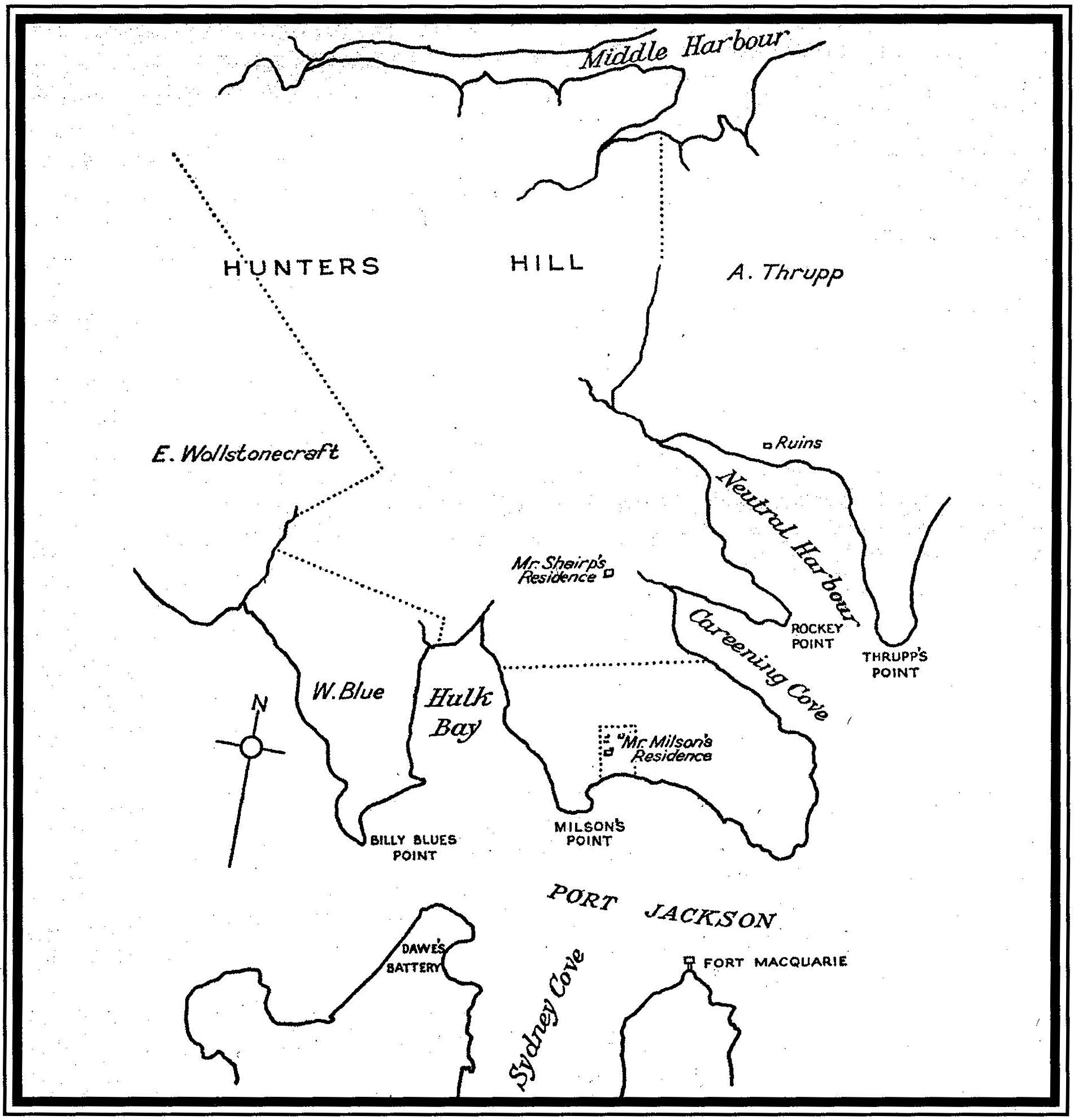
Sketch map of the Kirribilli area first published in 1955 in the book "The Life and Times of James Milson" showing approximate location of Milson's residence and that of his son-in-law William Shairp who married Milson's daughter Sophia in 1827. The perforated line marks the approximate boundary between Milson's 50 acres in the north and Campbell's 120 acres in the south.

Milsons Point was named after James Milson, a free settler originally from Lincolnshire. Milson settled in the area near Milsons Point and established a profitable business supplying ships with stone ballast, fresh water, and the produce of his dairy, orchard, and vegetable gardens. In the early 1820s, Milson settled in the vicinity of Jeffrey Street, Kirribilli, on 120 acres of land he leased from Robert Campbell. In 1824 Milson received a 50-acre grant of his own adjoining Campbell's land (which is marked on the 1840s map above). In 1826 a bushfire raged through the area destroying Milson's home, orchard and dairy and farm which he subsequently rebuilt (refer to 1840s map). In 1831 Campbell was involved with Milson in a court action over Milson's non-payment of the lease of the 120 acres. Milson lived in the vicinity of Jeffrey Street until 1831 when he built a new home, "Brisbane House", on his 50 acres facing Lavender Bay. The next home he built, also on his 50 acres, was called "Grantham". By the 1840s, Milson was leasing only the portion Campbell's 120 acres that contained Milson's orchard in the vicinity of Jeffrey Street. In 1872, Milson died at home at "Grantham" in the modern suburb of Milsons Point in what was then called the Municipality of East St Leonards.

The last of the family's holdings in the lower North Shore area were resumed in the early 1920s for the construction of the Harbour Bridge and associated roadways.

== Heritage listings ==
Milsons Point has a number of heritage-listed sites, including:

- North Shore railway line: Milsons Point railway station
- 1 Olympic Drive: Luna Park
- Bradfield Highway and North Shore railway line: Sydney Harbour Bridge

== Population ==
In the 2021 Census, there were 2,529 people in Milsons Point. 42.9% of people were born in Australia. The next most common countries of birth were China 7.2%, England 5.9%, India 4.2%, Hong Kong 4.0%, and Malaysia 2.4%. 59.0% of people only spoke English at home. Other languages spoken at home included Mandarin 8.0%, Cantonese 7.8%, Japanese 1.8%, Korean 1.8%, and Hindi 1.7%. The most common responses for religion were No Religion 39.9%, Catholic 19.6%, Anglican 9.9%, and Hinduism 4.3%.

== Transport ==
Milsons Point supports the northern end of the Sydney Harbour Bridge. Milsons Point is well connected with the CBD by the bridge, ferries and trains. The Warringah Freeway provides a link south to the Sydney CBD and north to Willoughby.

Milsons Point railway station is on the northern approach to the Sydney Harbour Bridge. Milsons Point ferry wharf, serviced by Parramatta River and Pyrmont Bay ferry services, is located to the west of the bridge in the south-west part of the suburb. Milsons Point is serviced by Busways, CDC NSW and Keolis Northern Beaches bus services that run to the Lower North Shore and Northern Beaches and Hills District. School buses leave from Bradfield Park to transport students to schools in North Sydney.

== Commercial area ==
Milsons Point has a mixture of residential and commercial development.

== Sport and recreation ==
Milsons Point has the entertainment centre Luna Park and the North Sydney Olympic Pool. On 4 October 1935, Luna Park was opened in Milsons Point on the northern edge of Sydney Harbour. The harbour-side amusement park features a collection of preserved fantasy architecture in the style of Art Deco.

== Schools ==
Schools in the area include the Catholic schools Loreto Kirribilli for girls and St Aloysius' College for boys.

A state school, Milsons Point Public School, opened in 1887. It was closed by the state government in 1990, despite earlier promises by Premier Nick Greiner that it would remain open and a legal challenge by the school's parents. The former campus was then purchased by St Aloysius' College in 1991 and converted into the college's junior school.

== Churches ==
- Chinese Christian Church

== Gallery ==
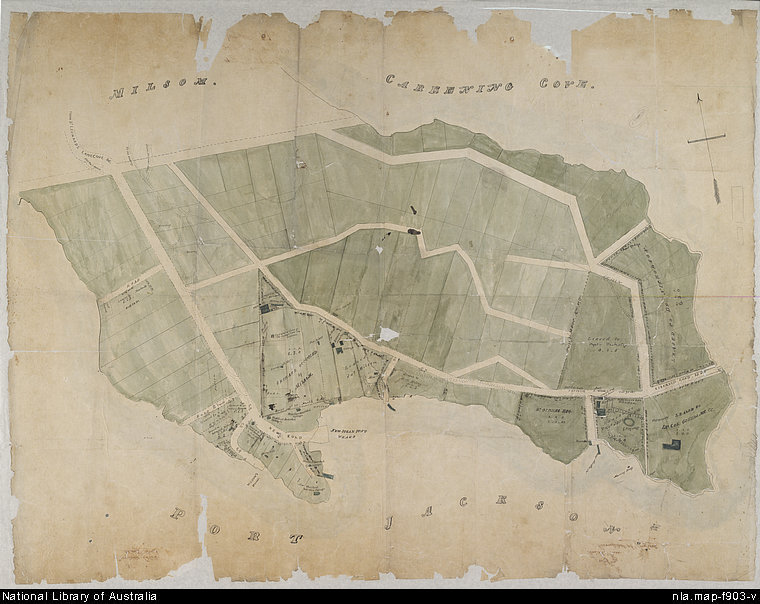
Earliest detailed map of Milsons Point (left) and Kirribilli Point (right): an 1840s subdivision map for the Estate of Robert Campbell. Improvements shown on the map are Milson's dairy and orchard located to the north of Milsons Point.

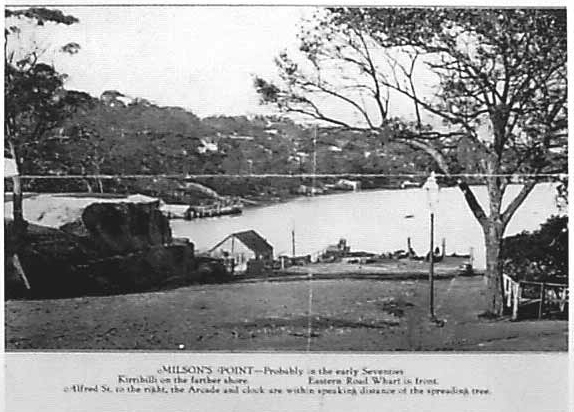
Postcard of Milsons Point. The caption reads: "Milson’s Point – Probably in the early Seventies [1870s]. Kirribilli on the farther shore. Eastern Road Wharf is front. Alfred St to the right, the Arcade and clock are within (illegible)ing distance of the spreading tree."

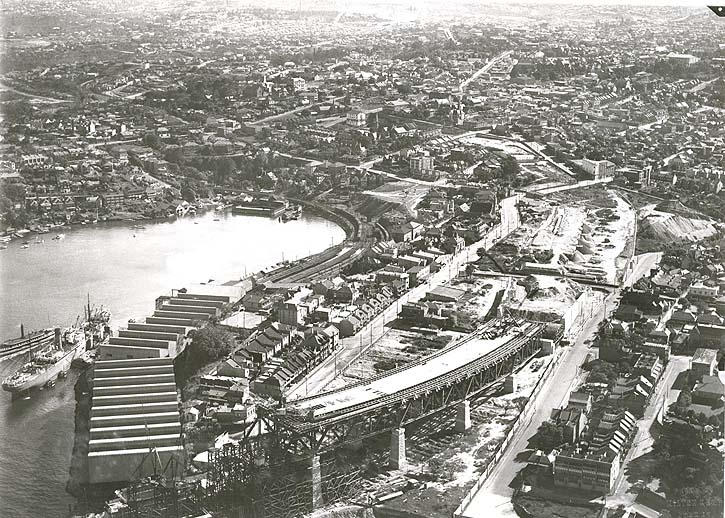
Aerial view of Milsons Point during construction of the Sydney Harbour Bridge

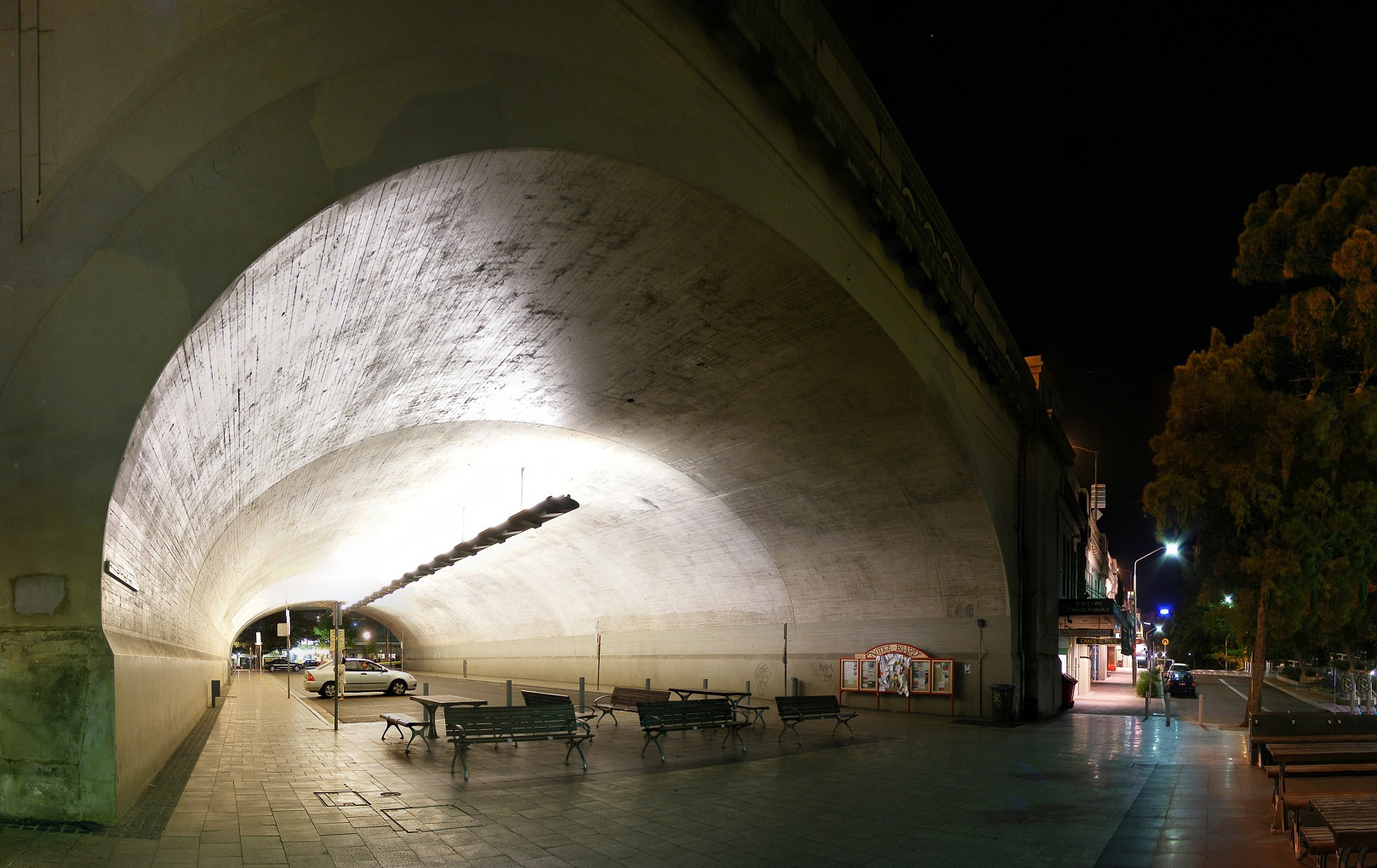
Access stairs and underpass tunnel for the Sydney Harbour Bridge, Milsons Point

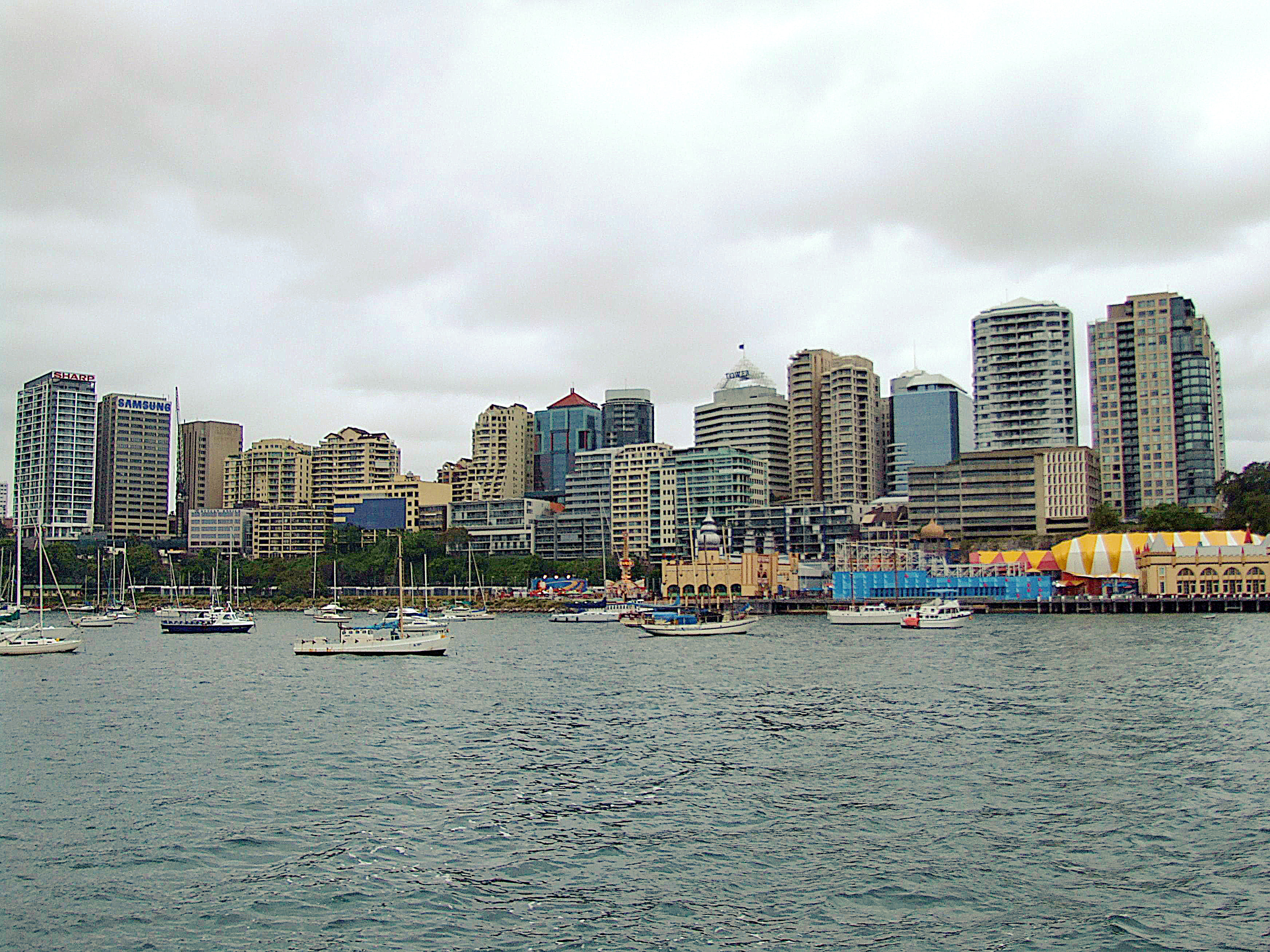
Lavender Bay (left) and Milsons Point (right) with North Sydney skyline in the background

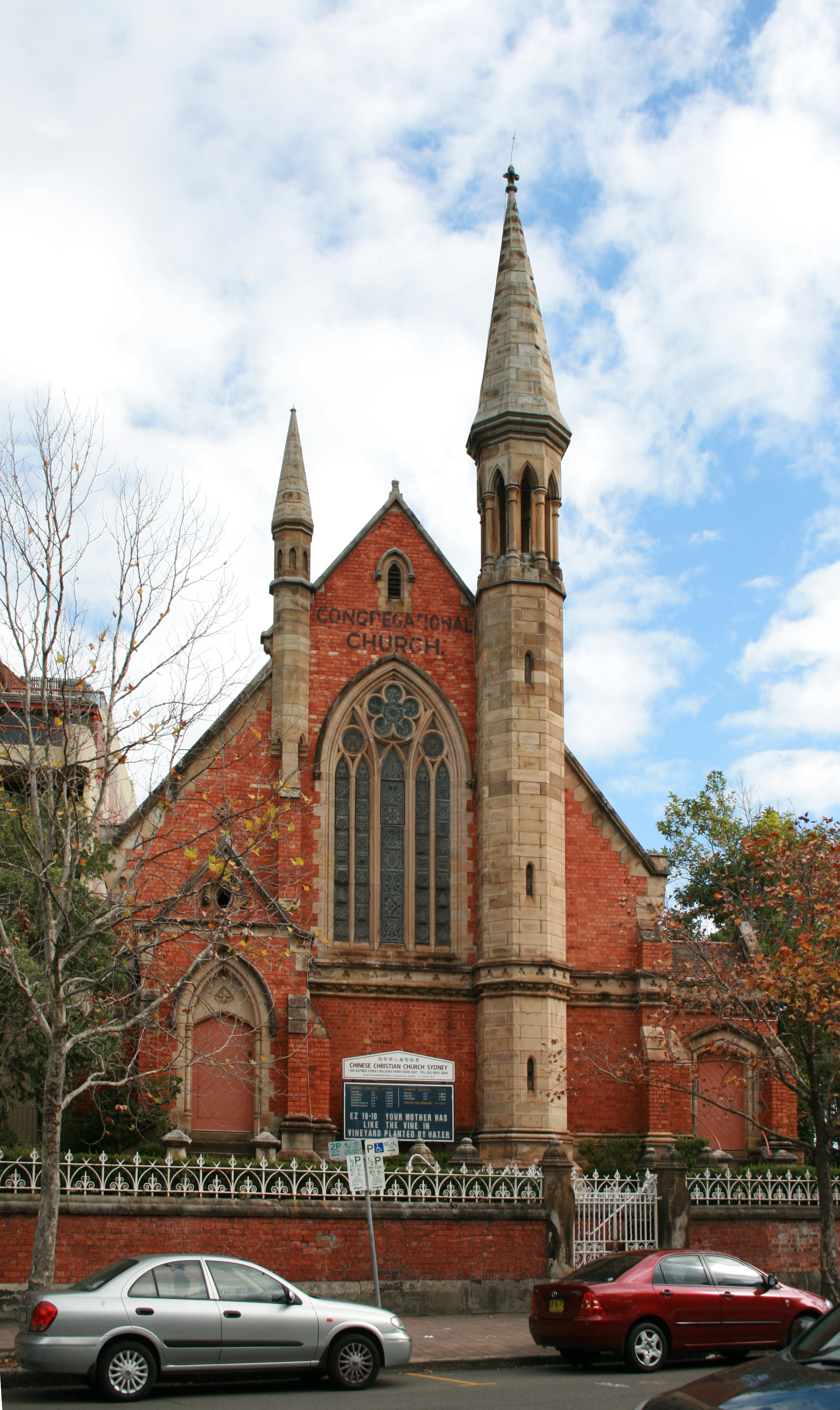
Chinese Christian Church Sydney uses a previously Congregational church building in Milsons Point

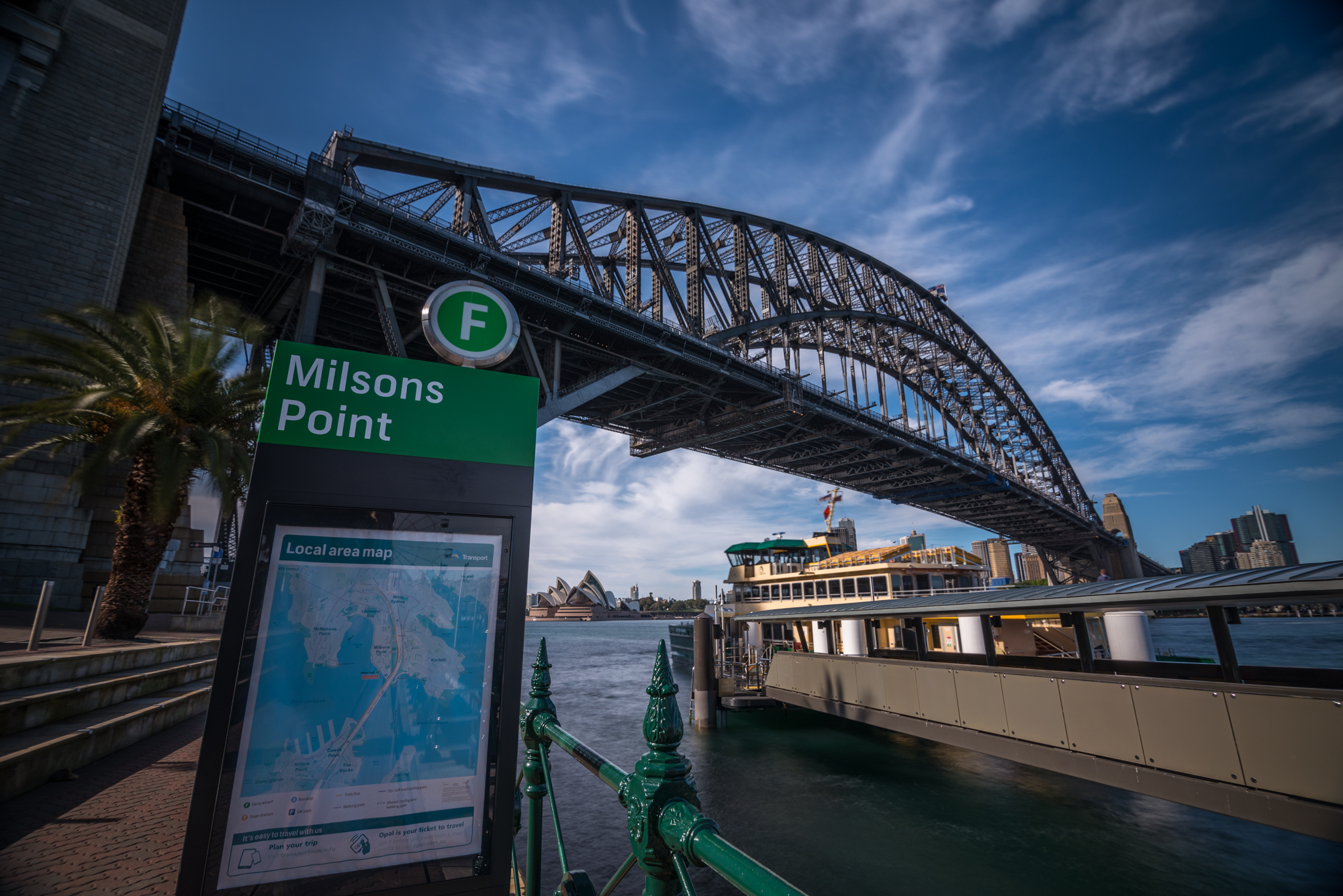
Milsons Point ferry wharf with the Sydney Harbour Bridge in background

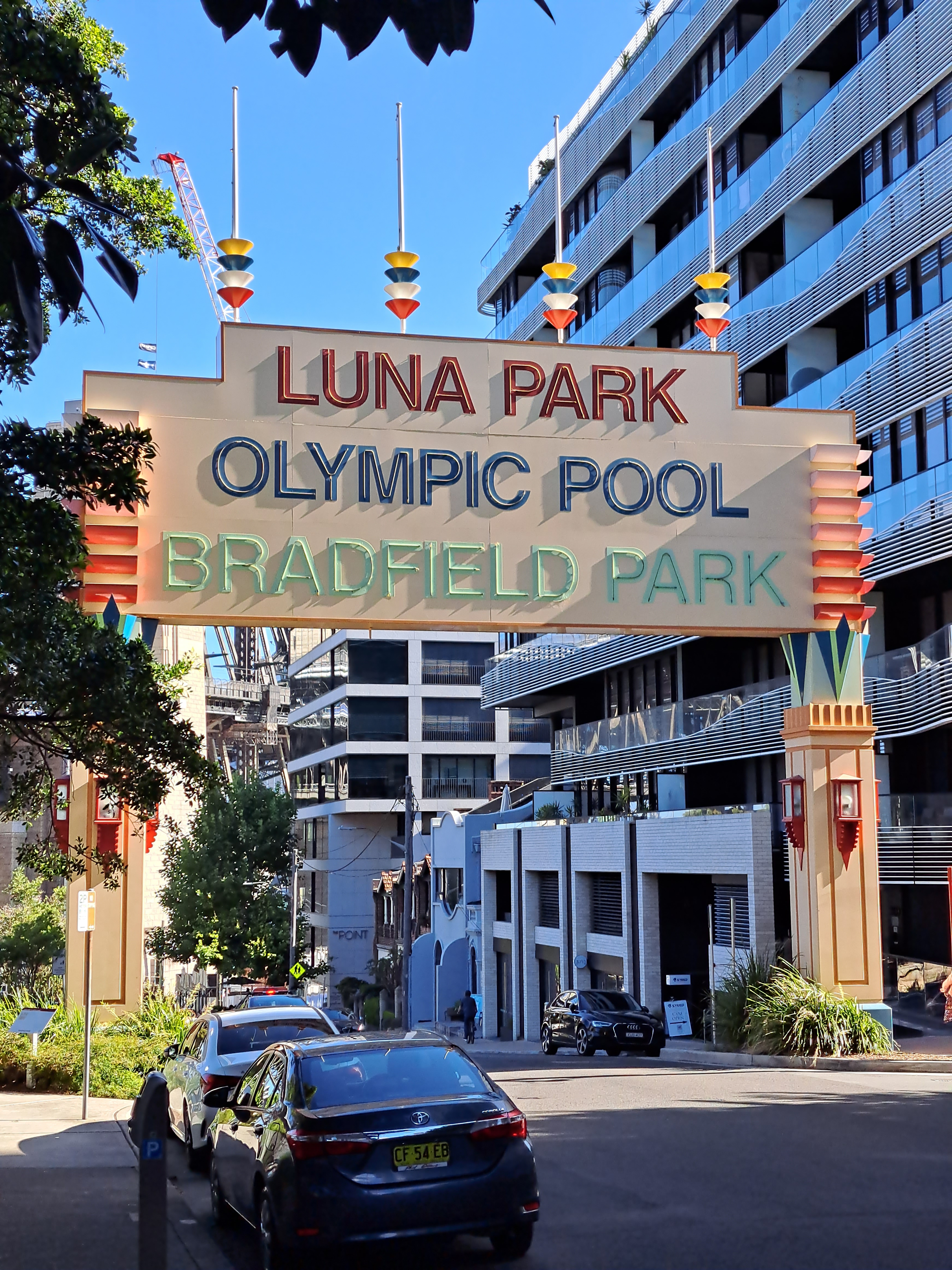
Welcome archway on Alfred St.
