= Aquarium ferry wharf =

Sydney Ferries ferry wharf

Aquarium
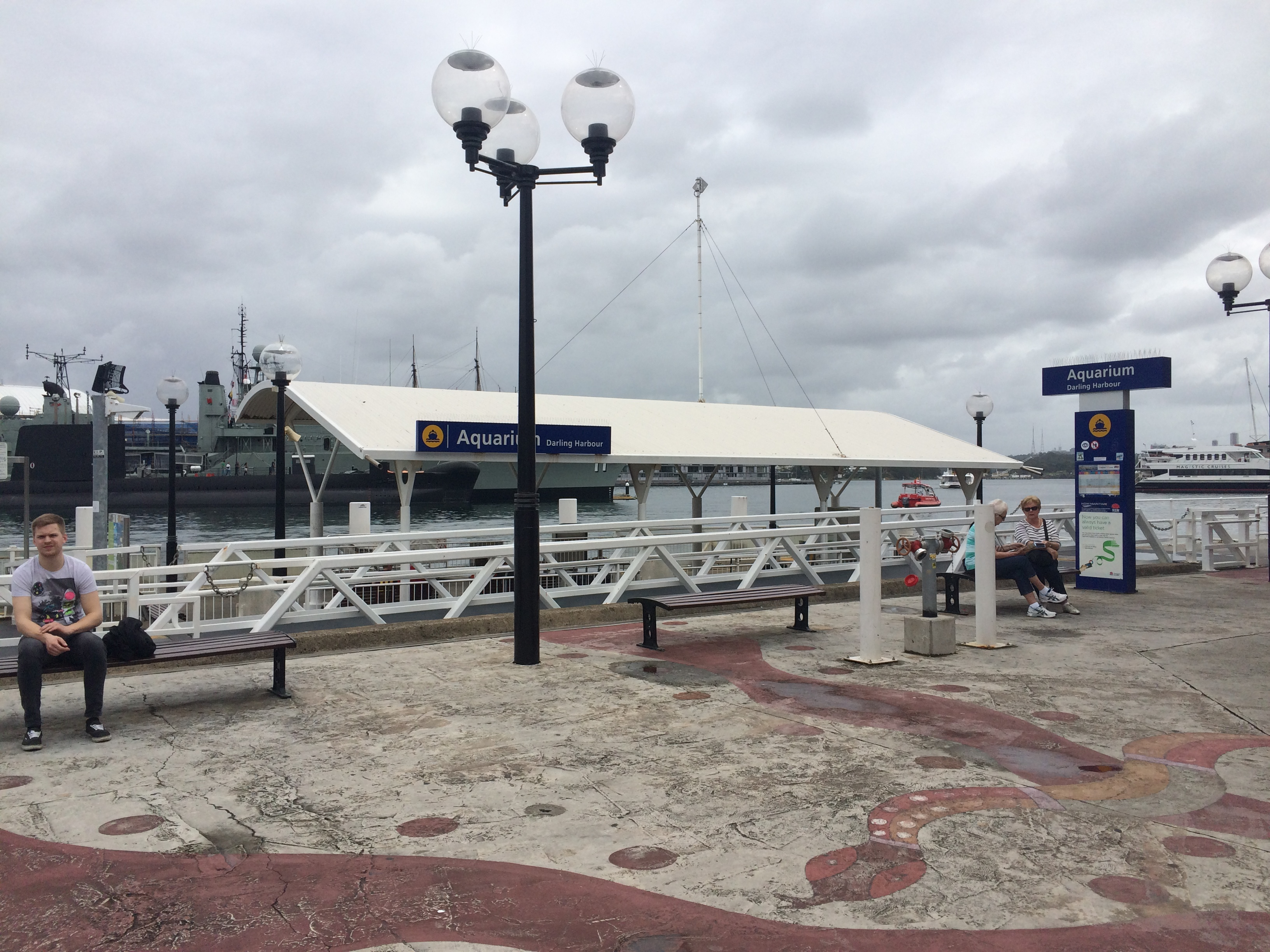
- View of the wharf entrance in March 2015

General information
- Location: Cockle Bay, Sydney; New South Wales; Australia
- Coordinates: 33°52′10.99″S 151°12′4.07″E
- Owner: Transport for NSW
- Operator: Manly Fast Ferry
- Platforms: 1 wharf (1 berth)

Other information
- Status: Staffed

History
- Former names: Aquarium (−1995); Darling Harbour (1995–2008)
Location

Aquarium ferry wharf (also known as Darling Harbour Aquarium ferry wharf) is a commuter wharf that serves the Darling Harbour precinct as well as the Sea Life Sydney Aquarium, which is right next to the wharf. The wharf, built in the 1980s as part of an initiative to deliver transport services to the then-newly redeveloped Darling Harbour, was originally part of the Sydney Ferries network. The wharf served as the terminus of Darling Harbour ferry services, until the wharf was decommissioned by Sydney Ferries in October 2010, when services to the wharf were rerouted to King Street Wharf 3 instead. Manly Fast Ferry currently handles services to the wharf, which acts as a terminus for their Manly - Darling Harbour Harbour loop service.

== History ==
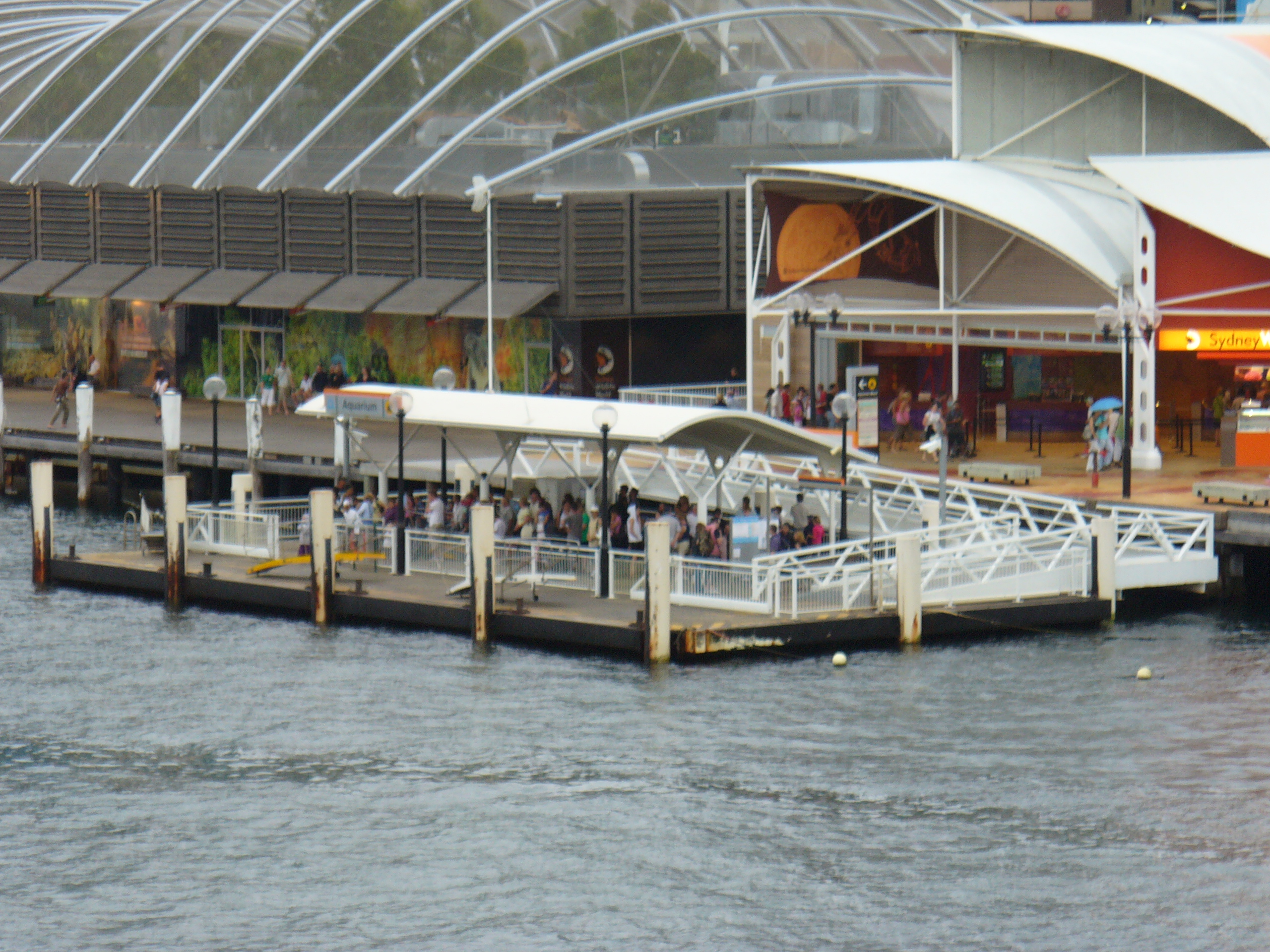
A crowded Aquarium wharf in late 2006, when Darling Harbour ferry services still ran to the wharf.

As part of the timetable changes of 10 October 2010, all Sydney Ferries services were moved to King Street Wharf 3 a few minutes' walk away.

== Summary ==
The wharf itself is situated directly outside the Sea Life Sydney Aquarium, and is immediately nearby the historic Pier 26. Entrance to the wharf is via a ramp that goes directly to the dock itself. Passengers who are waiting to board a ferry turn right at the end of the ramp and wait on the platform. Passengers who depart from a docked ferry can directly exit through the ramp, bypassing the platform altogether. The former ticket machine used by Sydney Ferries has since been converted to an emergency help point, though, tickets are still sold at the pier. They are sold by a ticket seller who goes behind a stand, situated in front of the former ticket machine, whenever a ferry docks.

== Services ==
Platform	Line	Stopping pattern	Notes
1	MDH	Morning loop service to Manly, Milsons Point, Pyrmont Bay, and back; Afternoon loop service to Pyrmont Bay, Milsons Point, Manly, and back; Evening service to Pyrmont Bay, Milsons Point, Circular Quay, and Manly	

== Gallery ==
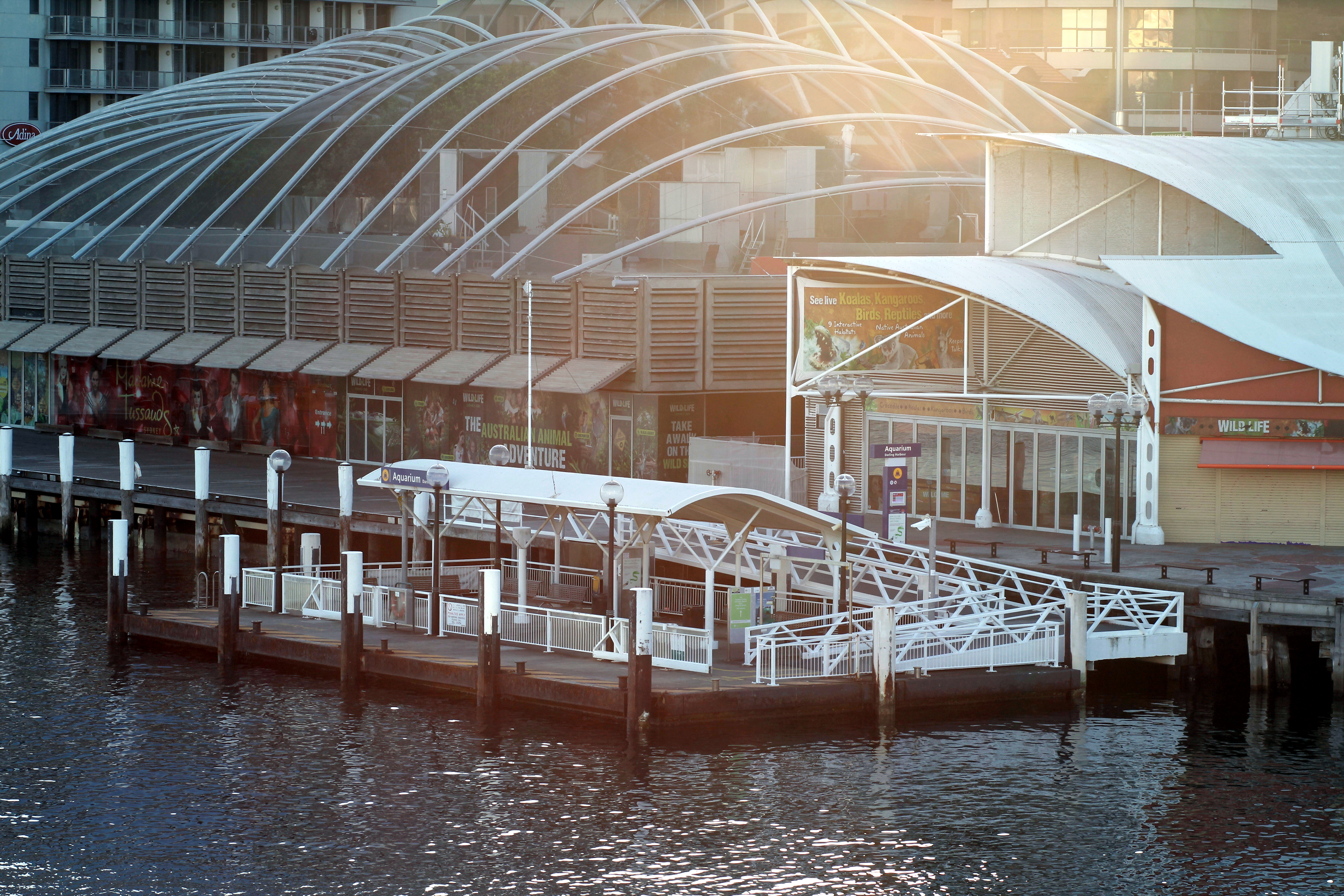
View of the entire wharf from across Darling Harbour in May 2014.

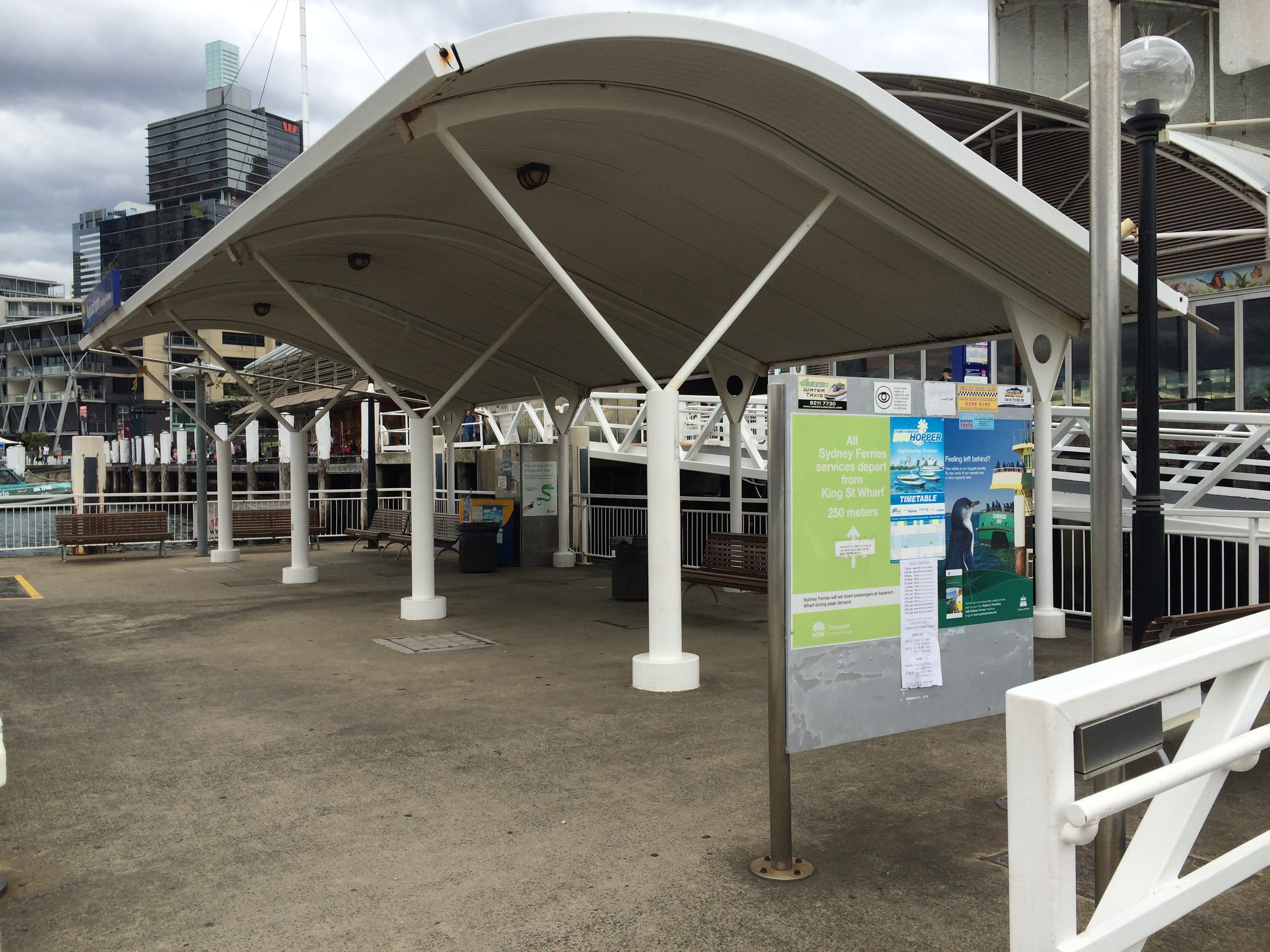
View across the wharf, looking north. The former ticket machine is visible at centre right of the image.

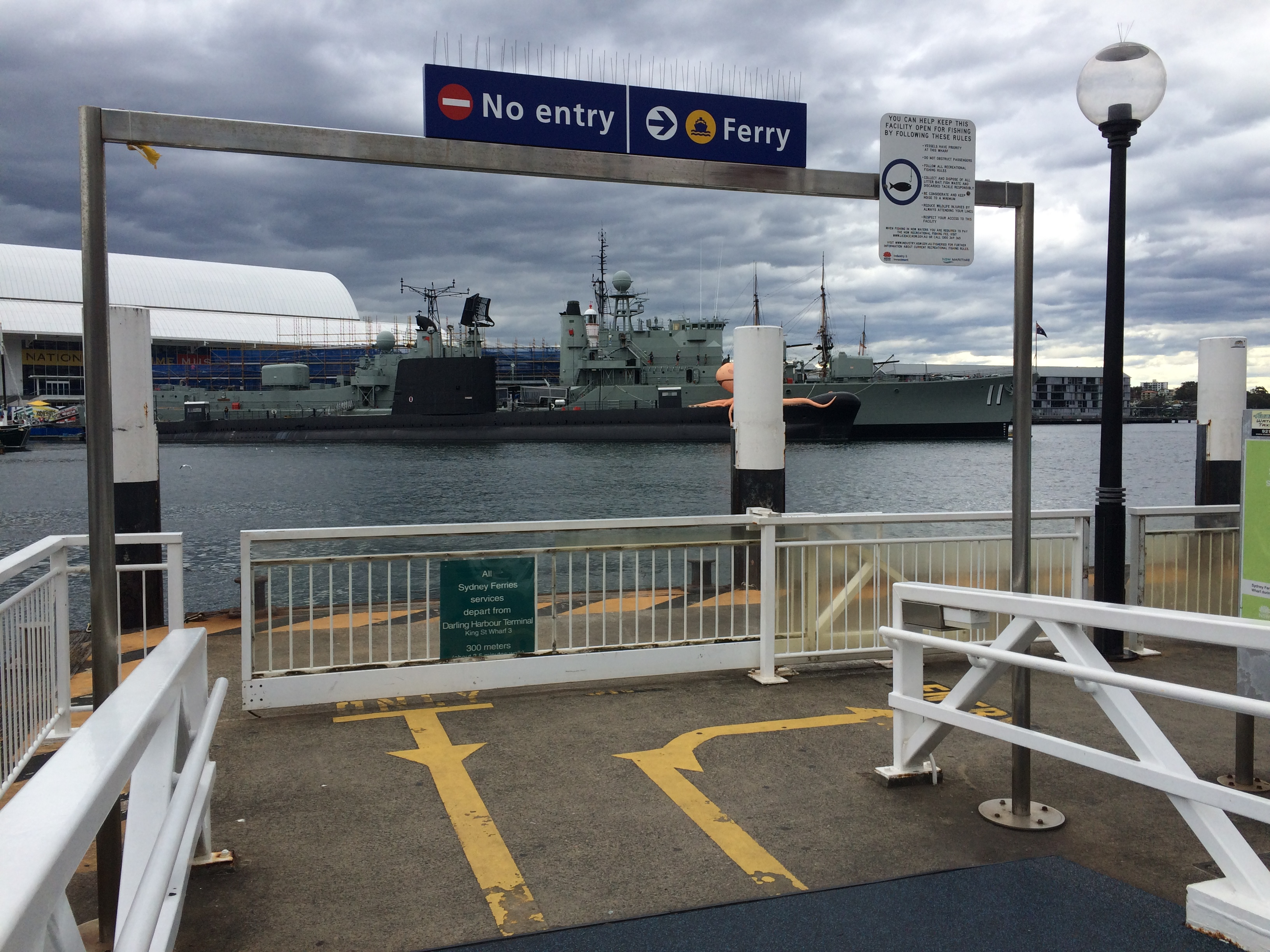
Ramp leading towards the wharf. Passengers getting off at Aquarium have a right-of-way, as signalled by the "No entry" sign and arrows on the ramp itself.

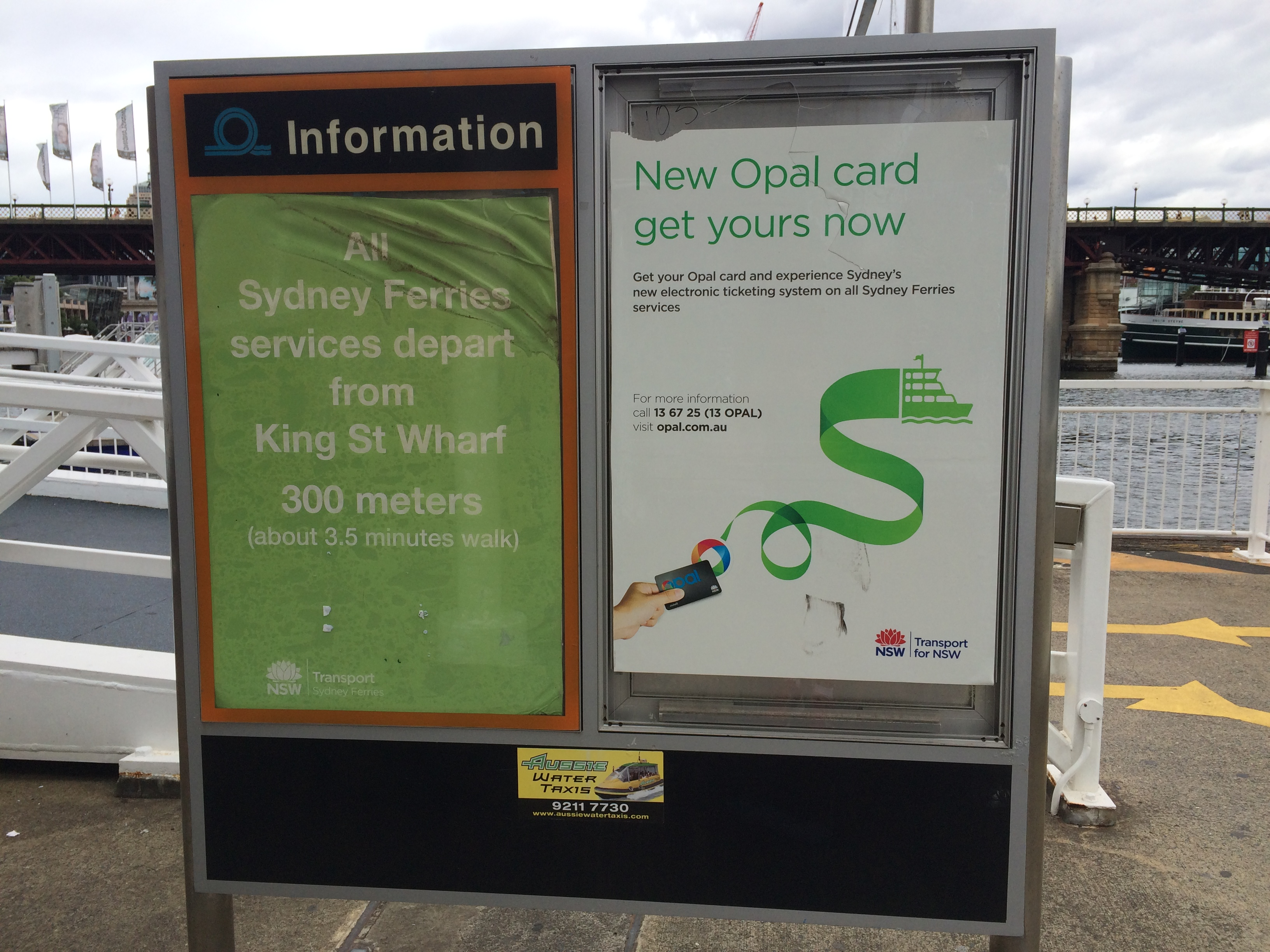
Notices at the wharf advising passengers to go to King Street Wharf 3 for Sydney Ferries services.
