= Barangaroo ferry wharf =

Ferry wharf in Sydney, Australia

Barangaroo
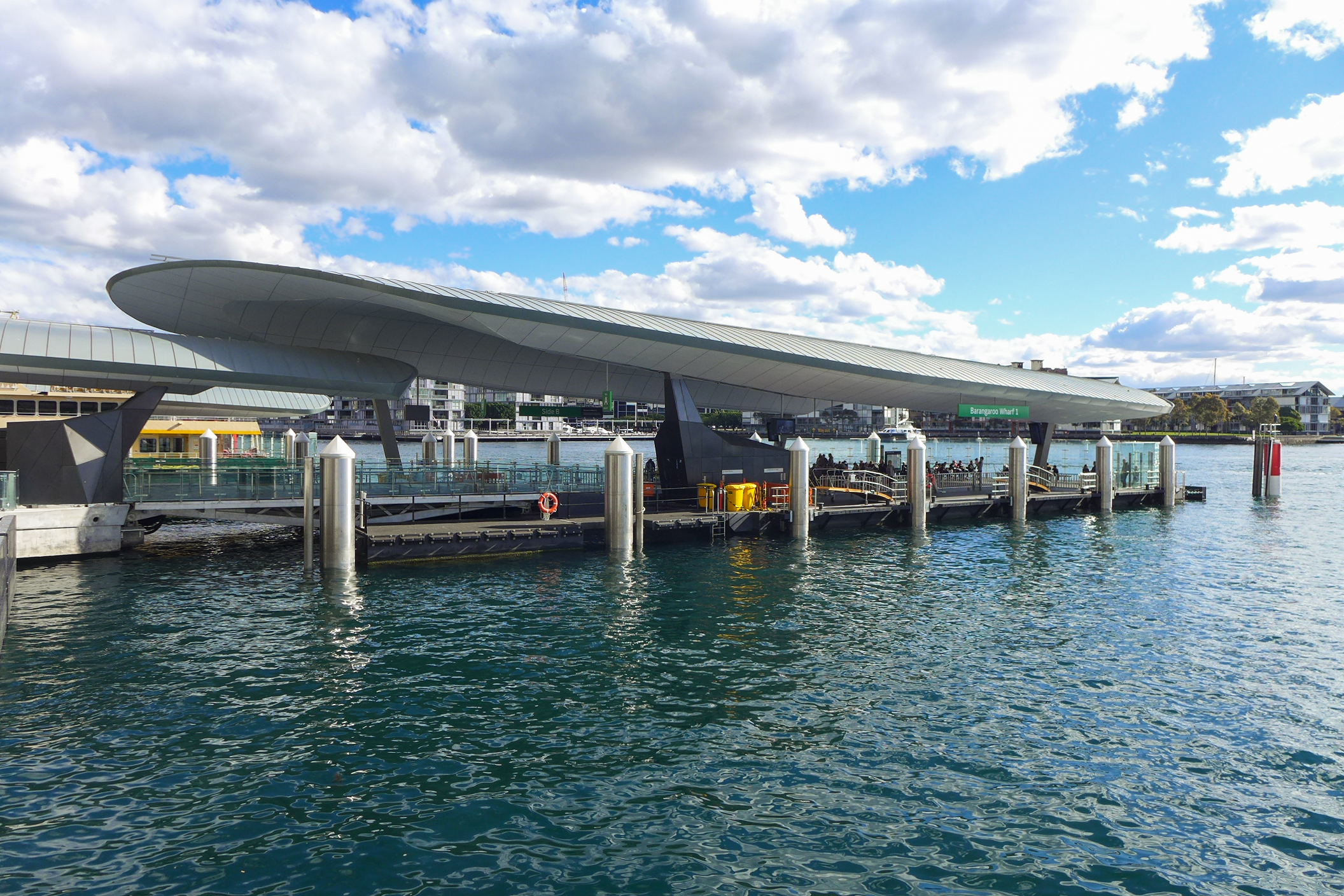
- View of the wharf in August 2017

General information
- Location: Wulugul Walk, Barangaroo; New South Wales; Australia
- Coordinates: 33°51′51″S 151°12′3″E
- Owner: Transport for NSW
- Operator: Transdev Sydney Ferries
- Platforms: 2 wharves (4 berths)
- Connections: Barangaroo; Wynyard

Construction
- Accessible: Yes

Other information
- Status: Staffed

History
- Opened: 26 June 2017

Services
Preceding wharf	Sydney Ferries	Following wharf
McMahons Point towards Circular Quay	F3 Parramatta	Balmain East towards Parramatta
Balmain East towards Circular Quay	F4 Pyrmont Bay	Pyrmont Bay Terminus
Terminus	F10 Blackwattle Bay	Pirrama Park towards Blackwattle Bay
Location

Barangaroo ferry wharf are two ferry wharves located on the eastern side of Darling Harbour, in Sydney, New South Wales, Australia. The wharves are the major public transport link of the Barangaroo precinct, situated west of the Sydney central business district. The complex consists two wharves, with provision for a third wharf in the future. It is serviced by Sydney Ferries' F3 Parramatta River, F4 Pyrmont Bay, and F10 Blackwattle Bay services. It opened on 26 June 2017.

Barangaroo was built on the premise of being a second major terminal for the Sydney Ferries network, after Circular Quay. The third ferry wharf in the history of the Sydney Ferries network to be situated in Darling Harbour, it serves as a replacement for King Street Wharf 3, designed as a long-term solution to a conclusion made by the Walker Report, which called for easing of congestion through a second terminal at Darling Harbour.

== History ==
=== Background ===
Ferry services to the Darling Harbour precinct were originally serviced by the Darling Harbour Aquarium wharf. This was the only wharf to service Darling Harbour until Pyrmont Bay was opened in the early 2000s. (Note: Aquarium Wharf shows up in a colo Ferries map from 1999, and shows up in a 2006 map, dating the opening of the Pyrmont Bay wharf to the early 2000s.) In 2007, the Walker Report recommended a new ferry terminal at Darling Harbour be built to ease congestion on the network, especially at Circular Quay. The wharf was to be situated at the Darling Harbour wharf, and services to the Aquarium wharf, 250 metres to the east, phased out. (Note: (Chapter Three, Page 55) "One partial solution to the congestion at Circular Quay is for SFC to develop an additional CBD hub at King Street wharf... SFC currently has exclusive use of King Street No 3 wharf.") Thus Darling Harbour wharf, which was a stop on the Parramatta River service, was chosen as a site for a new terminal. The Aquarium wharf continued to operate as part of Darling Harbour ferry services until 10 October 2010, when as part of a new timetable change all Sydney Ferries services were diverted to Darling Harbour.

The Barangaroo area, which had been a derelict port for years, had been a long-proposed site for urban renewal. Following proposals put forward by the Sydney Harbour Foreshore Authority and reviews by the O'Farrell State Government, major construction and redevelopment at Barangaroo began in 2011. In May 2013, the State Government outlined plans to build a new terminal at Barangaroo to replace Darling Harbour. As well as allowing for additional services on the F3 Parramatta River route, the increased capacity will allow other routes, such as a then-envisioned potential extension of the F7 Eastern Suburbs route, to also use the new wharves. It was proposed that all Sydney Ferries routes that used the Darling Harbour wharf will be rerouted to Barangaroo, with Darling Harbour to be decommissioned and handed back to private operation.

=== Construction ===
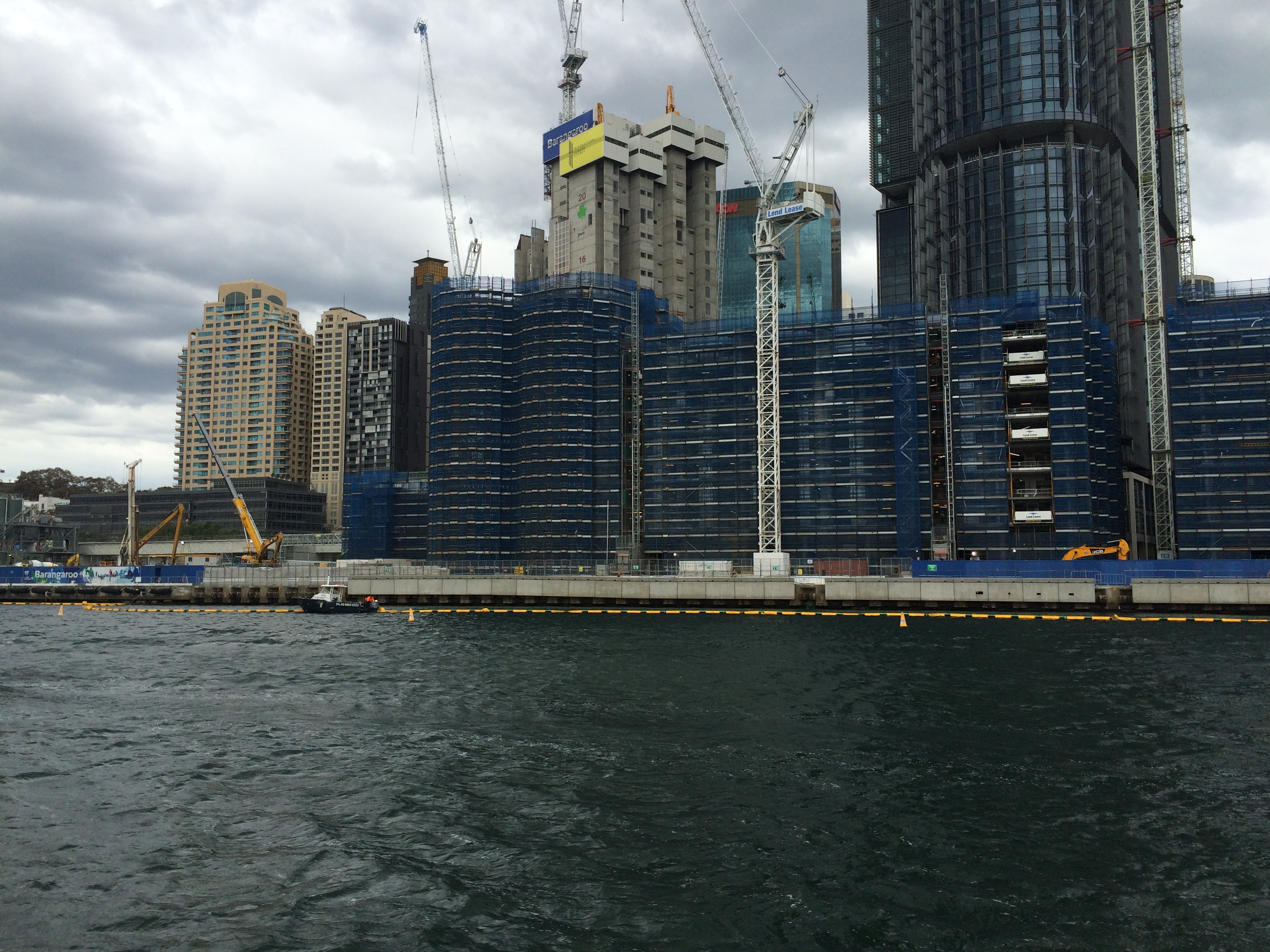
Pre-construction activities at the site of the wharf at Barangaroo South in April 2015.

Construction was originally scheduled to commence in 2015, with the wharves to open in 2016. In April 2015, Transport for NSW issued Invitations to Tender to three companies to build the wharves. A contract was awarded to McConnell Dowell later in September. Over the time period of the wharf's construction, it was alleged by the Construction, Forestry, Mining and Energy Union that over 1,500 incidents concerning worker safety occurred on the wharf.

On 1 March 2017, during the latter stages of the wharf's construction, a worker was killed after being accidentally struck with a metal large header beam whilst working on a construction barge. The man was killed instantaneously and declared dead at the scene. An investigation into the incident was initiated by SafeWork NSW and the New South Wales Police Force shortly afterward. The accident sparked attention from local and national media, whom emphasised the "tragic" narrative of the incident; the man being married and father to a 14-month old son at the time of his death.

Following investigation, McConnell Dowell, the Principal Contractor for the project and their sub-contractor Brady Marine were prosecuted. Both were found guilty of failing to comply with the Health and Safety Act and fined A$500,000 and $450,000 respectively.

=== Opening ===
The wharf was completed in late June 2017, estimated to have cost $59 million to build overall. The first ferry to arrive at the wharf, on the morning 26 June 2017, was the MV Fred Hollows, which had entered service onto the Sydney Ferries network as the first Heritage-class ferry, the same day. The ceremonial first service was attended by Berejiklian and Constance, whom officially opened the wharf upon arrival. The wharf's opening followed the decommissioning of the nearby Darling Harbour / King Street Wharf 3, with the wharf returning to private hands upon its last Sydney Ferries services on the night of 25 June 2017, with Barangaroo serving as its replacement as intended. The wharf initially services the F3 Parramatta River and F4 Darling Harbour routes, both from wharf 1 of the complex, while wharf 2 remains closed. Changes to the F3 and F4 timetables also came into effect on 26 June 2017, to accommodate for the opening of Barangaroo and decommissioning of Darling Harbour.

== Design ==
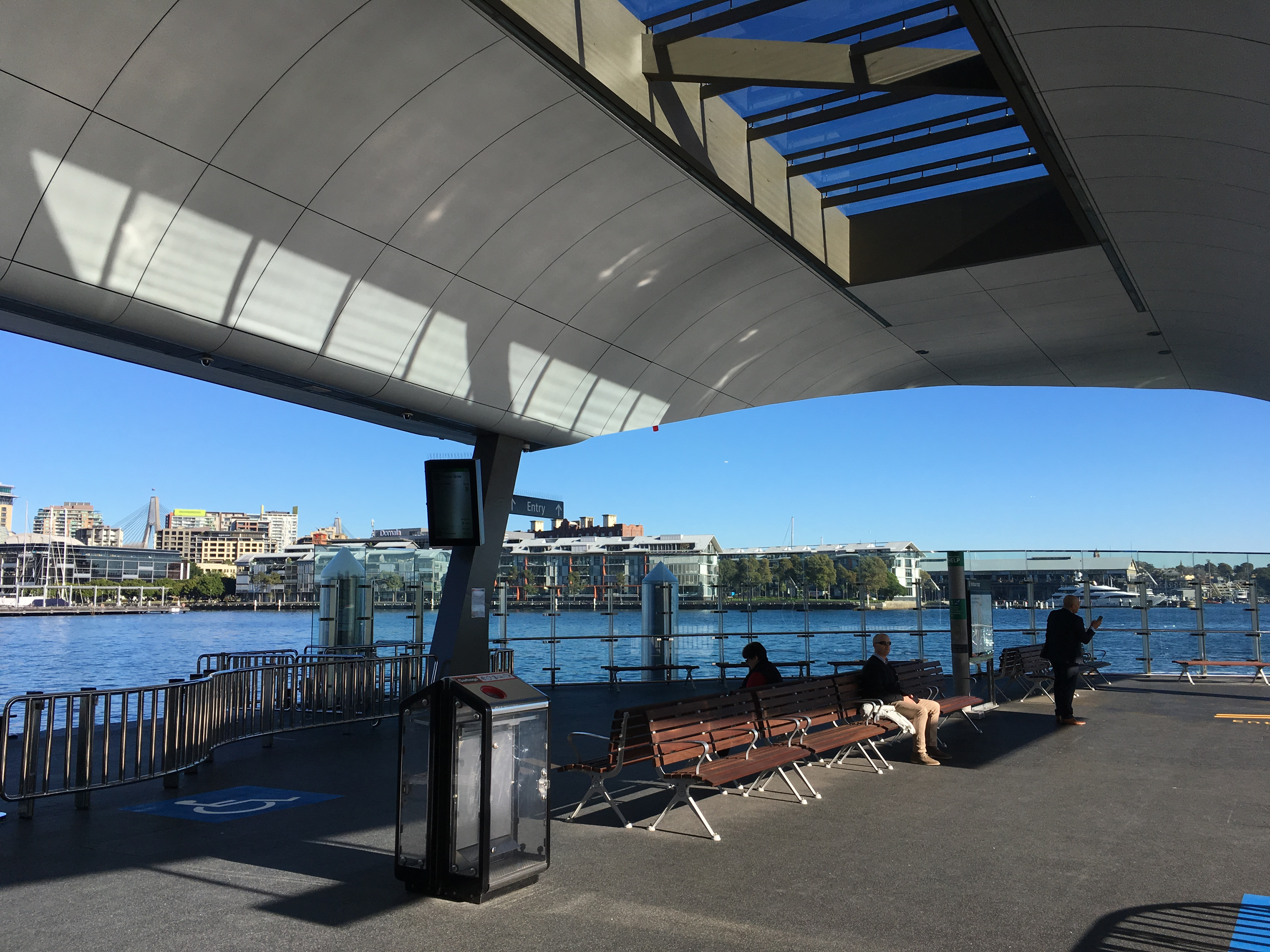
Resting area for commuters at wharf 1. The berths of the wharf are located at the left and right side of the image.

Both wharves at Barangaroo are measured at 48 meters long and 23 meters wide, with both wharves being able to accommodate a maximum of eight ferries at any given time, with two on each of its four berths. Designed by Aurecon and Cox Architecture, whom had previously helped design the wharves of Brisbane's ferry network, the complex is similar to the design of wharves on Sydney Harbour redeveloped in the 2010s, with large, "curved silver roofs" as the artistic centerpiece of the structure. The complex also features "fully accessible pontoons, seated waiting areas, weather protection, [and] real-time service information", with open, ungated access accompanied by opal card reader nodes at the entrance to both wharves. Lead architect David Holm stated that the wharf's design was crafted with the "language that is consistent with the suite of Sydney harbour ferry wharves" in mind, describing the "twofold" process of resolving function and identity. He further commented that the wharf's function, the "delivery of streamlined passenger flows and a simplicity of functional layout" was contrasted with its identity, an "expression of Sydney harbour's iconic maritime history and architectural form.

The wharf's location on Barangaroo's Wulugul Walk enables direct access to the Sydney central business district; it also enables a transport interchange link to Wynyard railway station through the Wynyard Walk, an underground pedestrian tunnel purpose-built to allow direct access between the station and Barangaroo.

== Services ==
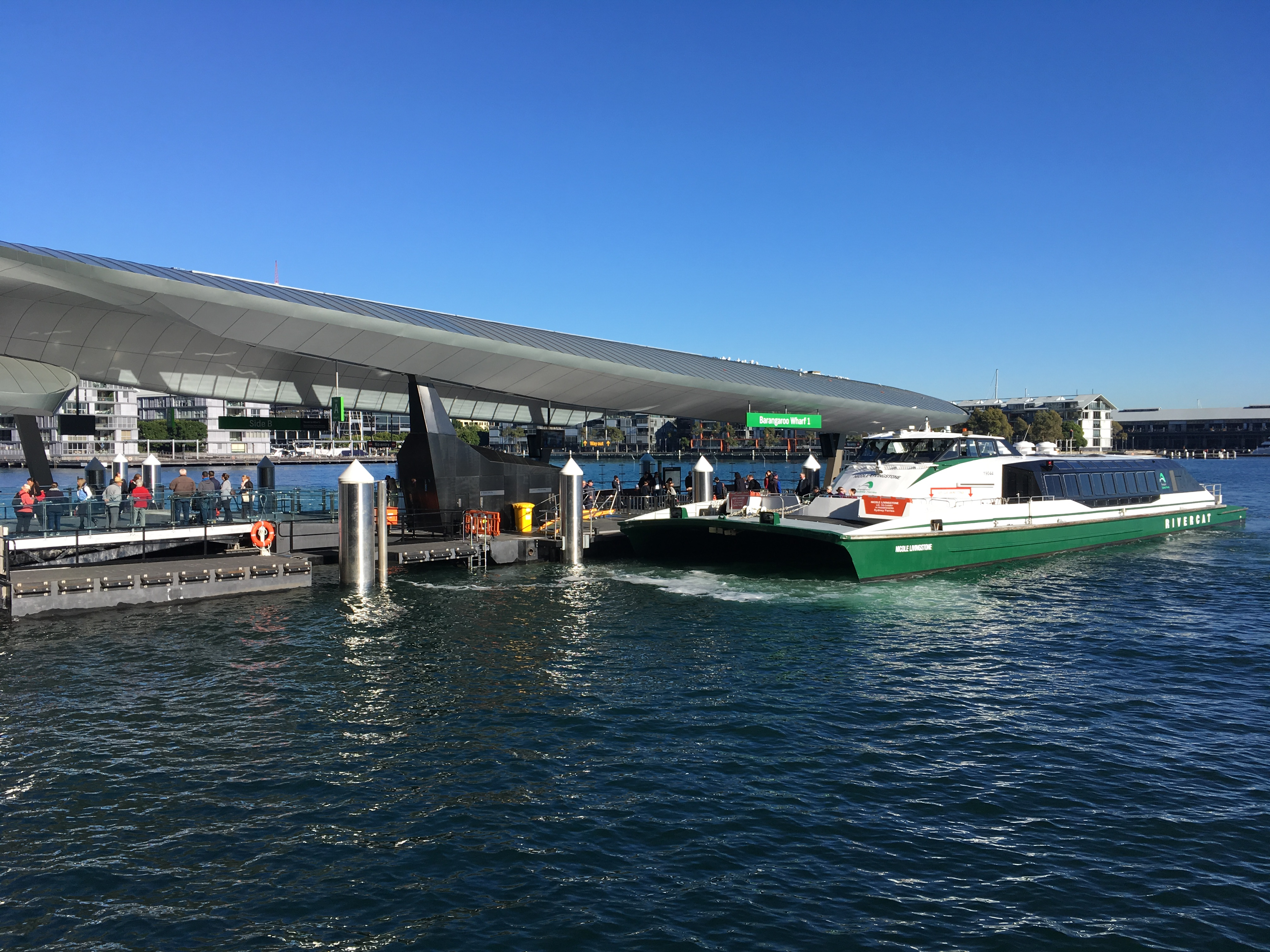
The MV Nicole Livingstone berthed at Barangaroo wharf in June 2017

Barangaroo Wharf consists of four platforms on two wharves. Wharf 1's Side A berth is not in use, while the Side B berth hosts ferries travelling on the F3 Parramatta River to Parramatta or Circular Quay service. Wharf 2's Side A berth hosts ferries operating on the F4 Pyrmont Bay to Pyrmont Bay and F10 Blackwattle Bay to Blackwattle Bay services, while the Side B berth hosts ferries travelling on the F4 Pyrmont Bay to Circular Quay service and provisions will be made for a potential third wharf in the future. Initially, the wharves are expected to be used by up to 11 vessels per hour during weekday peak periods and 14 vessels per hour all day on weekends.

Wharf	Line	Stopping Pattern	Notes
1	Parramatta River ferry service	Services to Circular Quay	
1	Parramatta River ferry service	Services to Parramatta and Sydney Olympic Park; Evening Peak hour services starting at Barangaroo to Cabarita and Sydney Olympic Park stopping all stops from Drummoyne	
2 Side A	Blackwattle Bay ferry service	Services to Blackwattle Bay	
2 Side A	Pyrmont Bay ferry service	Services to Pyrmont Bay	
2 Side B	Pyrmont Bay ferry service	Services to Circular Quay via Milsons Point	

== Transport links ==
Sydney Trains services are available from nearby Wynyard station, accessible via Wynyard Walk.

Bus services:

- 311: Millers Point to Railway Square
- 324: Walsh Bay to Watsons Bay via Vaucluse Heights
- 325 Walsh Bay to Watsons Bay via Vaucluse

Barangaroo metro station is located nearby and provides a direct connection to the Hills District and Sydenham on the Metro North West & Bankstown Line.
