= McMahons Point ferry wharf =

Ferry wharf in Sydney, Australia

McMahons Point
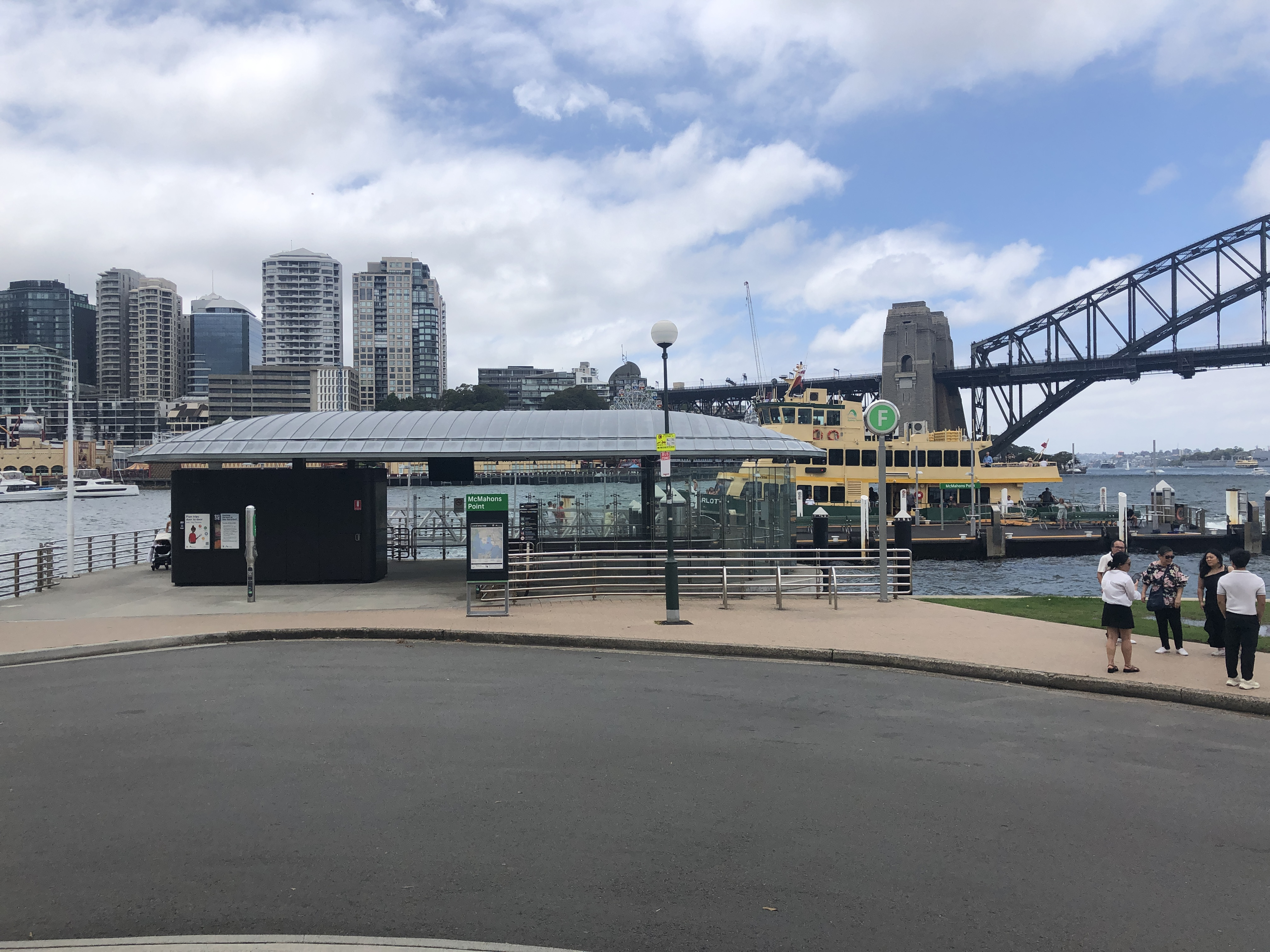
- Henry Lawson Avenue entrance in December 2024

General information
- Location: Henry Lawson Avenue, McMahons Point; New South Wales; Australia
- Coordinates: 33°50′55″S 151°12′23″E
- Owner: Transport for NSW
- Operator: Transdev Sydney Ferries
- Platforms: 1 wharf (2 berths)
- Connections: Buses

Construction
- Accessible: Yes

Other information
- Status: Unstaffed

History
- Rebuilt: 2016

Services
Preceding wharf	Sydney Ferries	Following wharf
Milsons Point towards Circular Quay	F3 Parramatta peak hour only	Barangaroo towards Parramatta
Milsons Point towards Circular Quay	F4 Pyrmont Bay	Balmain East towards Pyrmont Bay
Location

McMahons Point ferry wharf is located on the northern side of Sydney Harbour in the suburb of McMahons Point. It is served by Sydney Ferries Parramatta River and Pyrmont Bay services.

== History ==
There has been a wharf at McMahons Point since at least 1839, when Blues Point Road was gazetted as a thoroughfare from there to the township of St Leonards. At the beginning of the 20th century, a large number of passenger ferries plied the route between here and the city, with services operating every 10 to 15 minutes. Six million passengers a year were served by the wharf. A tramway opened in 1909 to bring more commuters to the wharf.

When the Sydney Harbour Bridge opened in 1932 the ferry services became redundant, and in 1935 small ferries operated by Hegarty Ferries took over the runs formerly operated by the larger ferries of Sydney Ferries Limited to McMahons Point. The wharf has since again become part of the Sydney Ferries network.

The wharf closed on 13 April 2016 to be replaced by a larger structure. The new wharf is at a 90-degree angle to the shore and has two sides. It reopened on 20 October 2016.

== Services ==
Platform	Line	Stopping pattern	Notes
1	Parramatta River ferry service	Morning services to Circular Quay; Evening services to Parramatta	
1	Pyrmont Bay ferry service	Services to Circular Quay & Pyrmont Bay	

== Transport links ==
Busways operates two bus routes to and from McMahons Point wharf:

- 254: to Riverview
- 291: to Epping station
