= King Street, Sydney =

Street in Sydney, Australia

King Street, Sydney New South Wales
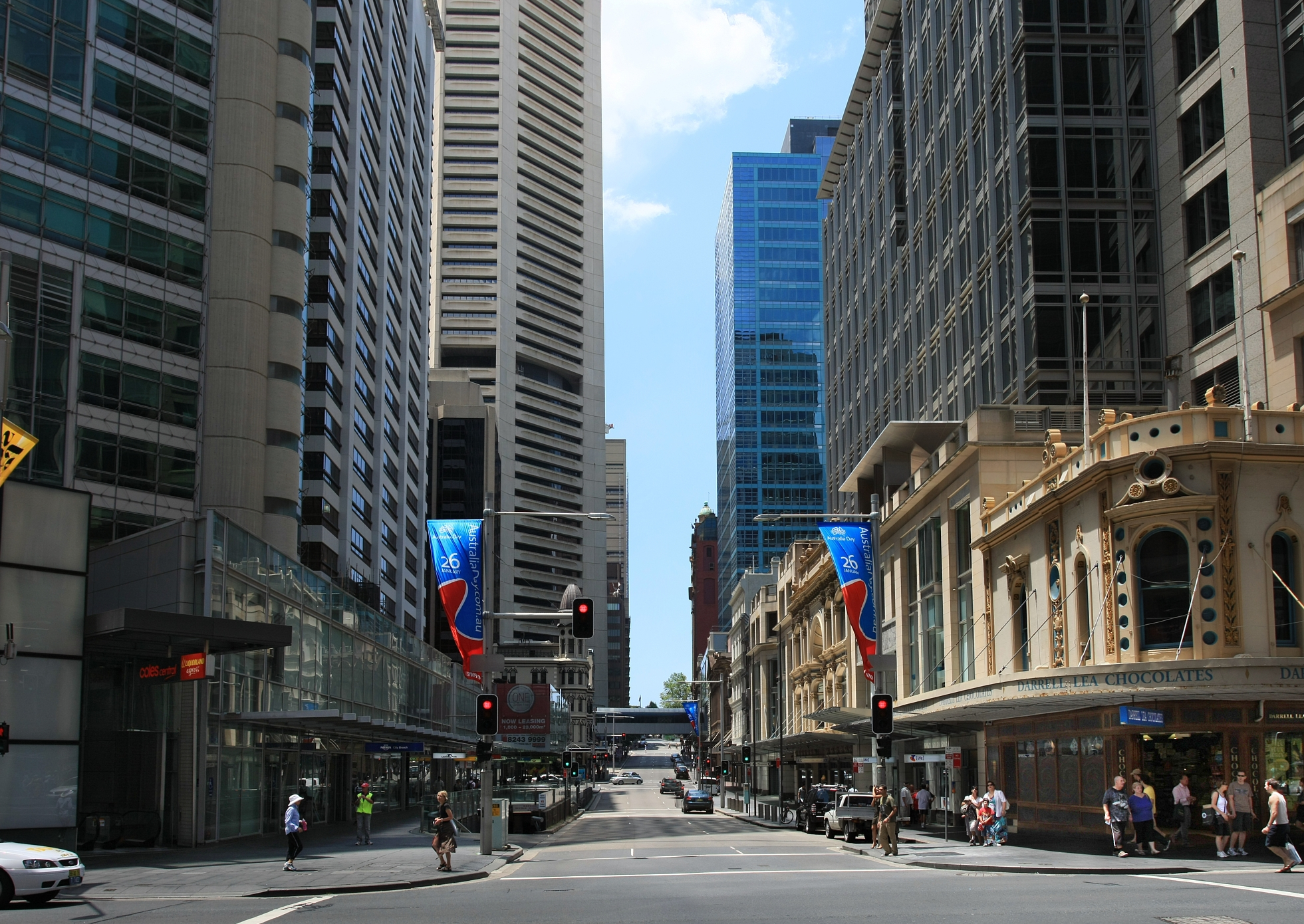
- A contemporary view of King Street, looking east from George Street
- Coordinates: 33.868734°S 151.202076°E (Western end); 33.869303°S 151.212044°E (Eastern end)

General information
- Type: Street
- Length: 900 m (0.6 mi)

Major junctions
- Western end: Lime Street; Sydney CBD
- Shelley Street; Sussex Street; Kent Street; Clarence Street; York Street; George Street; Pitt Street; Castlereagh Street; Elizabeth Street; Phillip Street
- Eastern end: Macquarie Street; Sydney CBD

Location(s)
- LGA(s): City of Sydney
- Major suburbs: Sydney CBD

King Street is a street in the Sydney central business district in New South Wales, Australia. It stretches from King Street Wharf and Lime Street near Darling Harbour in the west, to Queens Square at St James railway station in the east.

== History and description ==
King Street was named after Governor Phillip Gidley King, the third Governor of New South Wales.

The Watsons Bay tramway ran down King Street until its closure and replacement by buses in 1960.

King Street provides the northern border of Pitt Street Mall. 25 Martin Place is a skyscraper that sits on the corner of Castlereagh Street. Other prominent buildings along King Street include the Supreme Court of New South Wales, St James Church and St James campus of the Sydney Law School.

== King Street cycleway ==
In May 2009, 200m stretch of cycleway along King Street in the CBD was opened.

In January 2023, Transport for NSW proposed to "provide the missing link of the King Street Cycleway". Business Sydney claimed in April 2025 the new lane along King St risked plunging the city into "even greater gridlock".

Several design options were compared for the project. The option was chosen which required "road widening and footpath adjustments" (footpath removal) to create space for the new cycleway.

Transport for NSW stated a benefit of the selected design option is that it does not require reallocating a general traffic lane for active transport usage, which "would have the potential to increase traffic congestion within the Sydney CBD, including queuing onto the Western Distributor off-ramps."

The delay in construction of the "final missing link in the City’s cycleway network" at King Street was due to concerns about “possible” queuing on the Western Distributor. The 2024 TfNSW Review of Environmental Factors (EIS) for the cycleway claimed some options "would require a reduction in traffic lanes on King Street (from three lanes to two lanes) which could potentially impact traffic using the Western Distributor and Rozelle Interchange". During the Rozelle Interchange Parliamentary Inquiry, the City of Sydney "contended" that the planned upgrades "demonstrates Transport for NSW's continued prioritisation of road transportation ahead of active transport options". The Rozelle Interchange is approximately 3 kilometres away, cost approximately $3.9 billion and is one of the largest underground junctions in the world.

As of March 2026, construction is underway on the missing segment of the King Street cycleway. In March 2026 Transport for NSW changed the planned sequence of construction. The opening will take place later in 2026.

== See also ==
- Geography of Sydney
