= Balmain East ferry wharf =

Ferry wharf in Sydney, Australia

Balmain East
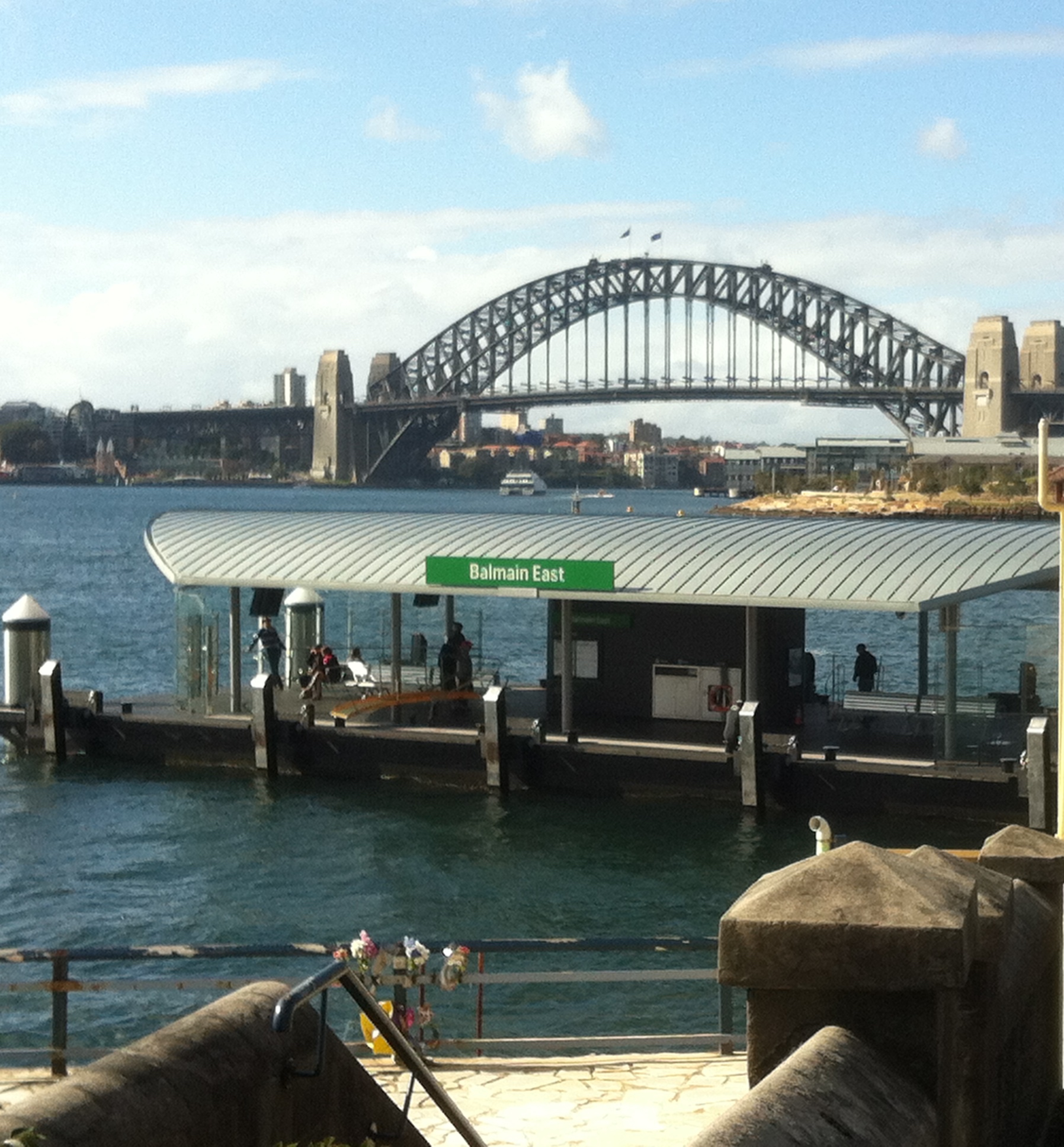
- Wharf in July 2015

General information
- Location: Darling Street, Balmain East; New South Wales; Australia
- Coordinates: 33°51′25″S 151°11′45″E
- Owner: Transport for NSW
- Operator: Transdev Sydney Ferries
- Platforms: 1 wharf (2 berths)
- Connections: Bus

Construction
- Accessible: Yes

Other information
- Status: Unstaffed

History
- Opened: 1840s
- Rebuilt: 18 June 2015
- Former names: Darling Street

Services
Preceding wharf	Sydney Ferries	Following wharf
Barangaroo towards Circular Quay	F3 Parramatta Limited services	Balmain towards Parramatta
McMahons Point towards Circular Quay	F4 Pyrmont Bay	Barangaroo towards Pyrmont Bay
Location

Balmain East ferry wharf is located on Sydney Harbour in the Sydney suburb of Balmain East. It is served by Sydney Ferries Pyrmont Bay services operating between Circular Quay and Pyrmont Bay.

== History ==
The Balmain East ferry wharf has been operating since the 1840s as Balmain's main wharf. Originally, watermen offered the first services on demand in small rowing skiffs or sailing dinghies. In February 1844 the steamer Waterman commenced the first public ferry service between Balmain and the Australian Gas Light Company wharf at Millers Point. The service was established by Perdriau Ferries that later Balmain Steam Ferries.

From the beginning of the 20th century, Sydney's electric tram system down Darling Street to the wharf and connected with the ferries. The tramway operated until 1954. As the road next to the wharf had a grade of 1 in 8, a unique counterweight dummy system was installed under the road surface to help push trams up the hill. An underground counterweight system was connected by cable to a cable tram grip dummy on the track on the surface. A tram descending would push the grip dummy ahead of it (which raised the counterweight). On the return journey, the grip dummy would give the tram a helpful push. The mechanism was preserved at the Sydney Tramway Museum when the tramway was removed.

In 1996 the wharf was renamed from Darling Street to Balmain East.

On 14 January 2015, the wharf closed for a rebuild with the existing structure demolished and a new one opened on 18 June 2015.

== Services ==
Balmain East wharf is served by Sydney Ferries Pyrmont Bay services operating between Circular Quay and Pyrmont Bay. It is also served by weekday and weekend evening Parramatta River services services from Sydney Olympic Park.

Platform	Line	Stopping pattern	Notes
1	Parramatta River ferry service	Services to Circular Quay (Late night only)	
1	Pyrmont Bay ferry service	Services to Circular Quay & Pyrmont Bay	

== Transport links ==
Transit Systems operates one bus route to and from Balmain East wharf:

- 442: to Queen Victoria Building
