= Lime Street, Sydney =

Street in Sydney, Australia

Lime Street, Sydney New South Wales
- Sydney, Australia
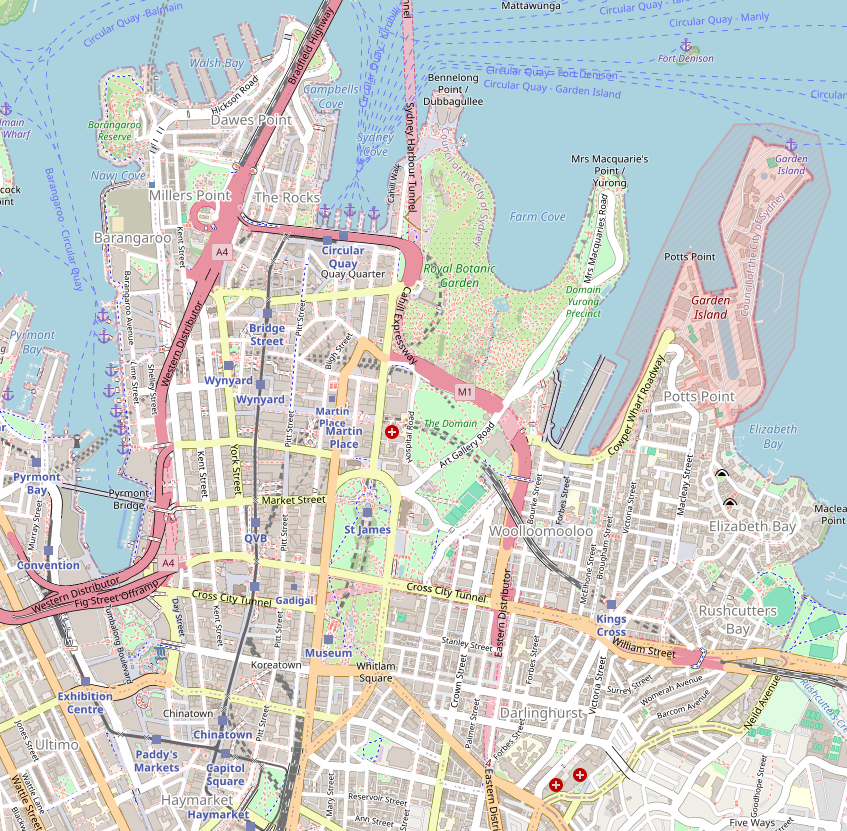
- Coordinates: 33°51′58″S 151°12′06″E (Northern end); 33°52′07″S 151°12′07″E (Southern end)

General information
- Type: Street
- Length: 350 m (1,100 ft)

Major junctions
- Northern end: Barangaroo Avenue; Barangaroo, Sydney
- Shelley Street; Erskine Street
- Southern end: King Street; Sydney CBD

Location(s)
- LGA(s): City of Sydney
- Major suburbs: Sydney CBD

Lime Street is a street in the central business district of Sydney in New South Wales, Australia. It stretches from King Street near Darling Harbour in the south and extends slightly north of the end of Erskine Street.

It is in a former maritime industrial area on the eastern shore of Darling Harbour which is undergoing an extensive redevelopment.

Lime Street is an eastern boundary of the commercial waterfront development of the King Street Wharf.
