= Darling Street =

Street in Sydney, New South Wales,Australia

Darling Street New South Wales

General information
- Type: Street
- Length: 3.1 km (1.9 mi)

Major junctions
- West end: Victoria Road
- East end: Balmain East ferry wharf

Location(s)
- Suburb(s): Rozelle, Balmain

Darling Street is a 3.1-kilometre-long street in Sydney, New South Wales, Australia running from Victoria Road to Balmain East ferry wharf. It is the main thoroughfare and high street of the suburbs of Rozelle and Balmain, and a noted café and restaurant strip.

Balmain Market is on the corner of Darling and Curtis Road.

== History ==
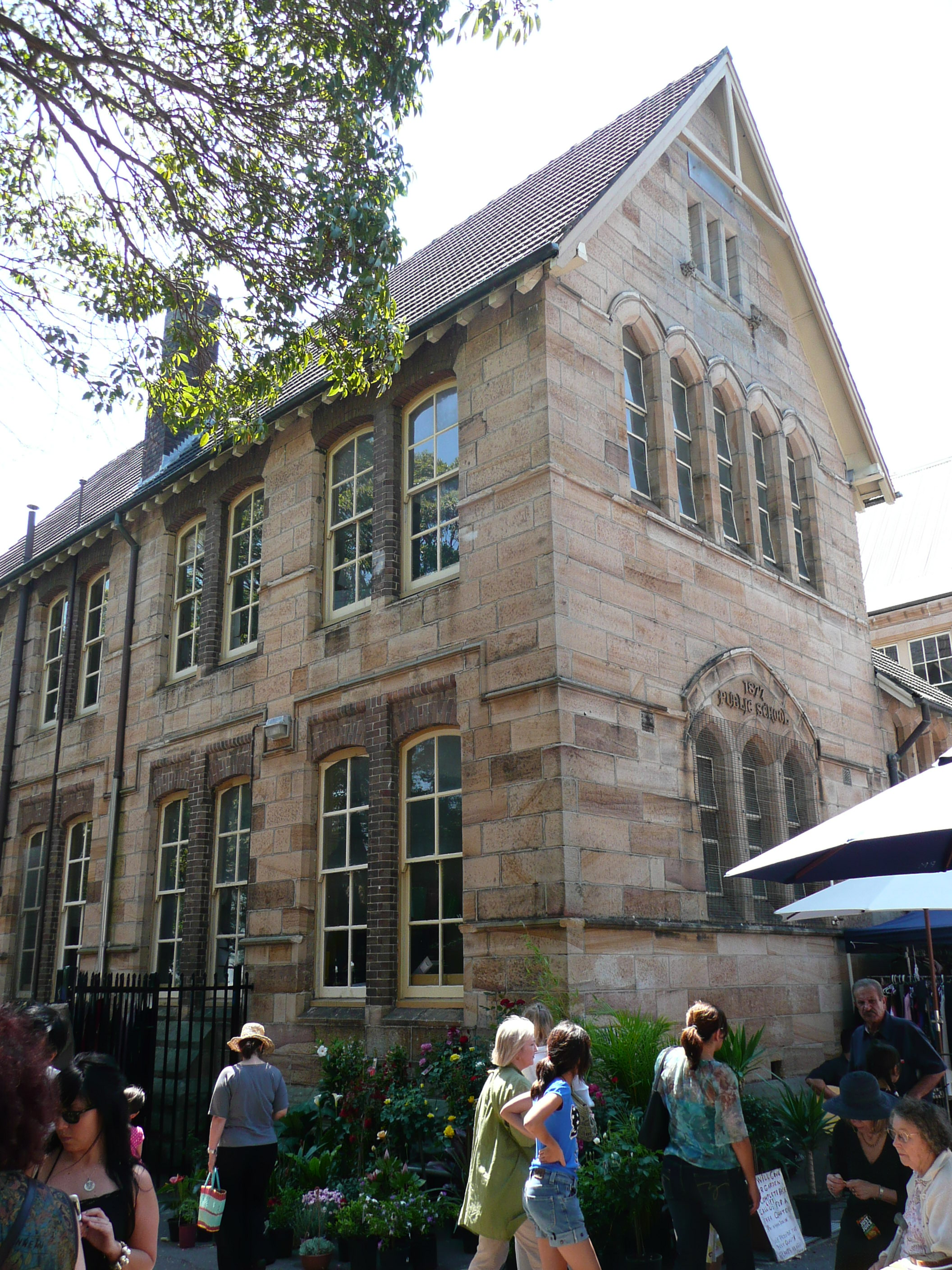
Rozelle Public School, designed by John Horbury Hunt

Darling Street was named after General Sir Ralph Darling, a British Army officer who served as Governor of New South Wales from 1825 to 1831.

In 1875, Darling Street received its first installation of gas lighting. The effect of this was so that during the late 1880s there was an increase of business due to the increase of illumination along the shopping strip at night. Twenty years prior to this the area where the town hall is now located was occupied by bushland.

== Trams ==
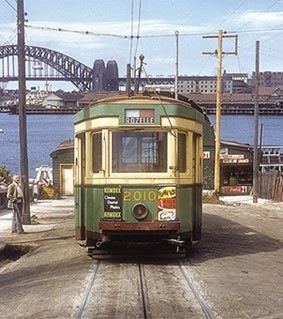
Tram 2010 at the Darling Street wharf

Trams once ran all the way down Darling Street to Balmain East wharf. The first steam tram to service Darling Street was in 1892. Ten years later the service was electrified. A feature of this line was a counterweight dummy system that controlled and assisted trams on a steep single-line section of track near the terminus at Darling Wharf. Due to the very steep (1 in 8) descent at the eastern end of the street beyond Nicholson Street, the trams used a complex counterweight system constructed under the road surface. The trams were pushed up the steep hill by the dummy, and rode the dummy on the way down to safely descend the hill.

== Gladstone Park Reservoir ==
Construction of the Gladstone Park Reservoir was announced in 1912 causing public outcry. The water board reassured residents that the park and bandstand would be restored to its former status once the reservoir was complete. Before construction of the reservoir residents obtained their water supply from backyard wells or water carts. Completed in 1917 the reservoir is still intact and the water is now used for reserve supply only.
