= Pyrmont Bay ferry service =

Commuter ferry service in Sydney, Australia

F4 Pyrmont Bay

- MV Pemulwuy at Milsons Point in November 2017
- Waterway: Sydney Harbour; Lavender Bay; Darling Harbour
- Owner: Sydney Ferries
- Operator: Transdev Sydney Ferries
- Began operation: 1980s (Darling Harbour ferry); 25 October 2020 (F4 Pyrmont Bay ferry)
- System length: 6 wharves, 4.0km (Circular Quay to Barangaroo)
- No. of vessels: Emerald class; First Fleet class
- No. of terminals: 2

The Pyrmont Bay ferry service, officially known as F4 Pyrmont Bay, is a commuter ferry service in Sydney, New South Wales, Australia. Part of the Sydney Ferries network, it is operated by Transdev Sydney Ferries and services the Lavender Bay and Darling Harbour areas. It began operation on 25 October 2020, and replaced the western half of the F4 Cross Harbour ferry service. Emerald-class and First Fleet-class ferries operate the service.

The F4 Pyrmont Bay follows the same stopping pattern as the ceased Darling Harbour ferry service, officially known as F4 Darling Harbour. The Darling Harbour service was operated by the State Transit Authority from its commencement in the 1980s, the Sydney Ferries Corporation from 2004, and Harbour City Ferries from 2013 until the service was replaced by the F4 Cross Harbour service on 26 November 2017. It was originally created to promote tourist and traveller pilgrimage to the Darling Harbour precinct after its redevelopment in the 1980s. First Fleet and HarbourCat ferries usually operated the service. King Street Wharf served as the route's terminus during the majority of its later lifespan before it was replaced by Barangaroo.

== History ==
Animation depicting Darling Harbour ferry services from the 1992 Sydney Ferries timetable onwards

After the redevelopment of the Darling Harbour precinct in the 1980s until the late 1990s, the area was serviced by public transport with only one wharf, the Aquarium ferry wharf; adjacent to the Sydney Aquarium. (Note: A Sydney Ferries map from 1992 shows Aquarium as the only stop in the Darling Harbour precinct.) The wharf was opened as part of an initiative to promote pilgrimage to the new Darling Harbour precinct and its new attractions, such as the Aquarium. It also coincided with the opening of the Sydney Monorail loop from Town Hall to Darling Harbour. Routes from Circular Quay to Aquarium and vice versa usually included stops at Darling Street Balmain / Balmain East and McMahons Point. (Note: Sydney Ferries maps from 1992 and 1995 showed Darling Harbour services, coloured purple, stopping at McMahons Point, Balmain West (Darling Street Balmain) and terminating at Aquarium.) Following the opening of the Milsons Point and Pyrmont Bay wharves in the late 90s, Darling Harbour ferries also included these stops, with Pyrmont Bay being the terminus of the route. Balmain was also included on the route after timetable changes in April 2002, as a stop between Balmain East and Aquarium. (Note: An April 2002 Sydney Ferries map shows Milsons Point, Balmain and Pyrmont Bay included on the route, with Pyrmont Bay being the new terminus of the service. Maps based on September 2006 timetables show that this stopping pattern was kept.) After July 2008 timetable changes, the route was briefly split into two terminuses, with Balmain East serving as a junction between a route to Balmain and a Route to Pyrmont Bay. (Note: A July 2008 Sydney Ferries map shows the route being split into two, with Balmain and Pyrmont Bay as terminuses and Balmain East as a junction between the two.)

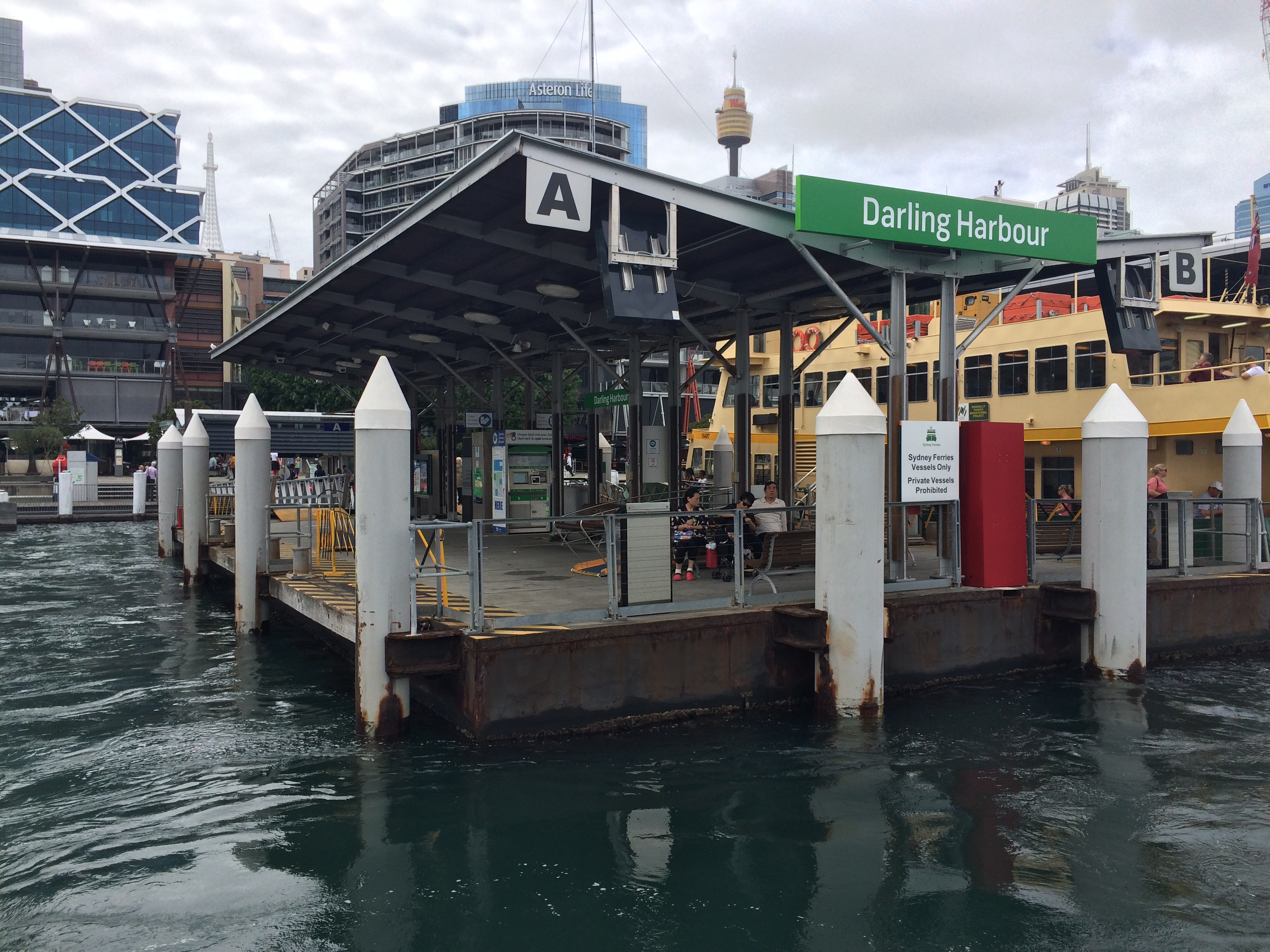
Darling Harbour wharf, the former terminus of the F4 Darling Harbour service from 2010 to June 2017.

After a publicised fatal collision of the Sydney Ferries HarbourCat Pam Burridge and the private vessel Merinda in March 2007, resulting in the death of four people and injury of two others, a report on the Sydney Ferries Corporation, the previous operator of the Sydney Ferries system, conducted and written by Bret Walker, was commissioned and released in November 2007. One of the many recommendations of the "Walker Report" was to create a new ferry terminal at Darling Harbour, to ease congestion on the network, especially at Circular Quay. (Note: (Chapter Three, Page 55) "One partial solution to the congestion at Circular Quay is for SFC to develop an additional CBD hub at King Street wharf... SFC currently has exclusive use of King Street No 3 wharf.") The plan for the Darling Harbour service was to decommission the Aquarium wharf, leaving it for use by commercial vessels, and rerouting services from Aquarium to Darling Harbour wharf, which was already in use as a stop on the Parramatta River service. This would create a new interchange between Parramatta River and Darling Harbour services; a terminal in which was created with the December 2011 timetable change, though, Pyrmont Bay still served as the terminus of the service until the October 2013 timetable change. (Note: A December 2011 Sydney Ferries map shows that the King Street Wharf was included on the Darling Harbour route. It became the terminus with the 2013 timetable, represented in the 2013 Sydney Ferries map.)

In May 2013, it was announced by Transport for NSW that a new terminal servicing the redeveloped Barangaroo precinct will be built to replace the King Street Wharf terminal. The new wharf at Barangaroo was to be located a few meters north of the King Street Wharf; construction commenced in 2015/16 and opened in June 2017. Darling Harbour wharf was then decommissioned by Sydney Ferries for use for tourist and commercial purposes after the new wharf's opening. Both Darling Harbour and Parramatta River services were rerouted from the Darling Harbour to Barangaroo.

The Darling Harbour service was replaced by the F4 Cross Harbour ferry services on 26 November 2017. Following community consultation jointly held by the ferry operator Transdev Sydney Ferries and Transport for NSW in 2019–2020, the F4 Cross Harbour route was divided into F4 Pyrmont Bay and F9 Watsons Bay services on 25 October 2020. During the consultation, the new F4 was originally planned to be known as the F4 City Connector. The F4 Pyrmont Bay service follows the same stopping pattern as the Darling Harbour service.

== Service ==
=== Present ===
Name	Distance from Circular Quay	Waterway	Serving suburbs	Other lines	Photo of wharf
Pyrmont Bay – Circular Quay
Pyrmont Bay	4.5 km	Darling Harbour	Pyrmont	none	
Barangaroo	3.9 km	Darling Harbour	Barangaroo, Sydney CBD	Parramatta River ferry service	
Balmain East	3.0 km	Darling Harbour	Balmain East	(late night only)	
McMahons Point	1.7 km	Lavender Bay	McMahons Point	(peak only)	
Milsons Point	1.3 km	Lavender Bay	Milsons Point	(peak only)	
Circular Quay	0.0 km	Sydney Cove	Sydney CBD, The Rocks	Manly ferry service Taronga Zoo ferry service Parramatta River ferry service Neutral Bay ferry service Mosman Bay ferry service Double Bay ferry service Cockatoo Island ferry service Watsons Bay ferry service	

=== 2013–2017 ===
The Darling Harbour service was officially known as the F4 Darling Harbour service since 2013, under the new Transport for NSW design and operation architecture. It was one of seven distinct routes on the Sydney Ferries network between 2013 and 2017.

When created in the 1980s, the route first consisted of stops at McMahons Point, Balmain East and Sydney Aquarium. Additional stops at Milsons Point, Balmain and Pyrmont were included on the route in the early 2000s, however, Balmain was later removed from the route and an inquiry into Sydney Ferries in 2007 advised the creation of a new terminal at Darling Harbour be built, which would become Barangaroo.

Ferries travelling towards Barangaroo from Circular Quay departed from Wharf 5. It typically took 23 minutes to travel from Circular Quay to Darling Harbour, where the service terminated. There was a short interval between arrival and departure of ferries from Barangaroo travelling towards Circular Quay, lasting 3 minutes off-peak and 7 minutes on-peak. The Pyrmont Bay wharf could only be accessed on the Darling Harbour to Circular Quay service. Ferries travelling towards Darling Harbour did not stop at Pyrmont Bay. A trip from Darling Harbour towards Circular Quay usually lasted 27 minutes.

In 2015, both Balmain East and Pyrmont Bay were closed for reconstruction and upgrades. Balmain East was officially closed for upgrade on 14 January 2015, with the upgrade completed by May 2015. Pyrmont Bay was closed in April 2015 . The Casino wharf nearby was used to temporarily replace Pyrmont Bay during the upgrade.

== Fleet ==
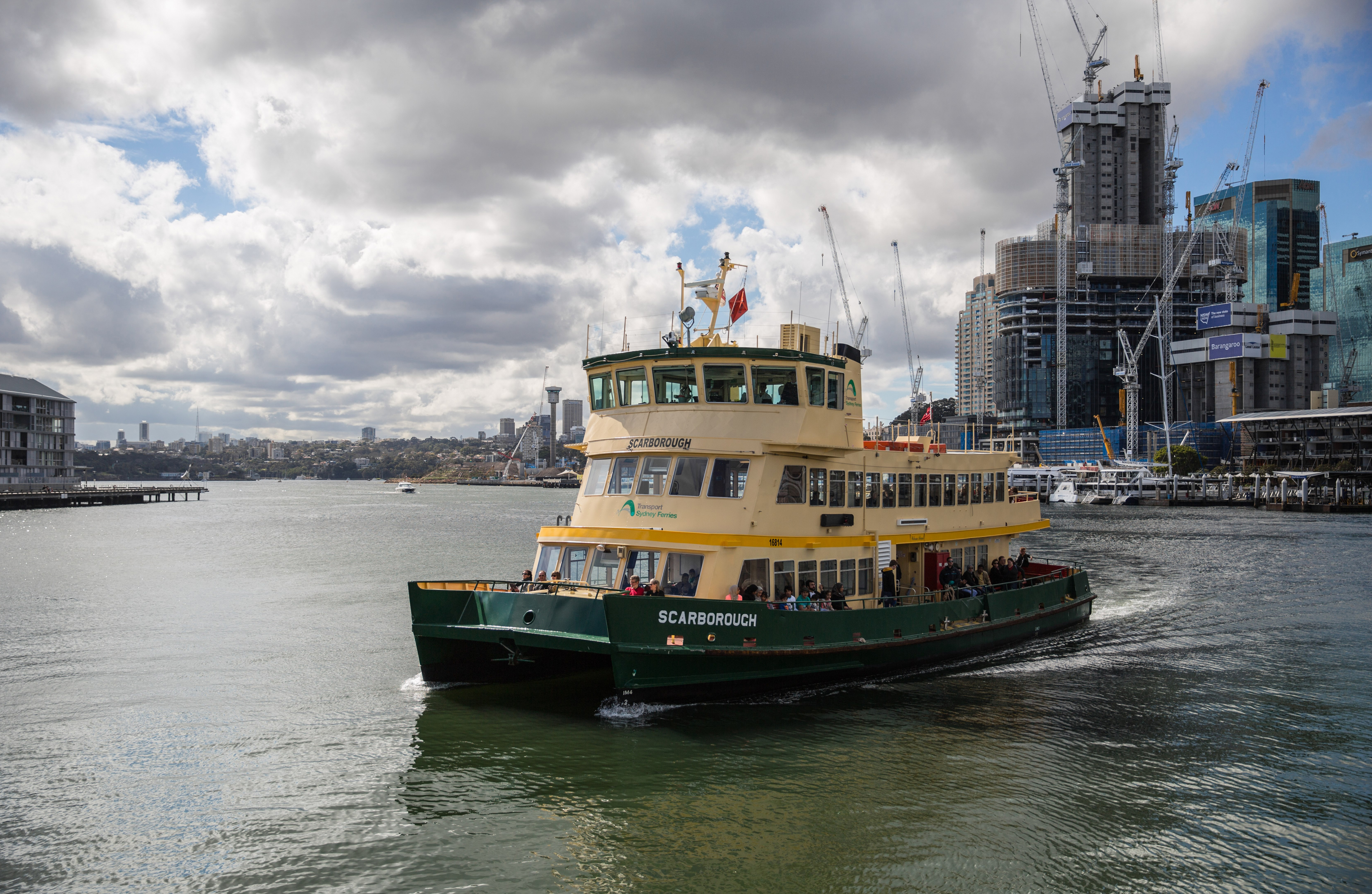
Scarborough pulling into Pyrmont Bay in August 2014

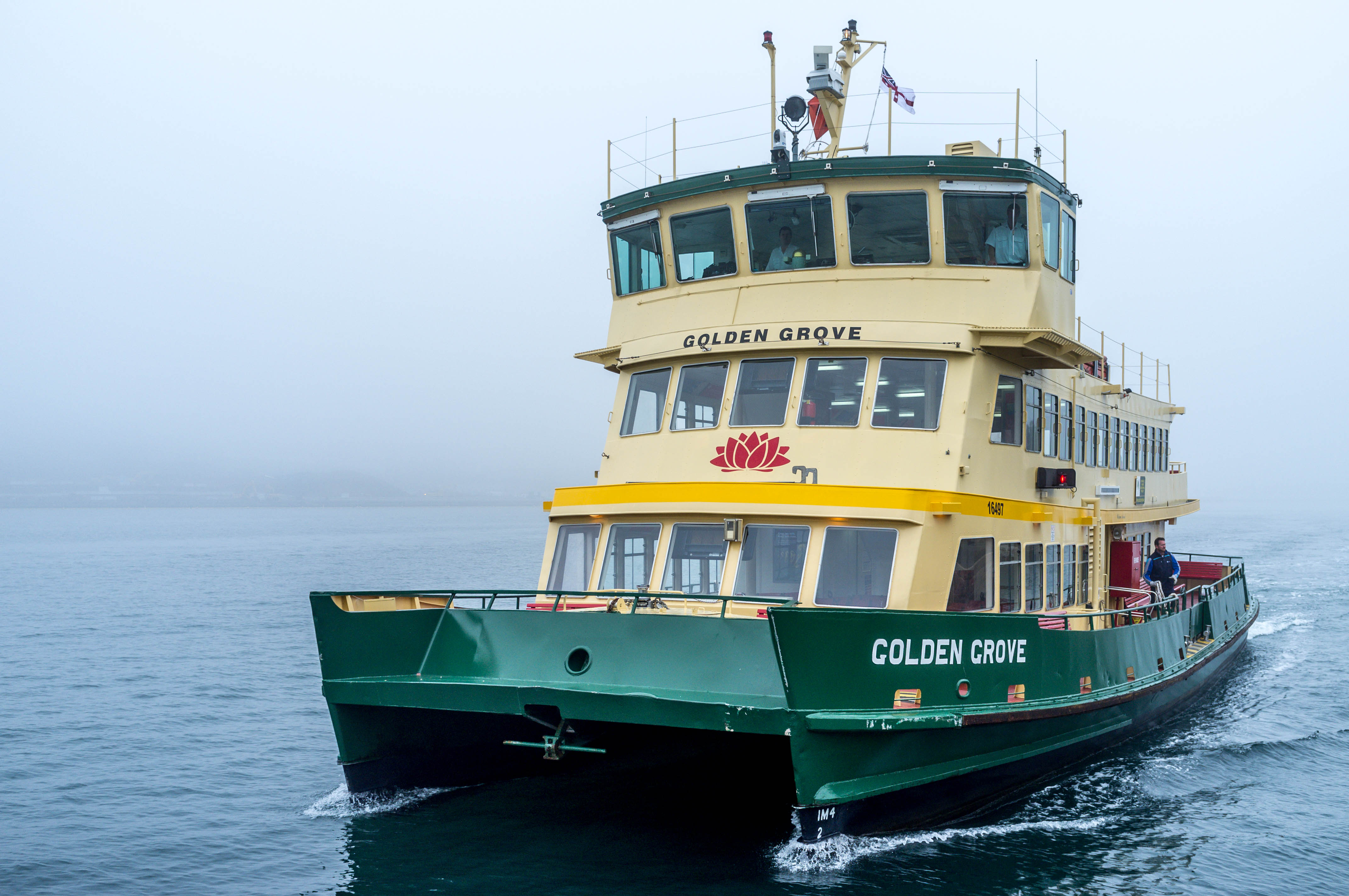
Golden Grove

The fleet of ferries that ran the Darling Harbour service were of the First Fleet class; ferries commissioned and entered into service in 1984 to 86. The First Fleet ferries are a series of compact, catamaran double decker vessels, which include a third deck for crew, designed to carry up to 396 passengers. At the cessation of F4 Darling Harbour in 2017, there were nine First Fleet class ferries that operate on the Sydney Ferries network. Emerald-class ferries are the usual ferries on this route.

== Patronage ==
The following table shows the patronage of Sydney Ferries network for the year 2025.

2025-26 Sydney Ferries annual patronage by line (Note: Figures based on Opal tap on and tap off data)
Manly ferry service	4,532,938	View source data.
Taronga Zoo ferry service	1,545,805	View source data.
Parramatta River ferry service	2,429,310	View source data.
Pyrmont Bay ferry service	2,779,319	View source data.
Neutral Bay ferry service	562,998	View source data.
Mosman Bay ferry service	709,762	View source data.
Double Bay ferry service	273,741	View source data.
Cockatoo Island ferry service	535,934	View source data.
Watsons Bay ferry service	1,873,854	View source data.
Blackwattle Bay ferry service	17,970	
