= Milsons Point ferry wharf =

Ferry wharf in Sydney, Australia

Milsons Point
- Northern entrance to the wharf in November 2017

General information
- Location: Olympic Drive, Milsons Point; New South Wales; Australia
- Coordinates: 33°50′58″S 151°12′38″E
- Owner: Transport for NSW
- Operator: Transdev Sydney Ferries
- Platforms: 2
- Connections: Buses

Construction
- Accessible: Yes

Other information
- Status: Unstaffed

History
- Rebuilt: 29 November 2010; 26 November 2017

Services
Preceding wharf	Sydney Ferries	Following wharf
Circular Quay Terminus	F3 Parramatta peak hour only	McMahons Point towards Parramatta
Circular Quay Terminus	F4 Pyrmont Bay	McMahons Point towards Pyrmont Bay
Location

Milsons Point ferry wharf is located on the northern side of Sydney Harbour in the suburb of Milsons Point. It is next to Luna Park and the Sydney Harbour Bridge. It is served by Sydney Ferries Parramatta River and Pyrmont Bay services.

== History ==
On 24 May 2010, the wharf closed for a six-month rebuild. The existing wharf was demolished with a new one built by Hansen Yuncken. A project to construct a second wharf commenced in April 2017 with services diverted to Jeffrey Street.

== Services ==
Platform	Line	Stopping pattern	Notes
1	Parramatta River ferry service	Morning services to Circular Quay; Evening services to Parramatta	
1	Pyrmont Bay ferry service	Services to Circular Quay & Pyrmont Bay	

== Transport links ==
Busways operates four bus routes to and from Milsons Point wharf:

- 203: to Castlecrag
- 209: to East Lindfield
- 286: to Denistone East
- 287: to Ryde Bus Depot

Keolis Northern Beaches operates three bus routes to and from Milsons Point wharf:

- 150X: to Manly wharf
- 154X: to Dee Why
- 230: to Mosman Bay wharf
