= King Street Wharf =

Wharf in Sydney, New South Wales, Australia

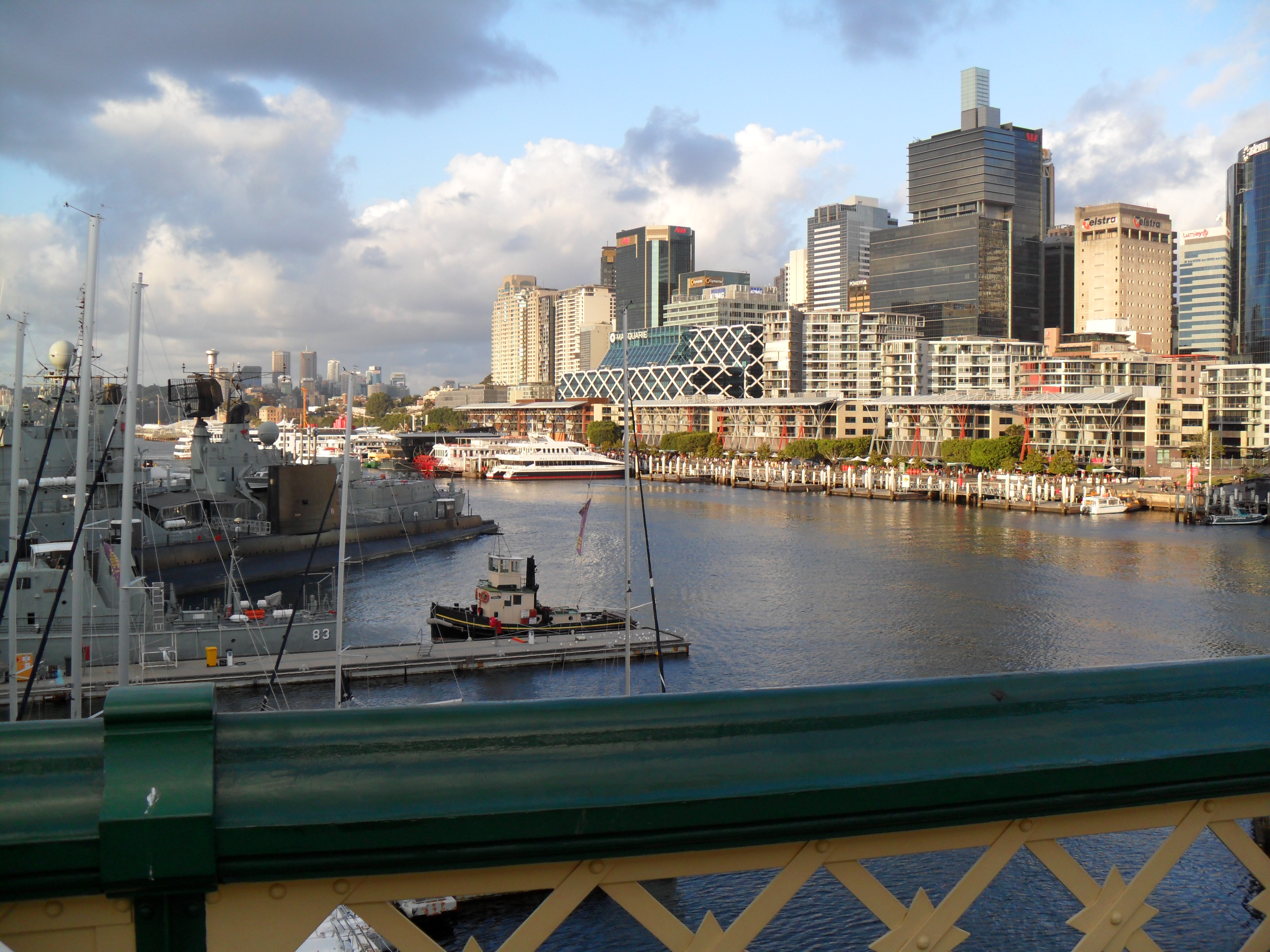
- View from Pyrmont Bridge in December 2011

General information
- Location: Lime Street, Sydney; New South Wales; Australia
- Coordinates: 33°52′03″S 151°12′06″E
- Owner: Transport for NSW
- Operator: Captain Cook Cruises (Wharf 1 and 2)
- Platforms: 9 wharves (14 berths)

Construction
- Accessible: Yes

History
- Opened: circa 2000
Location

King Street Wharf is a mixed-use tourism, commercial, residential, retail and maritime development on the eastern shore of Darling Harbour, an inlet of Sydney Harbour, New South Wales, Australia. Located on the western side of the city's central business district, the complex served as a maritime industrial area in the early and mid 20th century. It was redeveloped as part of extensive urban renewal projects around Sydney Harbour in the 1980s and 90s. The complex is host to a cluster of nine wharves, with the first two wharves currently in use by private ferry operator Captain Cook Cruises and a third decommissioned by Sydney Ferries.

== Description ==
King Street Wharf is adjacent to the Darling Harbour tourist precinct, and on the western edge of the Sydney central business district.

The residential towers occupy the area bounded by King Street to the south, Shelley Street to the east, Erskine Street to the north and Lime Street to the west, including:

- 155 residential apartments in the 14-story north tower
- 107 residential apartments in the 10-story south tower
- 95 residential apartments in the 8-story buildings at 45–49 Shelley Street

The commercial waterfront is between Lime Street and Darling Harbour, and extends slightly north of the end of Erskine Street. It consists of 85 commercial suites with a retail component set underneath. This retail area contains 11 restaurants, the largest of which seats 450 including its outdoor areas.

== Developments ==
Under Walker Corporation, the retail and restaurants, stages of residential and serviced apartments and commercial/retail strata suites were completed. The remainder of the development parcels are still being developed by Brookfield Multiplex. They include the completed KPMG headquarters, American Express House, Ibis Hotel, Macquarie Bank headquarters and One Shelley Street office building. The remaining development will consist of further commercial and retail and public parking expected to be completed over the next few years. It also involves associated infrastructure such as roadworks, car parking, charter vessel berthing facilities and coach parking.

== Wharves ==
=== Wharf 1 ===
Wharf 1 is currently used by Captain Cook Cruises as a stop on its Darling Harbour to Circular Quay service. The wharf is serviced by 22 daily services on weekdays, and 23 daily services on weekends and public holidays on looping stopping patterns originating from Harbour Master Steps ferry wharf and terminating at Circular Quay ferry wharf. An additional morning service on weekends originates from the Pier 26 ferry wharf.

=== Wharf 2 ===
Wharf 2 is currently used by Captain Cook Cruises as the terminus of its Darling Harbour to Manly shuttle service. Seventeen services to Manly Wharf depart from Wharf 2 daily on weekdays, with seven departures on weekends and public holidays.

=== Wharf 3 ===
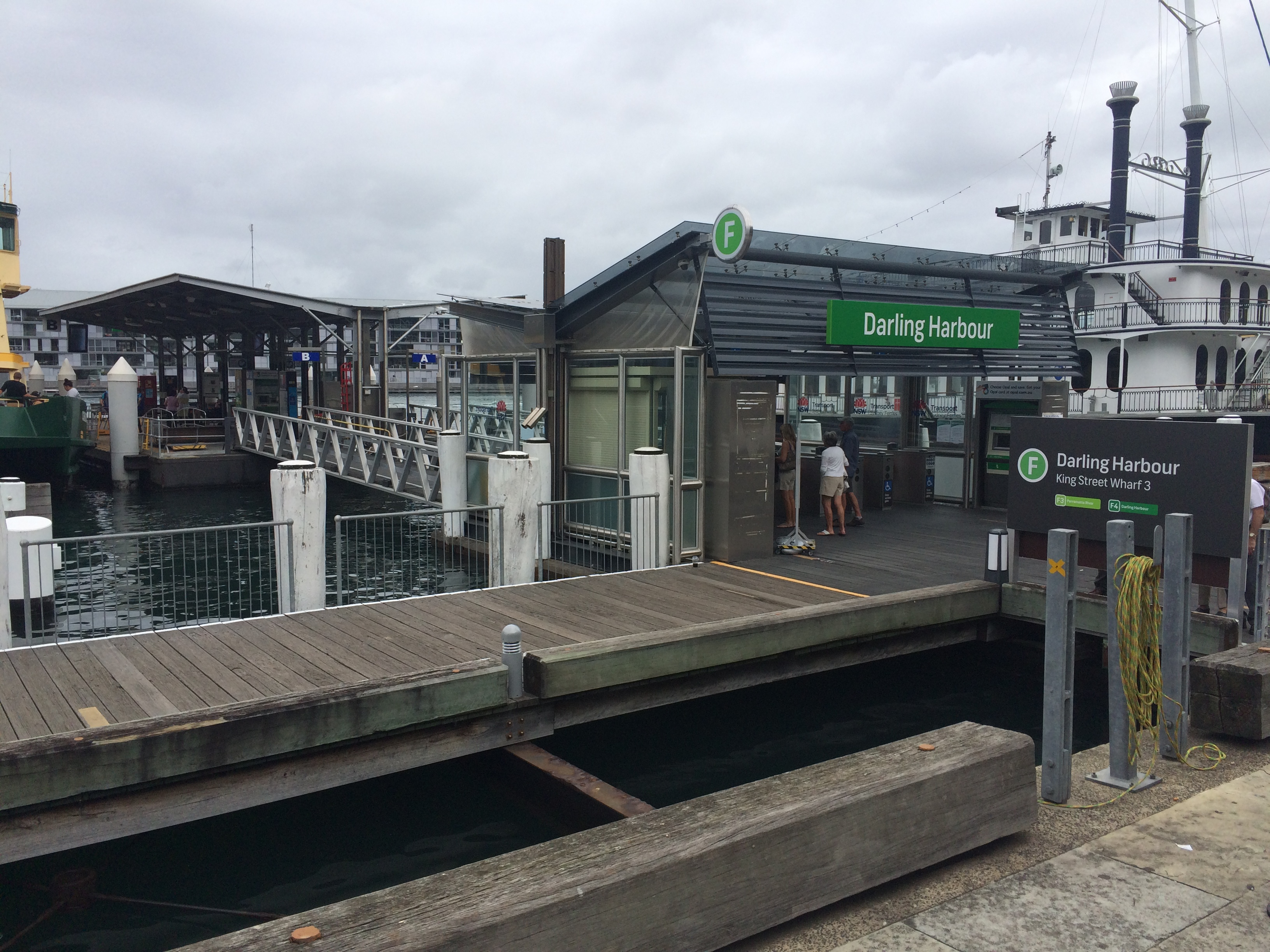
Entrance to King Street Wharf 3 during its time as a Sydney Ferries network stop in March 2015

Originally opened as one of the many privately operated wharves in the King Street Wharf development, Wharf 3 was selected as the recommended temporary site for a second major terminal on the Sydney Ferries network in the Walker Report, which also recommended that the King Street ferry wharf be upgraded and established as a Western city ferry hub to lessen ferry congestion at Circular Quay, with fare gates and ticketing machines introduced. These were implemented in October 2010.

It was used by Sydney Ferries First Fleet and RiverCat class ferries operating F3 Parramatta River and F4 Darling Harbour services from 2010 until 2017. On 26 June 2017, Sydney Ferries services ceased using the wharf with the opening of the nearby Barangaroo ferry wharf.
