= Pyrmont Bay ferry wharf =

Ferry wharf in Sydney, Australia

Pyrmont Bay
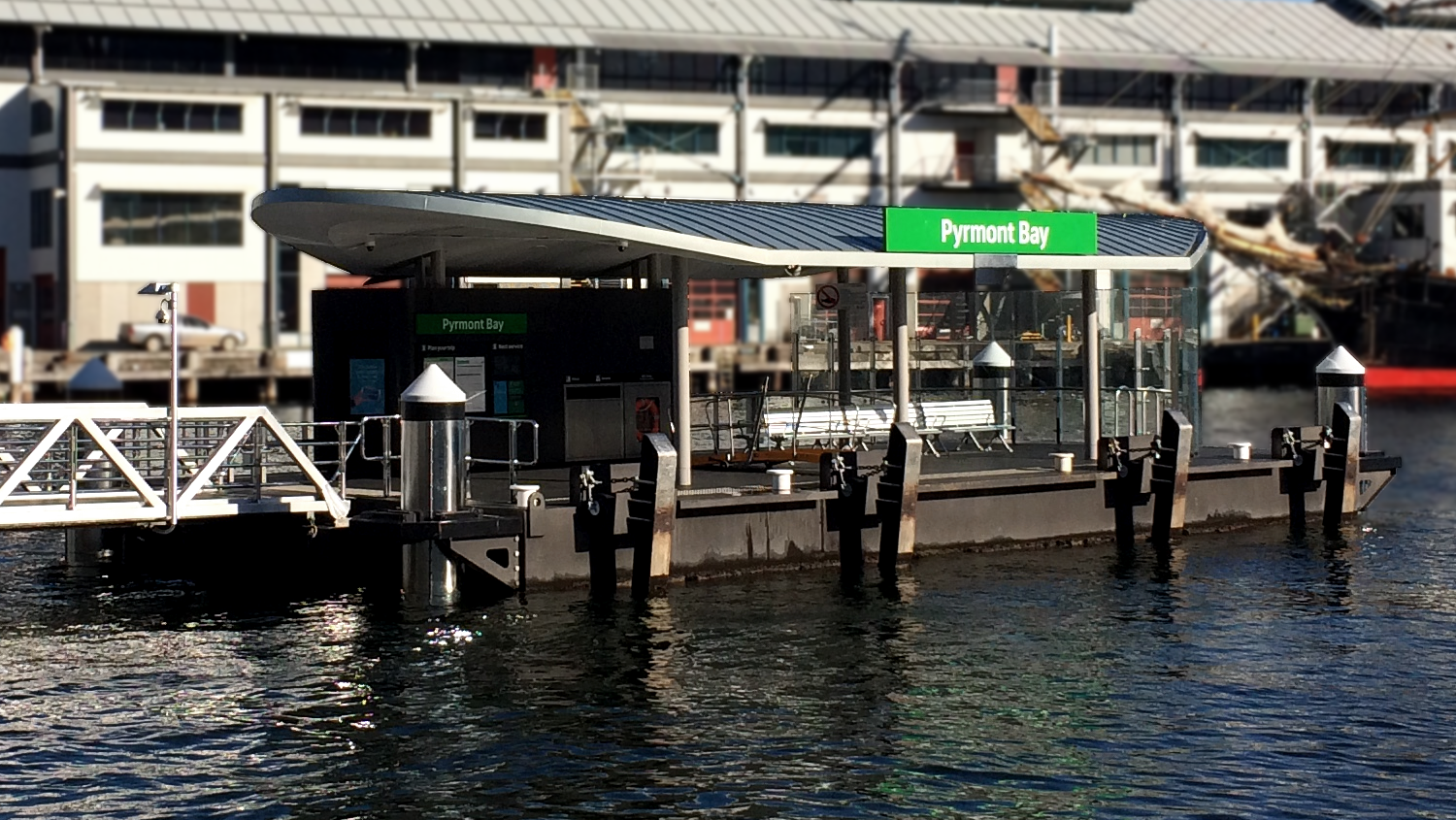
- View from Cape Bowling Green Light in March 2017

General information
- Location: Pirrama Road, Pyrmont; Australia
- Coordinates: 33°52′06″S 151°11′56″E
- Owner: Transport for NSW
- Operator: Transdev Sydney Ferries
- Platforms: 1
- Connections: Pyrmont Bay tram stop

Construction
- Accessible: Yes

Other information
- Status: Unstaffed

History
- Opened: 11 October 1996
Rebuilt
8 September 2015
Preceding wharf	Sydney Ferries	Following wharf
Barangaroo towards Circular Quay	F4 Pyrmont Bay	Terminus
Location

Pyrmont Bay ferry wharf is located on the western side of Darling Harbour serving the inner-city Sydney suburb of Pyrmont. It is located adjacent to the Australian National Maritime Museum and close to The Star Casino.

== History ==
The original Pyrmont Bay ferry wharf opened on 11 October 1996.

The wharf closed on 22 April 2015 for a four-month rebuild. During this time, both Sydney Ferries and Sydney Harbour Eco Hopper ferries called at Casino wharf instead.

== Services ==
Platform	Line	Stopping pattern	Notes
1	Pyrmont Bay ferry service	Services to Circular Quay	

== Transport links ==
=== Bus ===
Transdev John Holland operates one bus route from outside Pyrmont Bay light rail stop:

- 378: to Bronte

=== Light rail ===
One route operates from Pyrmont Bay light rail station:

- L1 Dulwich Hill Line: Central to Dulwich Hill
