= Neutral Bay Beach =

Beach in Sydney, Australia

Neutral Bay Beach Hayes Street Beach
- Beach
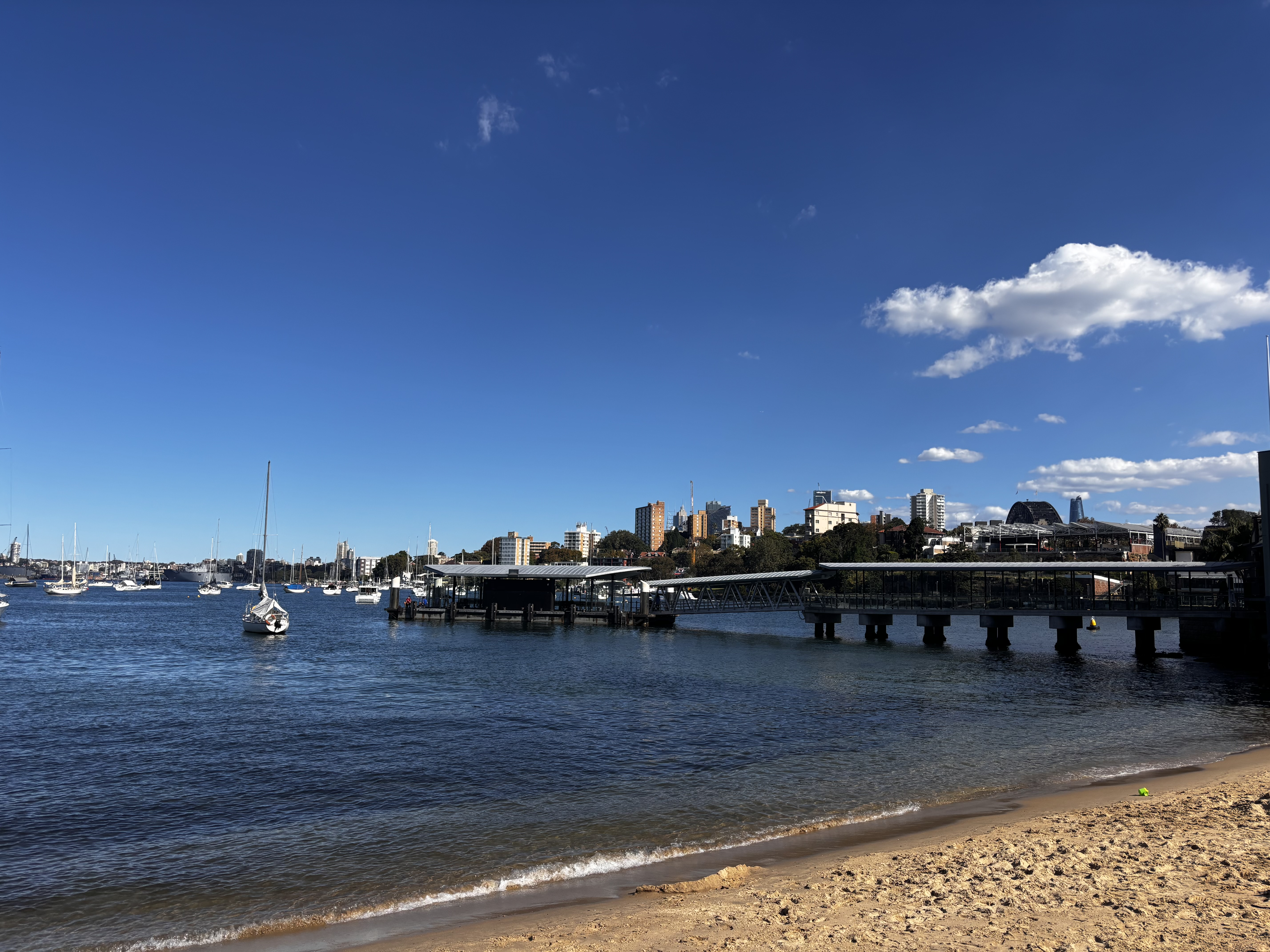
- A view of Neutral Bay Beach with Neutral Bay wharf
- Interactive map of Neutral Bay Beach
- Coordinates: 33.8416°S 151.2194°E
- Location: Hayes Street, Neutral Bay, New South Wales Australia
- Part of: Sydney Harbour, Australia
- Geology: Beach
- Operator: North Sydney Council

Dimensions
  - Length: 50m
- Patrolled by: None
- Hazard rating: N/A
- Access: Foot and boat

Neutral Bay Beach or Hayes Street Beach is the only beach in the suburb of Neutral Bay on the Lower North Shore in Sydney. It can be accessed from Hayes Street via a small laneway near the news agency. The beach itself is 50m long at low tide with a width of 10m. The beach is backed and surrounded by various apartment blocks and a small raised grassed area to the left.

The area is dog-friendly and allows off-leash play. The beach is also commonly used for sun-lounging, fishing and swimming.

== Pollution ==
Three storm water drains are located close to the beach and during rainy periods release much plastic pollution and chemical waste. It has been found that the drains often release pathogens associated with human waste. The public is advised to not use the beach during these periods.

== Facilities ==
The beach has a cold shower and waste bin at its exit and a small watercraft storage system to the left of the beach.
