= Kurraba Point =

- Suburb
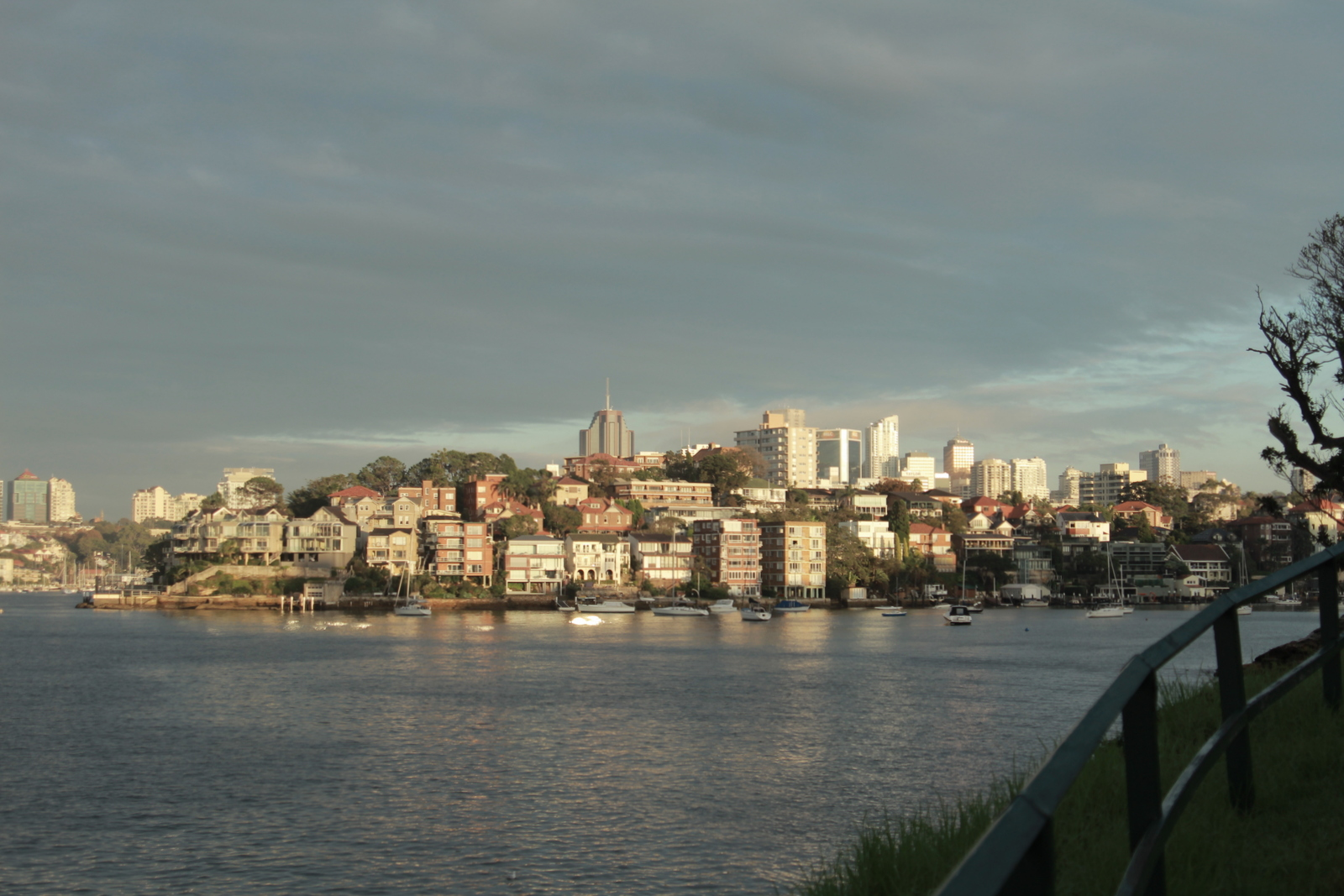
- Kurraba Point as seen from Cremorne

- Interactive map of Kurraba Point
- Country: Australia
- State: New South Wales
- City: Sydney
- LGA: North Sydney Council
- Location: 4 km (2.5 mi) north of Sydney CBD
- Established: 2010

Government
  - State electorate: North Shore
  - Federal division: Warringah

Area
  - Total: 0.3 km^{2} (0.12 sq mi)

Population
  - Total: 1,401 (2021 census)
  - Density: 4,700/km^{2} (12,100/sq mi)
- Postcode: 2089
Suburbs around Kurraba Point
North Sydney	Neutral Bay	Cremorne
Kirribilli	Kurraba Point	Cremorne Point
Milsons Point	(water)	(water)

Kurraba Point is a harbourside suburb on the lower North Shore of Sydney, New South Wales, Australia. Kurraba Point is located four kilometres north of the Sydney central business district, in the local government area of North Sydney Council.

Kurraba Point shares the postcode of 2089 with adjacent suburb of Neutral Bay. It is bordered by Neutral Bay, Cremorne and Cremorne Point.

== History ==
=== Aboriginal culture ===
Prior to the arrival of the First Fleet, the area in which Kurraba Point is situated was inhabited by the Cammeraygal Group of the Ku-ring-gai Aboriginal Tribe. The group, which inhabited the north shore of Port Jackson, was one of the largest in the Sydney area.

The name "Karraba" or "Kurraba" is of aboriginal derivation and is thought to mean Hungry Bay or Shell Cove.

=== European settlement ===
On 2 May 1814, Kurraba Point was included in the 700-acre land grant that was given to Lieutenant Alfred Thrupp as a wedding gift. At that time the area, which included most of what is now Neutral Bay and Kurraba Point, was called "Alfred Thrupp’s Farm" or "Thrupp's Acres". Sandstone was quarried from what is now Kurraba Point Reserve from around 1850 to supply stone for the construction of Fort Denison as well as ballast for ships returning to England and for local building. Through these times, the point was known as "Thrupps Point" and "Ballast Point".

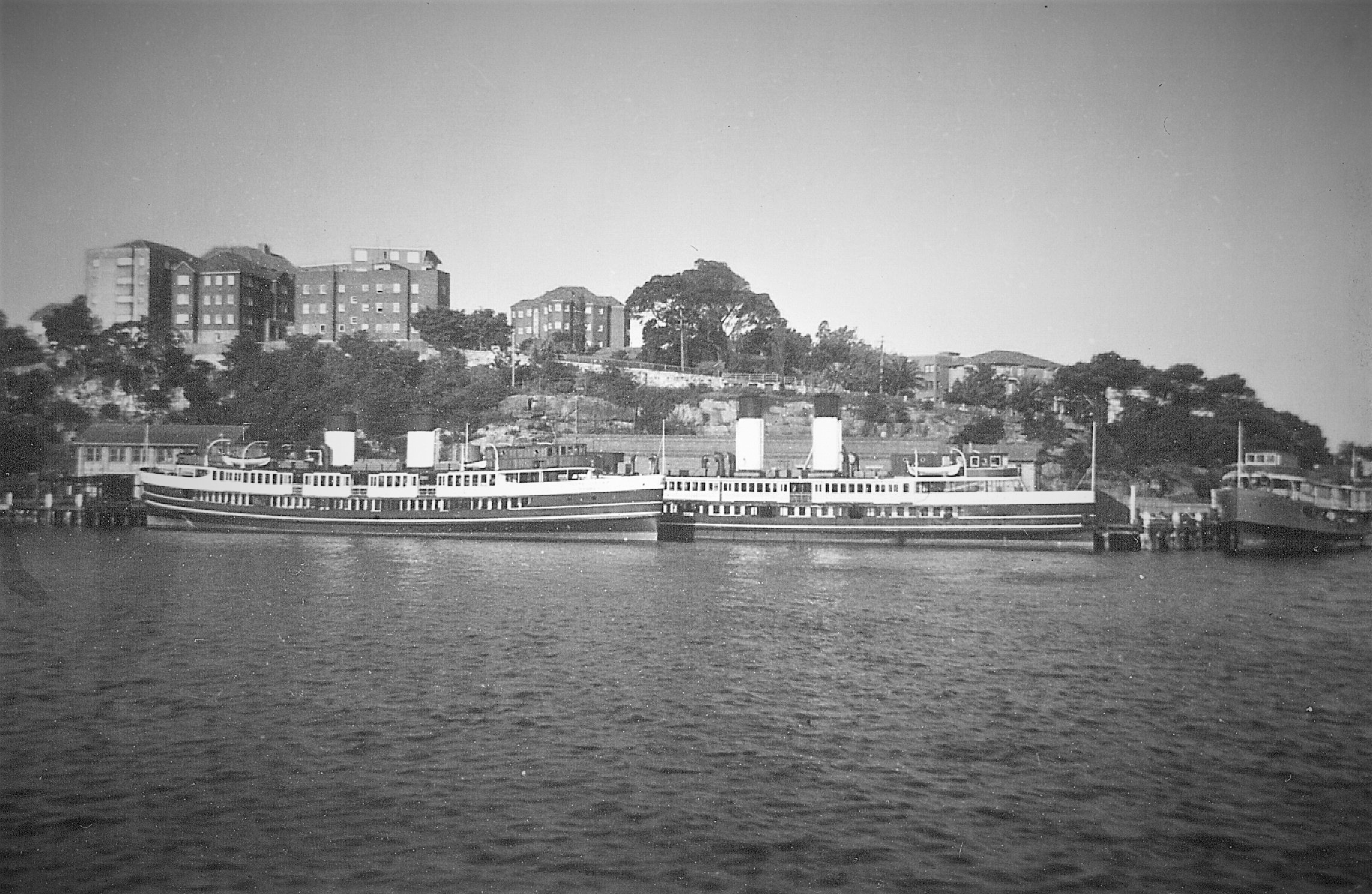
Manly ferries at the Port Jackson & Manly Steamship Company depot, 1950s

Patrick Hayes acquired a parcel of this land, where he established a soap and oil factory. The Port Jackson & Manly Steamship Company purchased Hayes’ former oil factory in 1883 and they set up a depot and engineering works there. In 1936 there was a fire at that depot when the ferry Bellubera caught fire and two men were killed. The Kurraba Point workshops were closed by the end of 1964; the State Government purchased the Kurraba Point site and in 1974 the site was cleared and the present Kurraba Reserve was created.

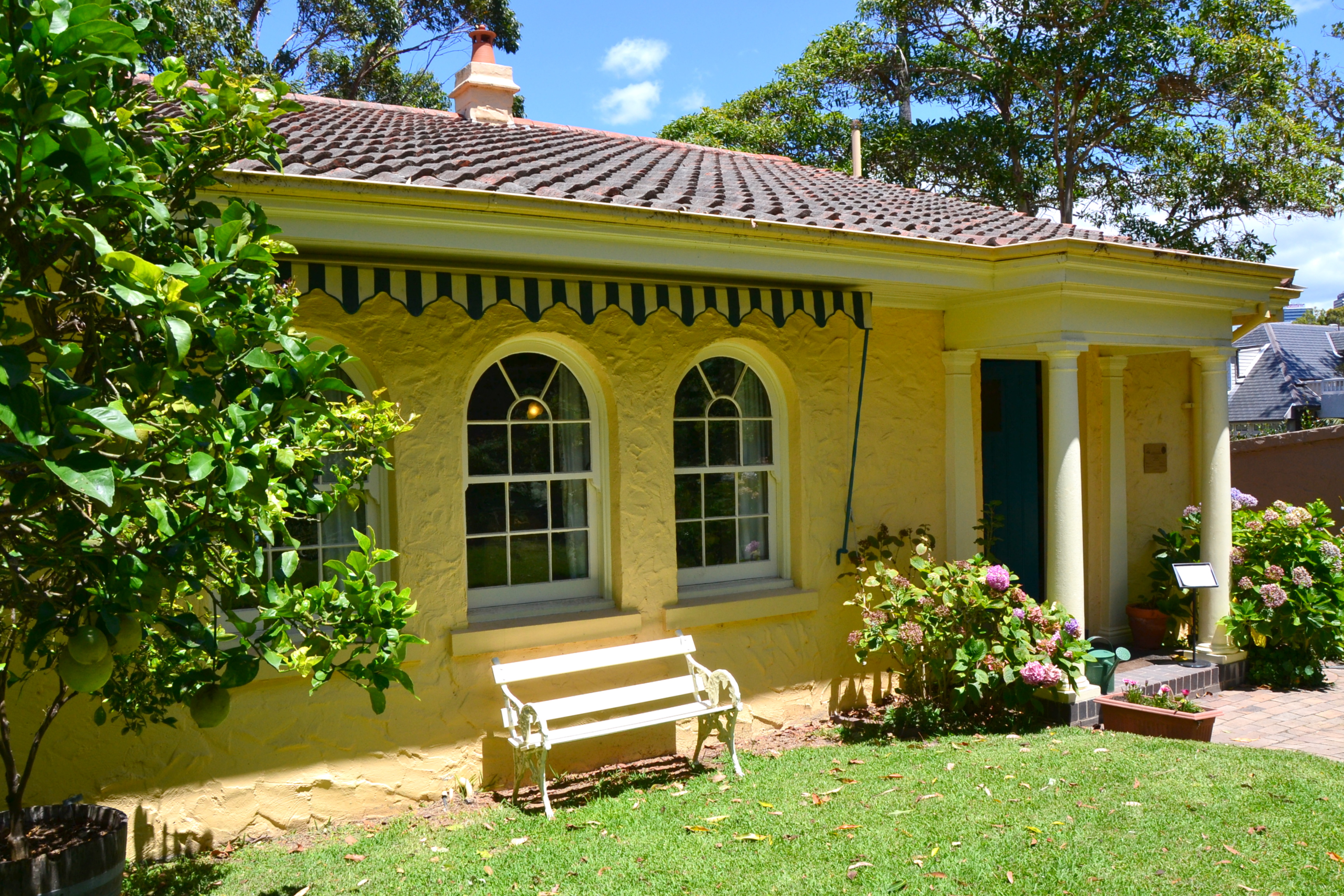
Historic house Nutcote, now operating as a museum.

The renowned children's author and painter May Gibbs lived for many years at Nutcote, a home in Wallaringa Avenue. The house was designed by the architect Bertrand James Waterhouse and built 1924-25. It was later restored and is now open to the public as a museum. It has a state heritage listing.

The suburb name of "Kurraba Point" was taken from the point of land on which it is located, between Neutral Bay and Shell Cove. It was part of the suburb of Neutral Bay until 4 June 2010 when Kurraba Point was formally gazetted as a suburb in its own right.

== Demographics ==
According to the 2021 census, there were 1,401 residents in Kurraba Point. Of these:

- 59.7% of people were born in Australia, and 37.8% of people had both parents born in Australia. The next most common country of birth was England at 8.9%. 80.7% of people only spoke English at home.
- The distribution of ages in Kurraba Point had notably more people in the range 25–34 years (17.9%) than the country as a whole (14.3%), and fewer children. Kurraba Point residents' median age was 43 years, compared to the national median of 38. Children aged under 15 years made up 10.5% of the population (national average is 18.2%) and people aged 65 years and over made up 18.5% of the population (national average is 17.2%).
- The most common employment classifications were professionals (44.3%) and managers (24.3%).
- The median household weekly income in Kurraba Point was $3,047, nearly double the national median of $1,746.
- 79.6% of the occupied private dwellings in Kurraba Point were flats or apartments. This is significantly higher than the national average of 14.2% for these dwelling types. The average household size was 2 people.
- The most common religious affiliations in Kurraba Point were No Religion 43.4%, Catholic 21.6% and Anglican 14.8%. There are no places of worship in the suburb.

== Transport ==
Public transport is well used by residents; the 2016 census found that 33.9% of employed people travelled to work on public transport, which compares favourably to the national average of 11.5%. Conversely, 41.0% travelled to work by car (either as driver or as passenger), which is significantly below the national average of 68.4%.

Kurraba Point ferry wharf is located at Kurraba Point for Neutral Bay ferry services.
Keolis Northern Beaches bus 225 route from Neutral Bay Wharf to Cremorne wharf via Neutral Bay Junction runs along Wycombe Road, on the boundary of Kurraba Point.

The major road which runs the length of Kurraba Point is Kurraba Road, formerly called Thrupps Point Road.

== Landmarks ==
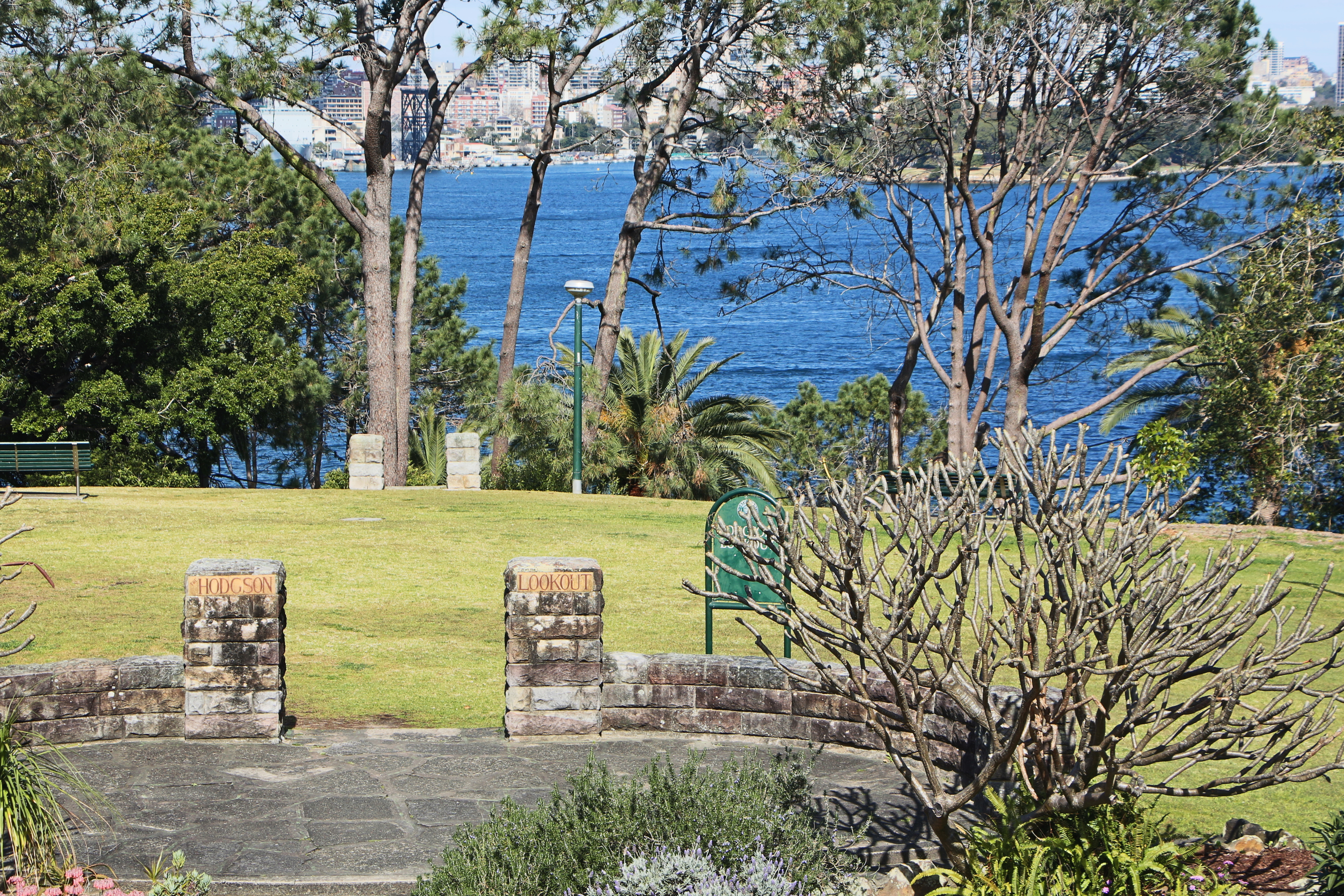
Hodgson Lookout, showing depression era work scheme elements such as the concrete fences and paving.

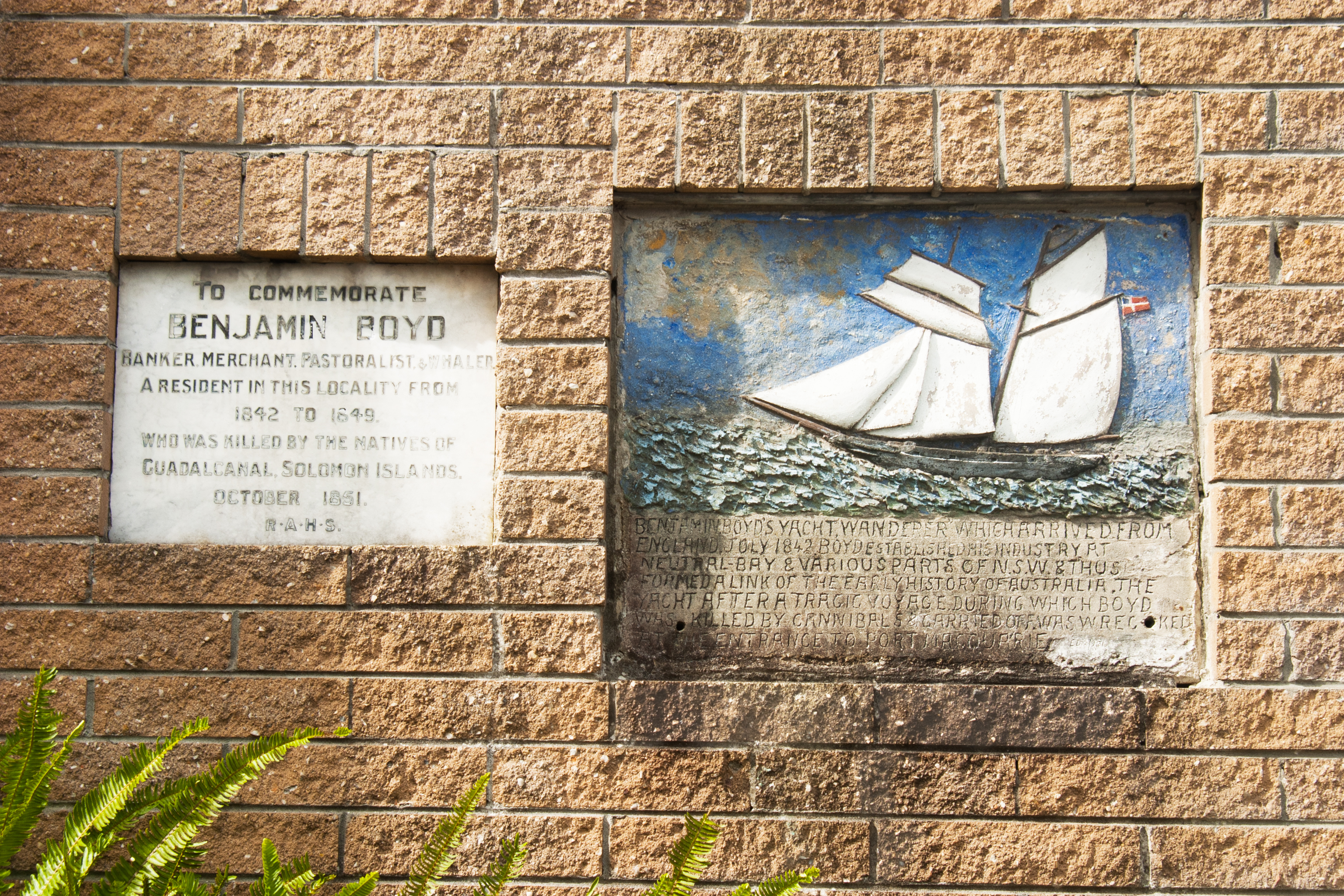
Commemorative plaque at the corner of Ben Boyd Road and Kurraba Road.

General landmarks include:

- Kurraba Point Reserve, including Spains and Hodgson Lookouts with 1930s furniture and depression era work scheme elements such as the concrete fences and paving, and a large flat area which runs along the waterfront.
- Two plaques commemorating the life of Benjamin Boyd are on display at the corner of Ben Boyd Road and Kurraba Road, near the entrance to Kurraba Point. They are heritage listed, but from July 2020 North Sydney Council covered the plaques to protect them from being vandalized.
- The Harbour Swimmers Club is based in Kurraba Point, with men and women taking to the harbour for a swim during the warm months of summer. This is normally associated with a harbour swimmers barbecue.

There are 39 heritage-listed properties in Kurraba Point, and also a substantial Heritage Conservation Area. Significant homes include:

- Brent Knowle (31 Shellcove Road) is described in its Heritage listing as "a picturesque early 20th century gentleman's residence by the eminent Australian architect Bertrand James Waterhouse. It is perhaps his most important early work."
- Gingie (176 Kurraba Road) is a picturesque Queen Anne style house which typifies the area's early development.
- Gundamaine (39 Shellcove Road) is a Federation Queen Anne residence by the architects Spain and Rowe, with "an exceptionally strong visual streetscape element".
- Hollowforth (146 Kurraba Road) is described in its Heritage listing as "a dramatic and innovative architectural statement in the shingle style by one of the leading architects of the Federation era, E. Jeaffreson Jackson. Hollowforth joins with a number of Horbury Hunt's commissions to represent the finest examples of this style within the State."
- Honda (55 Shellcove Road) was the first house built in the area, and one of the first residential developments of the grant to Alfred Thrupp. It is one of the earliest surviving houses on Sydney's north shore.
- Kurraba House (2 Baden Rd) replaces an earlier home of the same name, which is thought to be the inspiration for the name "Kurraba Point". This house was most likely built in the 1850s when John Cooper began to offer 99-year leaseholds from Thrupps Grant. It has now been converted to flats, and has been Heritage listed.
- Nutcote, where the renowned Australian children's author and illustrator May Gibbs lived, is now a visitable house museum on Kurraba Point.
- Once Upon A Time (115A Kurraba Road) is a four-storey building, now divided into three apartments, on a steeply terraced site beside the water at the Kurraba Road wharf. The building has parapets all round, and curved walls with curved windows.
- 9 Shellcove Rd, home of prolific children's author Leslie Rees and writer Coralie Rees.

== Notable residents ==
- Benjamin Boyd lived in Kurraba Point from 1844 to 1849. Ben Boyd Road is named in his honour.
- William Crowle lived in the "Once Upon a Time" residence adjacent to the Kurraba Point wharf between 1940 and his death in 1948.
- May Gibbs lived at Nutcote in Kurraba Point. (At the time, it was part of Neutral Bay.)
