= Neutral Bay =

- Suburb
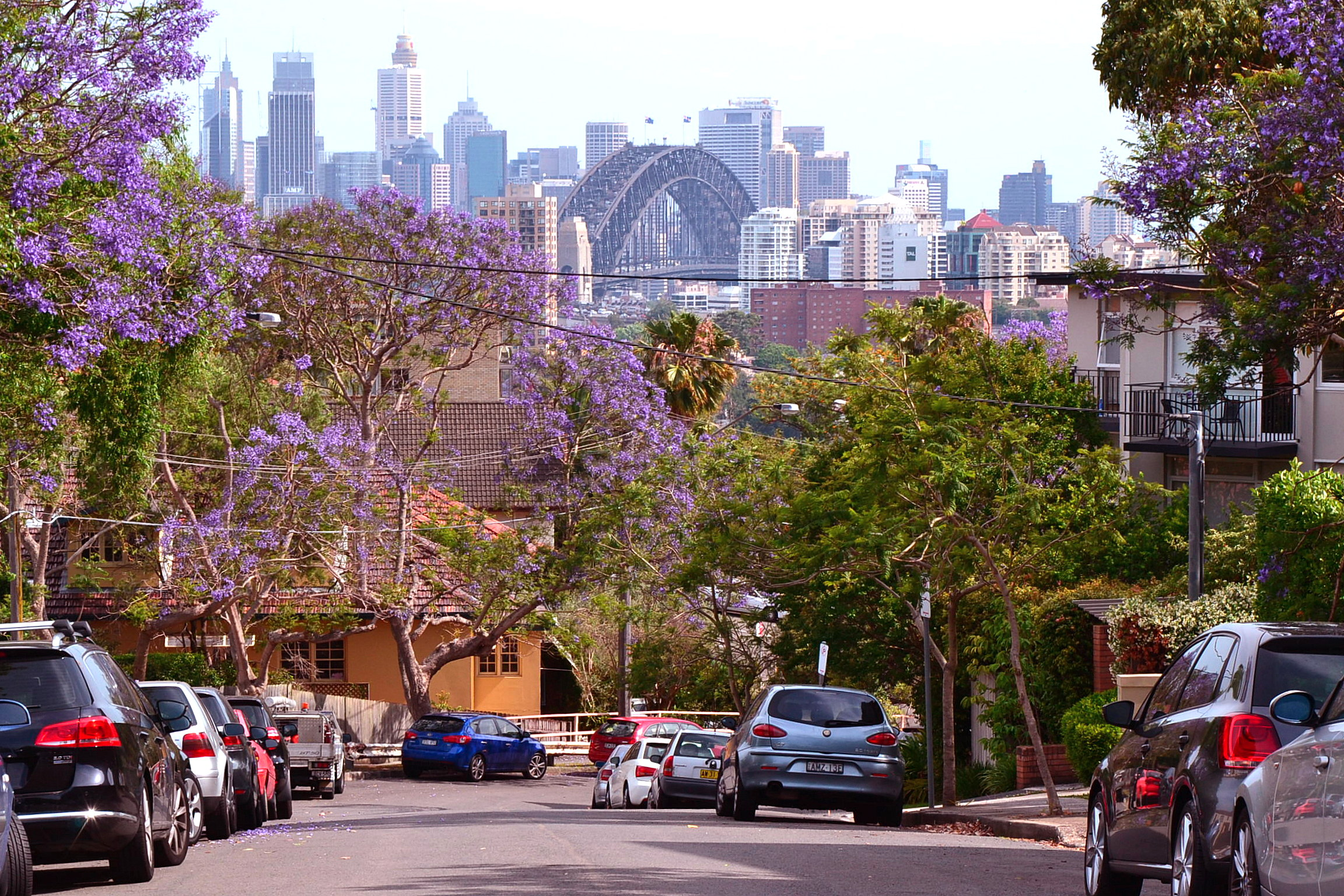
- View from Bent Street

- Interactive map of Neutral Bay
- Coordinates: 33°50′04″S 151°13′06″E
- Country: Australia
- State: New South Wales
- City: Sydney
- LGA: North Sydney Council
- Location: 1.5 km (0.93 mi) N of Sydney CBD

Government
  - State electorate: North Shore
  - Federal division: Warringah

Area
  - Total: 1.6 km^{2} (0.62 sq mi)

Population
  - Total: 10,090 (2021 census)
  - Density: 6,310/km^{2} (16,300/sq mi)
- Postcode: 2089
Suburbs around Neutral Bay
Crows Nest	Cammeray	Cremorne
North Sydney	Neutral Bay	Mosman
Milsons Point	Kirribilli	Cremorne Point

Neutral Bay is a suburb on the Lower North Shore of Sydney, New South Wales, Australia. Neutral Bay is around 1.5 kilometres (1 mile) north of the Sydney central business district, in the local government area of North Sydney Council.

Neutral Bay takes its name from the bay on Sydney Harbour. Kurraba Point, formerly a locality in Neutral Bay, was declared a separate suburb in 2010, sharing the postcode 2089. Surrounding suburbs include North Sydney, Cammeray, Milsons Point, Cremorne and Cremorne Point.

== History ==
The name "Neutral Bay" originates from the time of the early colonial period of Australia, where different bays of Sydney harbour were zoned for different incoming vessels. This bay was where all foreign vessels would dock, hence the name neutral.

The Aboriginal name for the area was 'Wirra-birra'. In 1789, soon after the arrival of the First Fleet in Sydney, Governor Arthur Phillip declared this bay a neutral harbour where foreign ships could anchor and take on water and supplies. Neutral Bay was far enough away from Sydney Cove to discourage convicts from escaping on these vessels and to keep possible enemy ships at a distance from the main settlement.

By the beginning of the 20th century, Neutral Bay and Cremorne were developing as "alternative society suburbs", populated by the kind of people who were attracted to the Arts and Crafts architectural style that was in vogue at the time. This style was an attempt to get away from mass production and give homes the "human touch". Notable examples soon appeared in the area. Brent Knowle, in Shellcove Road (now part of Kurraba Point), was designed by Bertrand James Waterhouse and built in 1914. It influenced home design in the area for at least the next fifteen years and has a state heritage listing.

A different style was used for The Cobbles (now in Kurraba Point), also in Shellcove Road. Designed by Peddle and Thorp and built in 1918, it made great use of natural stones and pebbles to achieve the desired look. It is an Australian interpretation of the California Bungalow style and has a state heritage listing. The Gables, in Spruson Street, was another Waterhouse design and was built in 1920. It was influenced by the "shingle style" which was brought to Sydney by Horbury Hunt, and featured prominent gables and extensive use of shingles. More Waterhouse designs appeared in Shellcove Road in the vicinity of The Cobbles and Brent Knowle (now in Kurraba Point). An outstanding example is Ailsa (now in Kurraba Point), which was designed by Waterhouse for Captain Robert Craig and built in 1908. It has a state heritage listing. Along with Keynsham (now in Kurraba Point), St Anne's (now in Kurraba Point), and Gundimaine House (now in Kurraba Point), these homes form a significant heritage group and have a state heritage listing.

Neutral Bay was also the home of the English-born children's author and painter May Gibbs, who lived for a time in Derry, a two-storey Federation home in Phillips Street. Afterwards, she moved to the home Nutcote in nearby Kurraba Point.

Neutral Bay was the location of the Royal Australian Navy's Submarine Service HMAS Platypus (naval base) between 18 August 1967 and 29 March 1999. It was home to the HMA Oberon submarines, with the first HMAS Oxley arriving at the site on the same day as the commissioning. During World War 2 the site was converted for use as the RAN Torpedo Maintenance Establishment (RANTME).

== Heritage listings ==
Neutral Bay has a number of heritage-listed sites, including:

- 2 Hayes Street: Hastings (Neutral Bay)
- Yeo Street: St John's Uniting Church and Pipe Organ

== Commercial area ==
The main shopping district of Neutral Bay, known as Neutral Bay Junction, is along Military Road, which is the main road that runs through Neutral Bay, Cremorne and Mosman. It features many shops, restaurants and cafes. The Big Bear shopping centre is a shopping mall that features a supermarket and grocery shops. The North Sydney Bears rugby league team took their name from this shopping centre in 1959 after accepting a sponsorship from Big Bear. Keolis Northern Beaches' North Sydney Bus Depot is located behind the Big Bear.

The Oaks Hotel is a well-known and popular venue located on the corner of Military Road and Ben Boyd Road. It opened in 1885 and features a number of restaurants, bars, function rooms and a beer garden with the main focal point an old oak tree. Near the Oaks, shops such as a pizza shop and a bakery can be found on Ben Boyd Road.

Neutral Bay includes several places of worship: there is St Joseph's Catholic Church on Lindsay St, The Bridge Anglican Church on Shellcove Rd (which is also called "Church by the Bridge" or "St Augustine's"), St John's Uniting Church and Sydney Life Church, both on Yeo St. A synagogue can also be found on Yeo Street.

== Transport ==
At the 2016 census, 39.2% of employed people travelled to work on public transport and 36.4% by car (either as driver or as passenger).

The Neutral Bay wharf sits at the end of Hayes Street and it is serviced by both public Neutral Bay ferry services and private ferries.

The Warringah Freeway runs along the western border of Neutral Bay, providing links south to the Sydney CBD and north to Chatswood. Military Road has been a prominent local electoral issue, due to issues relating to the heavy traffic congestion on the road.

== Notable residents ==
- Benjamin Boyd (1801 – 1851) – entrepreneur and politician
- Peter Fitzsimons – journalist, TV and Radio presenter, former rugby player
- May Gibbs (1877 – 1969) – author and illustrator
- Elsa Jacoby (1910 – 1994) – actress and soprano
- Sir John McLaren (1871 – 1958) – public servant
- John Meillon (1934 – 1989) - actor
- Lisa Wilkinson – television presenter

== Demographics ==
Historical population
Year	Pop.	±%
2001	9,601	—
2006	10,278	+7.1%
2011	9,384	−8.7%
2016	10,488	+11.8%
2021	10,090	−3.8%

At the 2021 census, the suburb of Neutral Bay recorded a population of 10,090. Of these:

Age distribution
The distribution of ages in Neutral Bay showed a large proportion in the 25-34 age group (22.1%) compared to the country as a whole (14.3%), with fewer children or seniors. Neutral Bay residents' median age was 38 years, the same as the national median. Children aged under 15 years made up 13.2% of the population (national average is 18.2%) and people aged 65 years and over made up 16.0% of the population (national average is 17.2%).
Ethnic diversity
58.2% of people were born in Australia. The next most common countries of birth were England 6.5%, New Zealand 2.7%, China 2.6%, India 1.7% and South Africa 1.7%. 74.6% of people only spoke English at home. Other languages spoken at home included Mandarin 3.4%, Cantonese 1.7%, Spanish 1.6%, Japanese 1.5% and Portuguese 1.0%.
Religion
This question is optional in the Census. Of the people who answered it, the most common responses were No Religion 45.8%, Catholic 20.7% and Anglican 11.5%.
Income
The median weekly household income was $2,443, compared to the national median of $1,746.
Housing
80.2% of occupied residences were flats or apartments, 10.8% were semi-detached and 8.2% were separate houses. The average household size was 2 people.
Employment
67.6% of residents in Neutral Bay were working full-time, 21.4% part-time, 3.8% were unemployed.

== Schools ==
- Neutral Bay Public School

== Places of worship ==
- Cremorne Synagogue (Orthodox Jewish)
- St Augustine's Anglican Church
- St John's Uniting Church
- St Joseph's Catholic Church
- Spiritualist Church

== Parks and recreation ==
The Norths Pirates Junior Rugby Union Club is the local village Rugby Club, the former Club being known as Cambridge Bay Junior Rugby Union Club. This Club taking its name from Northbridge, Cammeray and Neutral Bay. The Pirates play home games at Tunks Park Cammeray and train at Primrose Park in Cremorne and Anderson Park.

The Neutral Bay Club is a tennis and bowls club situated next to Ilbery Reserve in the centre of Neutral Bay. In continuous operation since 1882, it is one of the oldest licensed clubs in New South Wales. The club features four floodlit tennis courts, a floodlit bowling green surrounded by a heated deck, two function rooms, bistro, sports bar and a members lounge. It runs teams of various levels in the Sydney tennis and bowls leagues.

== Gallery ==
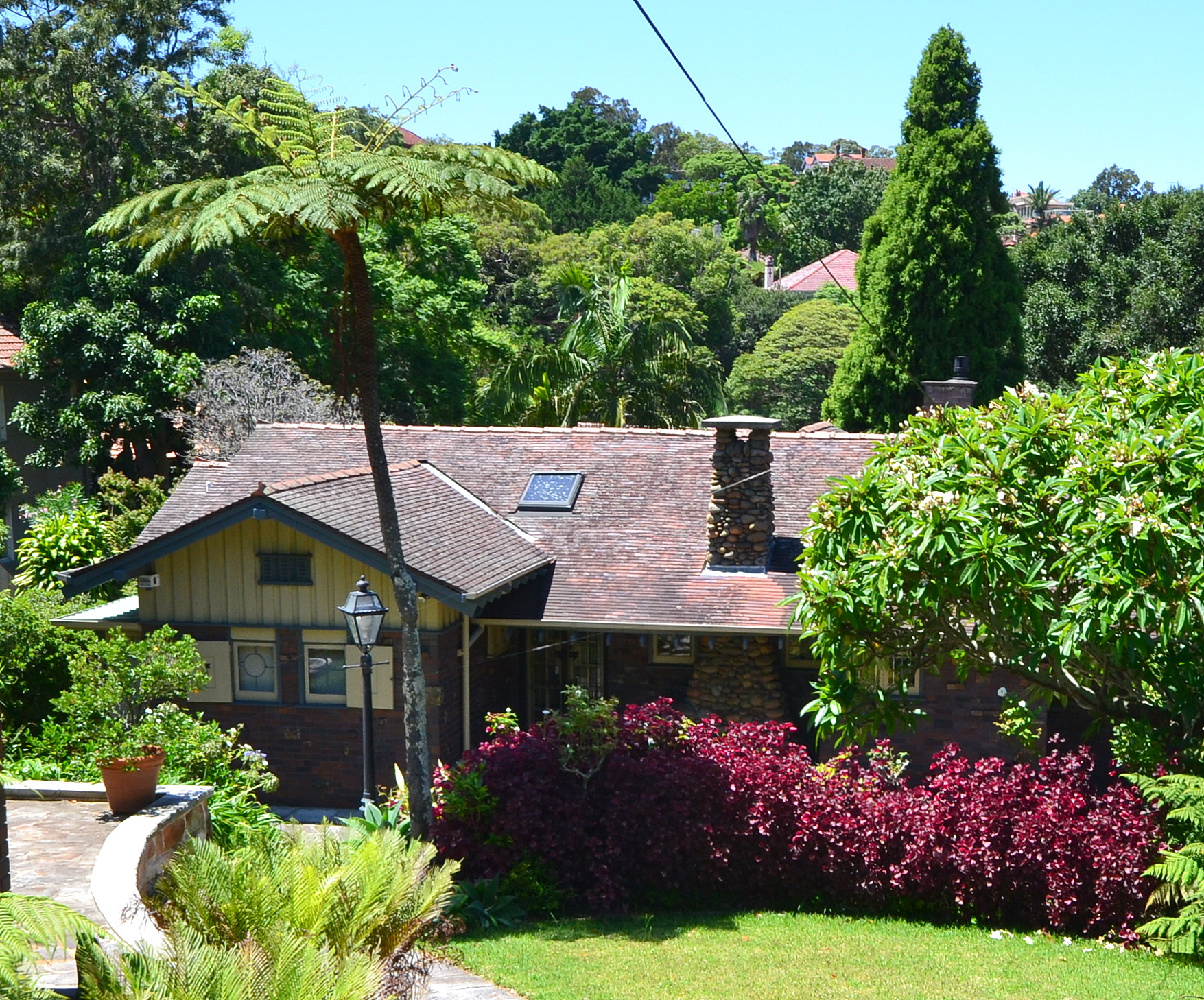
The Cobbles

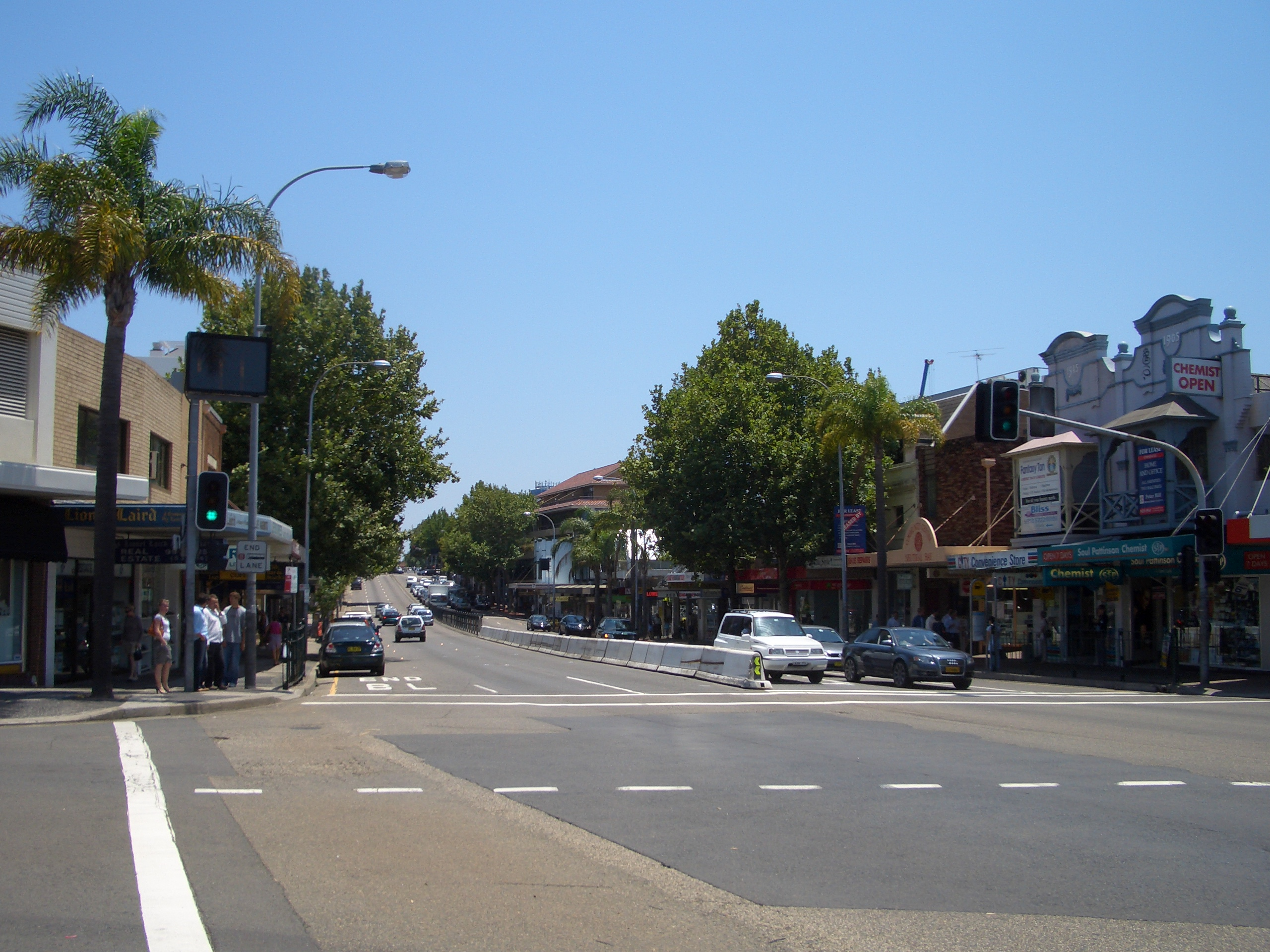
Military Road shopping centre

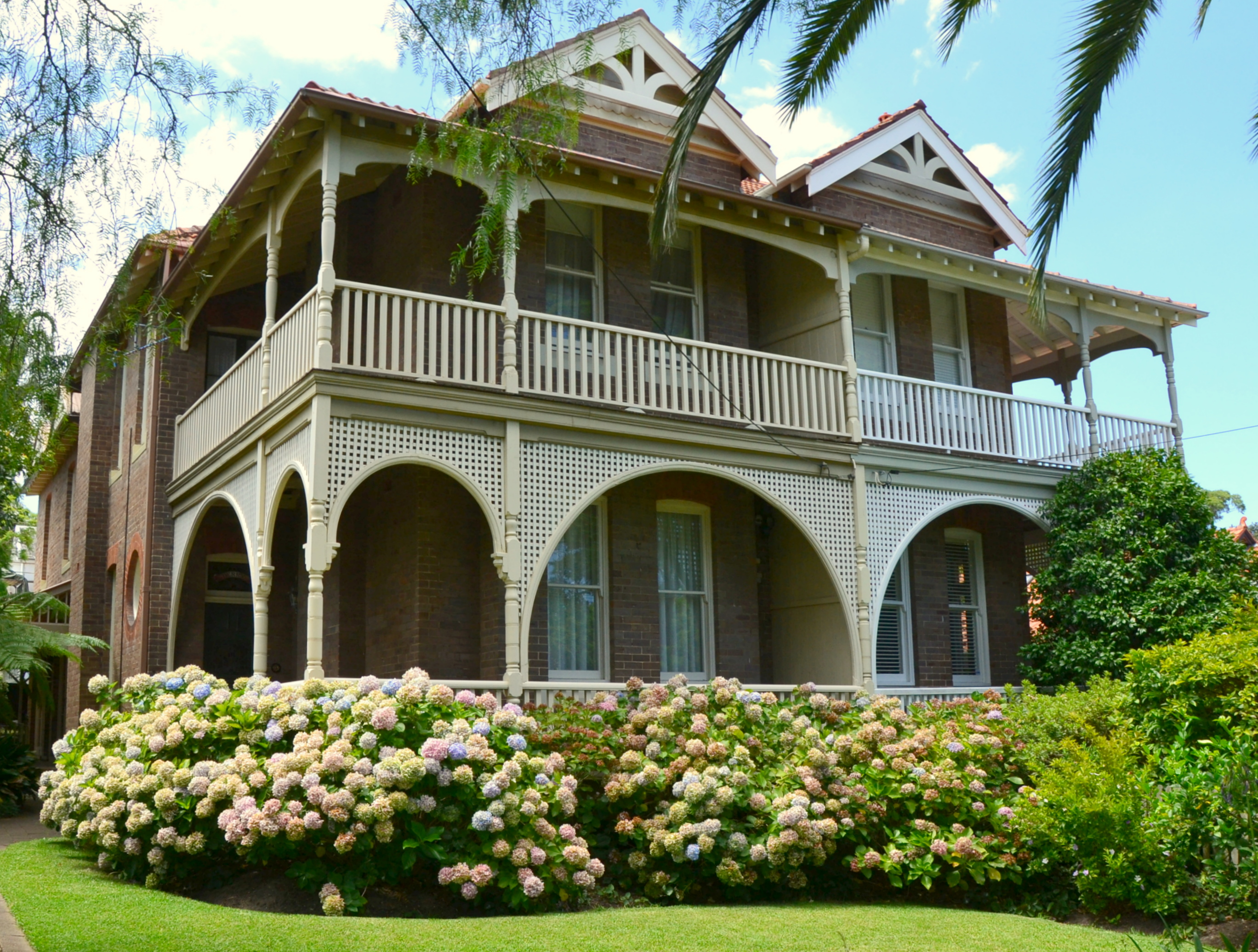
Derry, home of May Gibbs before she lived at Nutcote

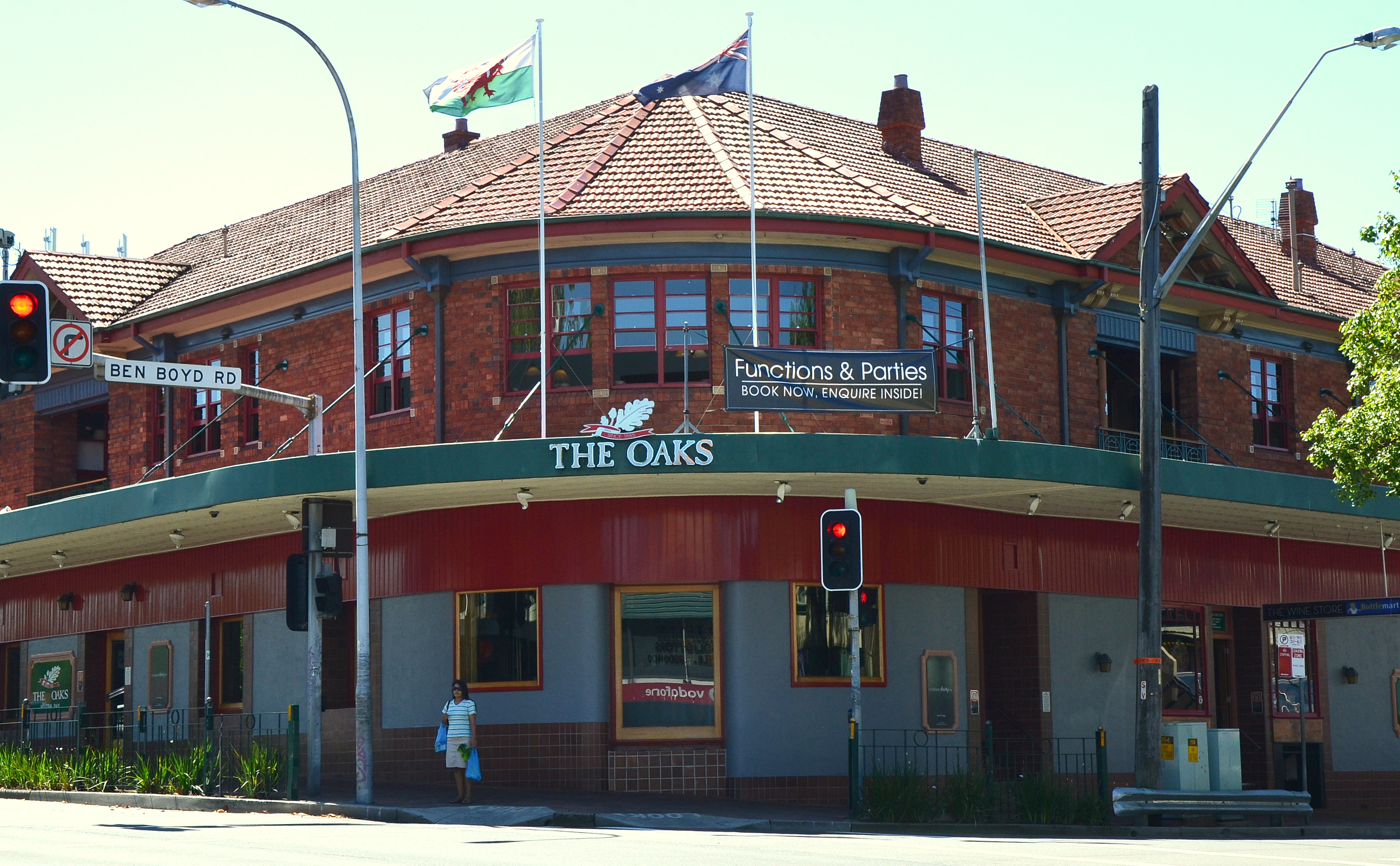
The Oaks Hotel

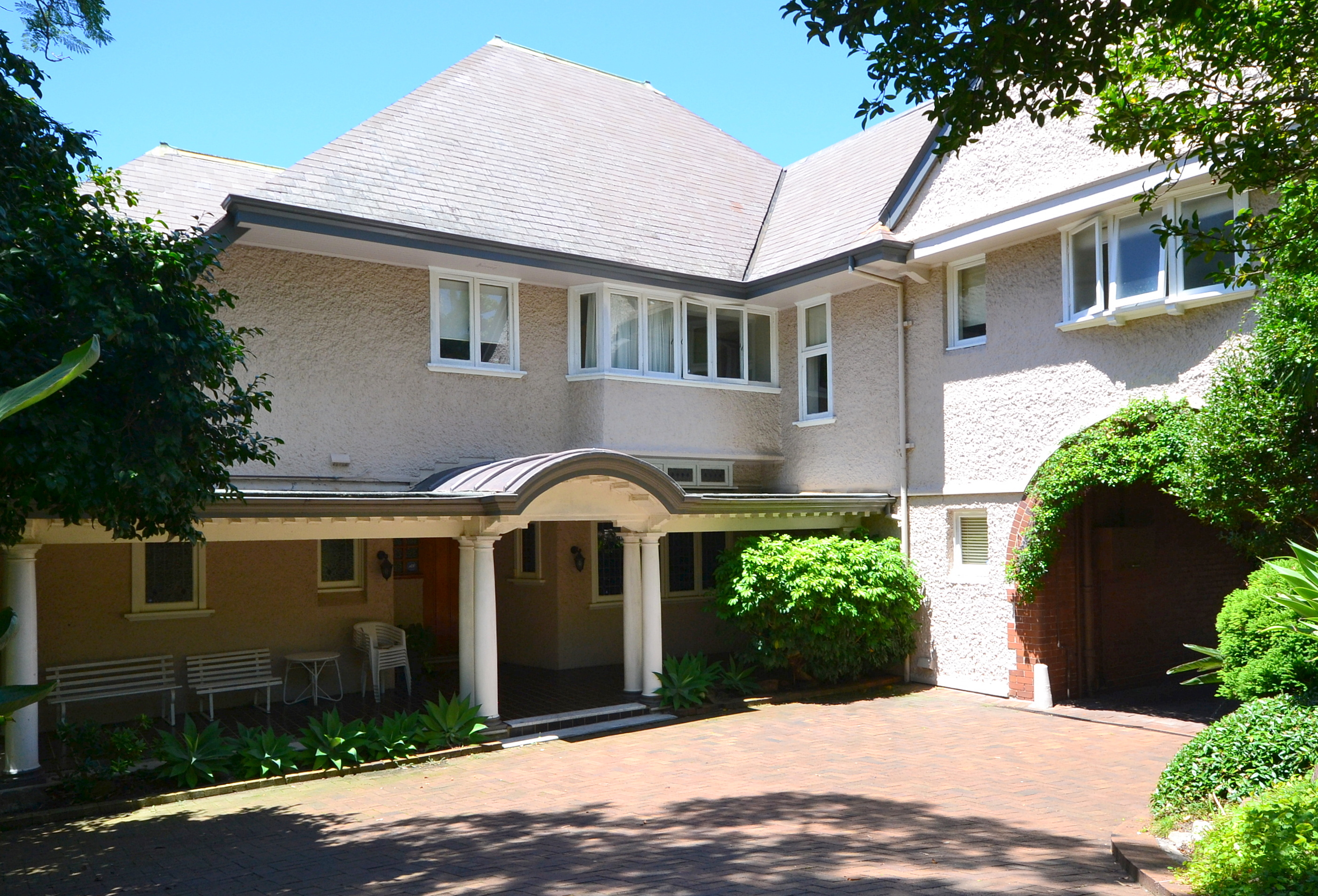
Brent Knowle

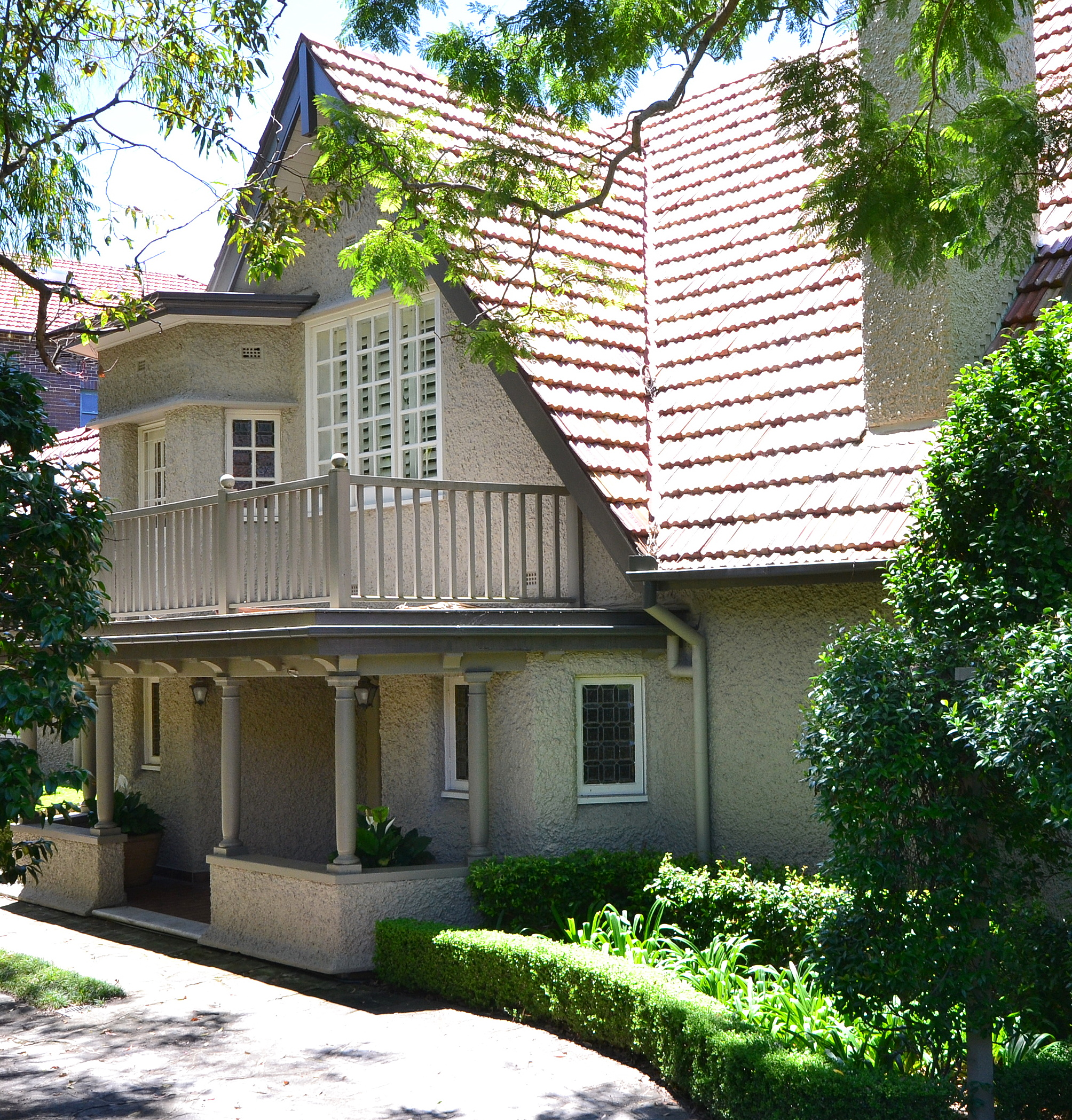
Ailsa
