= W.A. Crowle =

Australian businessman and philanthropist

William Alfred Leopold Crowle
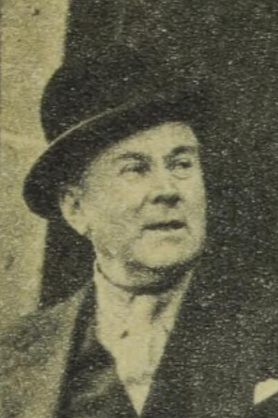
- Born: 12 December 1880; Albury, New South Wales
- Died: 6 December 1948 (aged 67); Kurraba Point, New South Wales
- Other names: W.A. Crowle
- Occupation: Businessman

William Alfred Leopold Crowle (known as W.A. Crowle, 12 December 1880 – 6 December 1948) was an Australian businessman and philanthropist. He was known for his job as an importer, as well as his contributions to architecture and charitable endeavours. His signature phrase was "Once Upon a Time", which he used as the name for one of his residences at Kurraba Point and a halfway house for troubled young men in Ryde.

== Early years ==
Born in Albury, New South Wales, Crowle worked as an electrician in Tasmania and a bicycle mechanic in Adelaide before becoming a car importer in Sydney. He then travelled to the United States to learn electrical engineering and worked under Thomas Edison. As an importer, Crowle introduced Australia to the Wurlitzer organ, Frigidaire refrigerators, and Citroen cars.

== Wyldefel ==
=== Original mansion ===
In 1923, Crowle moved into the Wyldefel mansion at 10 Wylde Street, Potts Point, originally built in 1887. The property featured an extensive art collection obtained by Crowle during his international travels. The bathroom alone cost £3,000 to develop and was considered "one of the most beautiful in Australia", featuring coloured windows from Belgium, a marble fountain and light fittings manufactured in Paris, and an aquarium built into the walls, open to outside light. Crowle and his family lived there around six months of the year, spending the rest of their time travelling overseas.

The property and its terraced waterfront gardens became a popular destination in the decades that followed. Many parties were held there, often as fundraisers for various causes. A Wurlitzer organ was installed at the property and recitals were held live to air on 2FC and 2BL. During the Christmas season, Crowle would have children from Surry Hills (then a slum in the midst of the razor gang era) brought to Wyldefel by the Salvation Army to be fed, entertained and given presents by "Santa Claus."

During this era, Wyldefel was also the residence of Italian Consul-General Marchese Agostino Ferrante di Ruffano and his wife. Several receptions for visiting Italian dignitaries were held there. In an account of one such evening in honour of visiting sailors from the Italian cruiser Armando Diaz, the Sydney Morning Herald recounted that "lights were switched on in the gardens, and many of the guests [...] lingered to admire the lovely effect of the beautiful old garden starred by clusters of lights against the background of the harbour at dusk."

=== Wyldefel Gardens ===
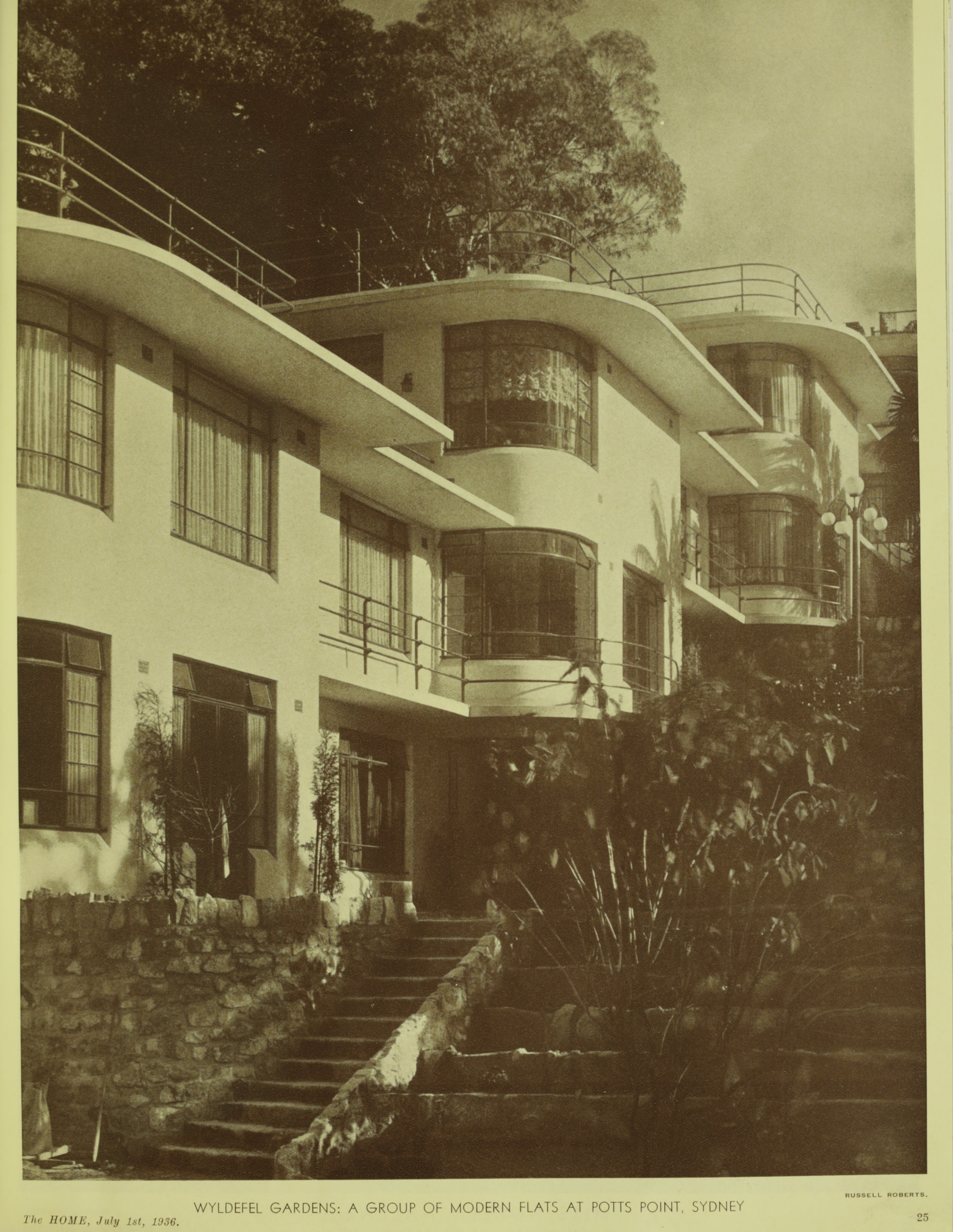
Wyldefel Gardens in 1936

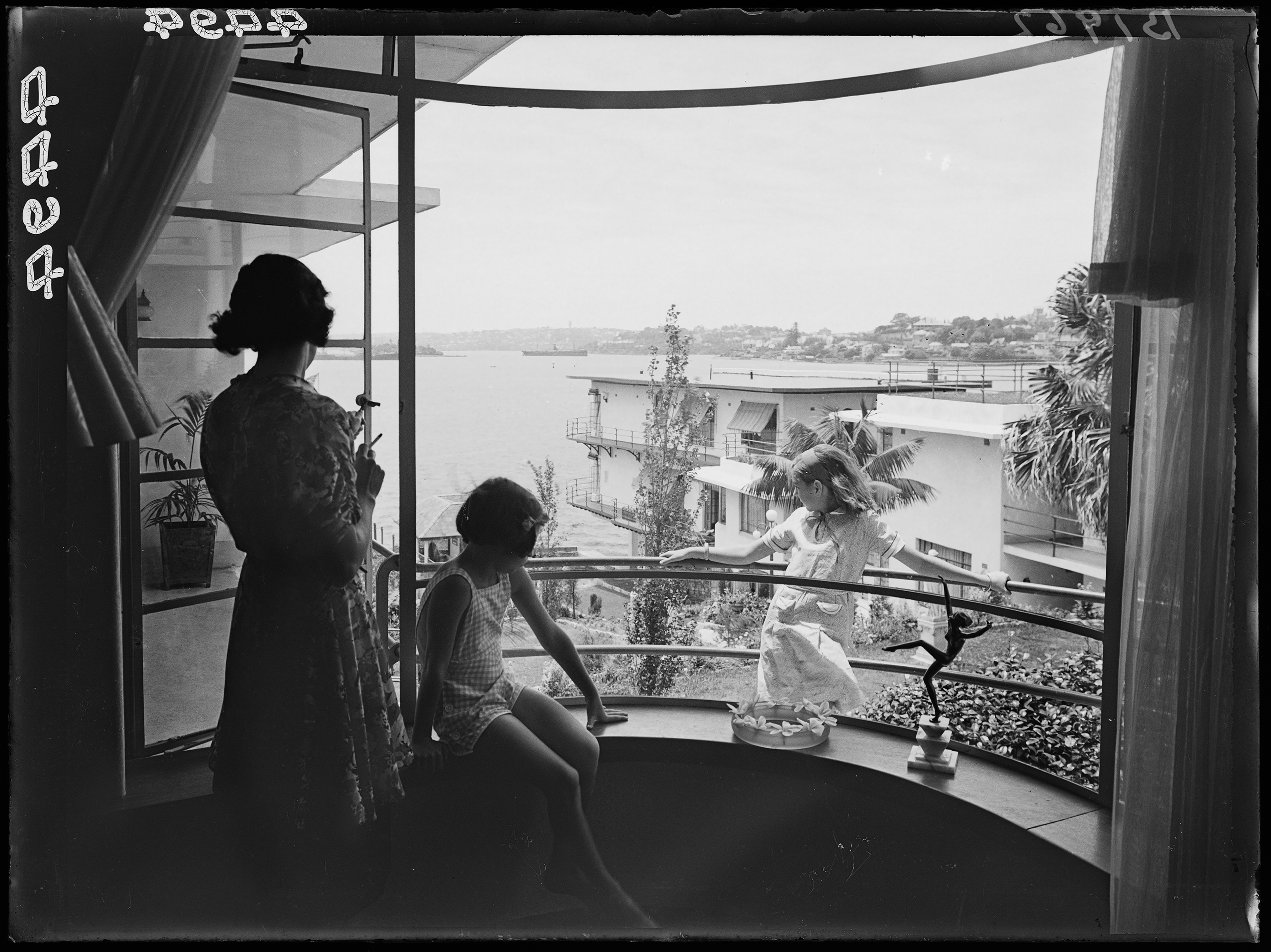
A young family on the balcony of one of the Wyldefel Gardens apartments in 1940, with pre-Kurraba Point "Once Upon a Time" intact and the original pre-Garden Island harbour views.

In 1935, Crowle decided to transform Wyldefel's terraced gardens into a series of sloped apartments to be named Wyldefel Gardens. He funded the redevelopment with an auction of his art collection and also by turning the main mansion on the property into a guest house.

Inspired by a design Crowle had seen in Germany, Wyldefel Gardens featured 20 apartments arranged in four steps with roof gardens for all – except for the waterfront apartment, which Crowle reserved for himself and named "Once Upon a Time." The property also featured a gas-driven clothes heating system and a shared lawn with gazing ball, tennis court and a swimming pool.

=== "Once Upon a Time" in Kurraba Point ===
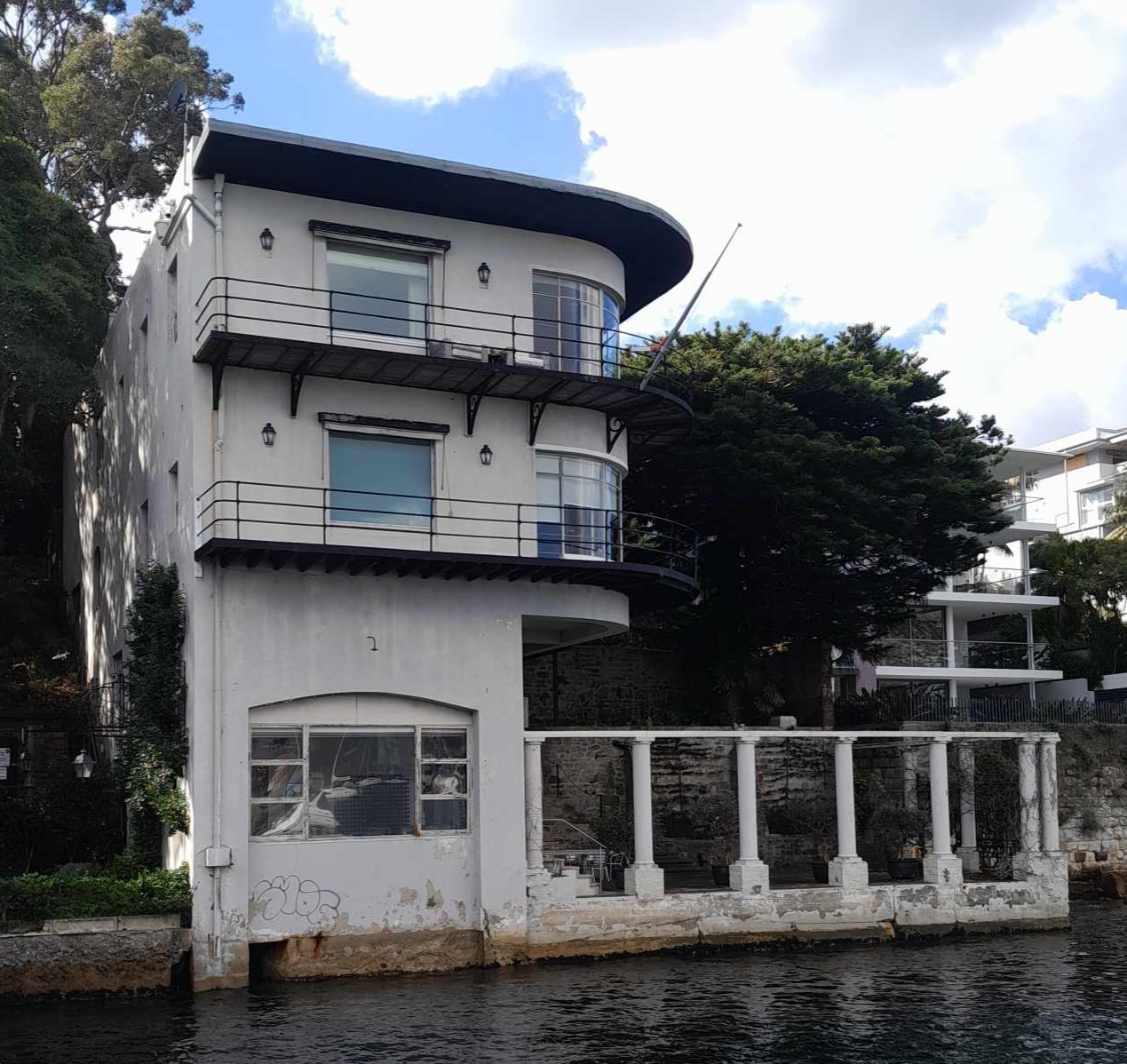
Crowle's "Once Upon a Time" residence, moved brick-by-brick from its original location in Wyldefel Gardens, as seen from the Kurraba Point ferry wharf in 2024.

In 1940, the Royal Australian Navy announced their intention to reclaim land along Wylde Street in order to facilitate access to their new base at Garden Island. This meant that Wyldefel Gardens would lose the lower waterfront section of the property, the remaining apartments would lose their water views to Navy buildings, and Crowle's "Once Upon a Time" apartment would need to be demolished.

Crowle's solution was to transport "Once Upon a Time" across Sydney Harbour, brick-by-brick, and re-establish it at Kurraba Point. The front of the property featured a quote from Goethe: "Live peaceably with all so shalt thou lead a happy life thyself." As the new location was adjacent to the Kurraba Point ferry wharf and the steep steps leading up to Kurraba Road, Crowle also installed a series of quotations on plaques for commuters to read as they hurried up and down, including: "If short my span, I less can spare to pass a single pleasure by. An hour is long if lost in care - they only live who life enjoy."

== "Once Upon a Time" in Ryde ==
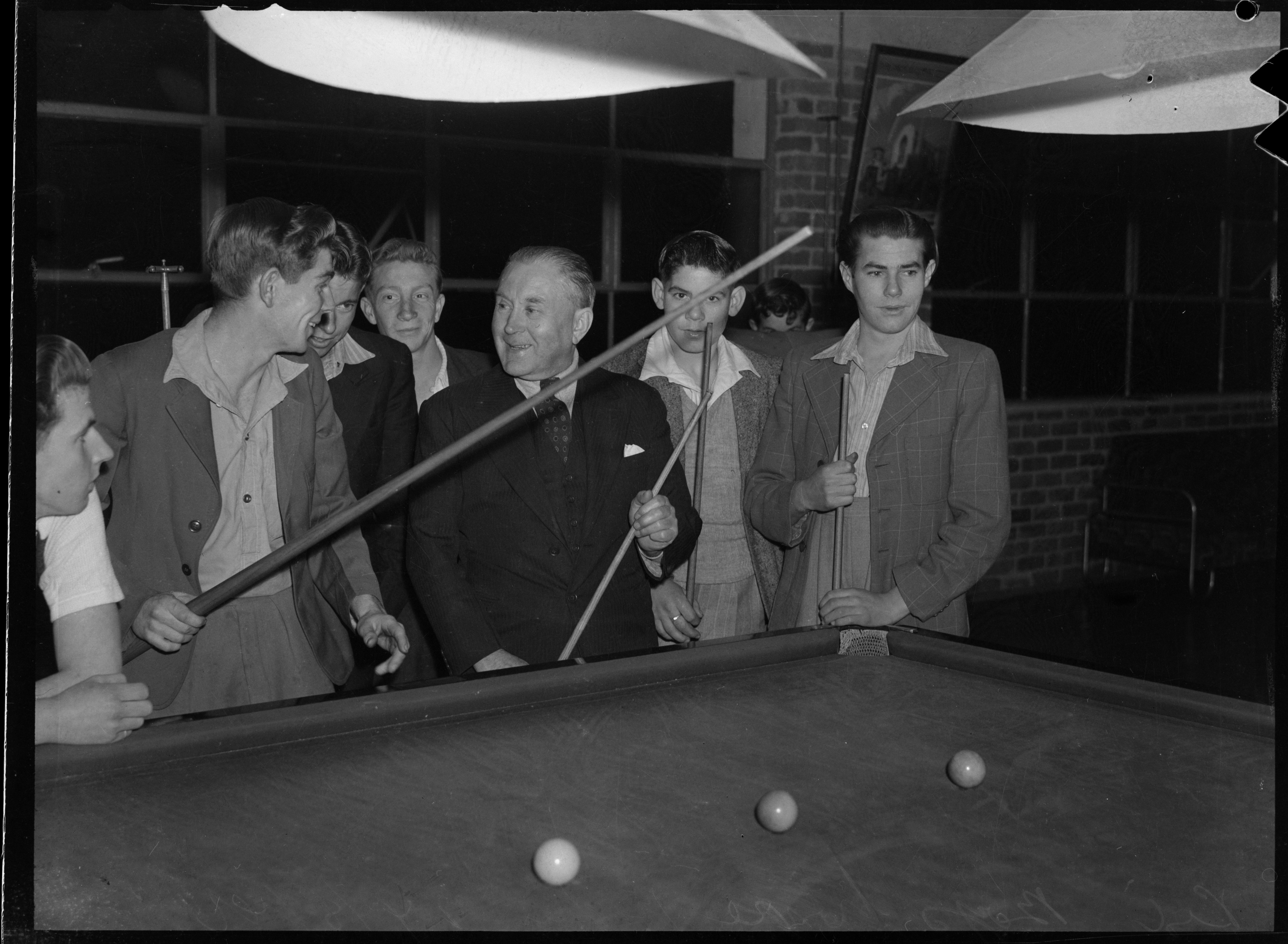
Crowle playing pool with "Once Upon a Time" boys home residents, 1946.

In 1944, Crowle opened a halfway house for young men at 74-76 Belmore Street, Ryde, which he also named "Once Upon a Time." The project, also known as the "W.A. Crowle Boys' Welfare Home" or simply the "Crowle Home", was embarked upon by Crowle in collaboration with Christ Church St Laurence and the Children's Court as an alternative to incarceration.

Described as a "'New Deal' for delinquents", the experimental endeavour was administered by Christ Church St. Laurence's J.R. Maykin. Residents were allowed to attend a cinema unescorted one night a week, to spend Sunday afternoons freely, to receive mail without censorship, to have free access to their parents and also visits from girlfriends. Boys were also placed on controlled diets with white tablecloths and English cutlery for all meals, and given employment in the home's vegetable and poultry farms for which they were obliged to put savings aside. Maykin told The Sun:

I have given the boys the 'freedom of the city', as it were, but fatherly discipline is the watchword at all times... The boys are not being treated as rich men's sons. The institution has taken on the very serious task of making men healthy in mind and body - out of youths who have never had a chance to amount to anything in life.

Above the door of the property was an inscribed quote from Crowle: "What's good in good if there is not a little bad to overcome?" Other quotes featured throughout the property included "Experience is the name men give to their mistakes", attributed to Oscar Wilde, and "Success is always a lonely job."

In 1945, several residents threw a party at the house to mark the retirement of Magistrate F. Grugeon, who had sentenced them to "Once Upon a Time" residence in the Children's Court. Grugeon attended in person and was presented with a gift briefcase. The unusual occasion was documented in The Sun, who quoted an anonymous 17-year-old resident:

If anyone had tried to tell me 12 months ago that I'd be standing here making a presentation to a magistrate, I'd have told them they were plain nuts. Between cops and magistrates and child welfare inspectors, I've hardly had a minute's peace for years... This time I got a bit of a break, and along with most of the other kids here, I do appreciate it.

== Other endeavours ==
In 1946, Crowle obtained several stones from the ruin of the House of Commons in London, which had been destroyed during The Blitz. He offered to distribute them to universities, war memorials and the Australian Parliament in Canberra "to enable young people to gaze upon them and absorb some of the history attached to them." Many institutions rejected his offer, and it is not known if any accepted. One of the stones was displayed by Crowle above the fireplace at "Once Upon a Time" Ryde and another, in the form of a gargoyle, at "Once Upon a Time" Kurraba Point.

That same year he was also fined £100 for failing to keep proper books in regard to the supply of liquor at Rose's Restaurant, for which he was formerly the proprietor.

== Death ==
Crowle died at "Once Upon a Time" Kurraba Point on 6 December 1948. Three days later, his funeral service was held at Ernest Andrews Chapels in Chatswood. Thirty young male residents of "Once Upon a Time" Ryde formed a guard of honour, each wearing white carnations with black ribbons. Reverend C.K. Kenderdine spoke at the service, saying Crowle had built "Once Upon a Time" Ryde "not to make life easy for the boys, but to make it less hard." Wilfrid Thomas, a friend of Crowle's, read the Rudyard Kipling poem, "L'Envoi." Crowle was then cremated at the Northern Suburbs Crematorium in North Ryde.

By request of the "Once Upon a Time" Ryde residents, his ashes were placed in an antique sundial fountain at the house. A newspaper notice in honour of his passing was placed by the local United Grand Lodge, revealing that Crowle had been a Freemason. In his final days, Crowle prepared Christmas messages for his friends that began arriving in the mail in the weeks after his death.

== Legacy and fate of his buildings ==
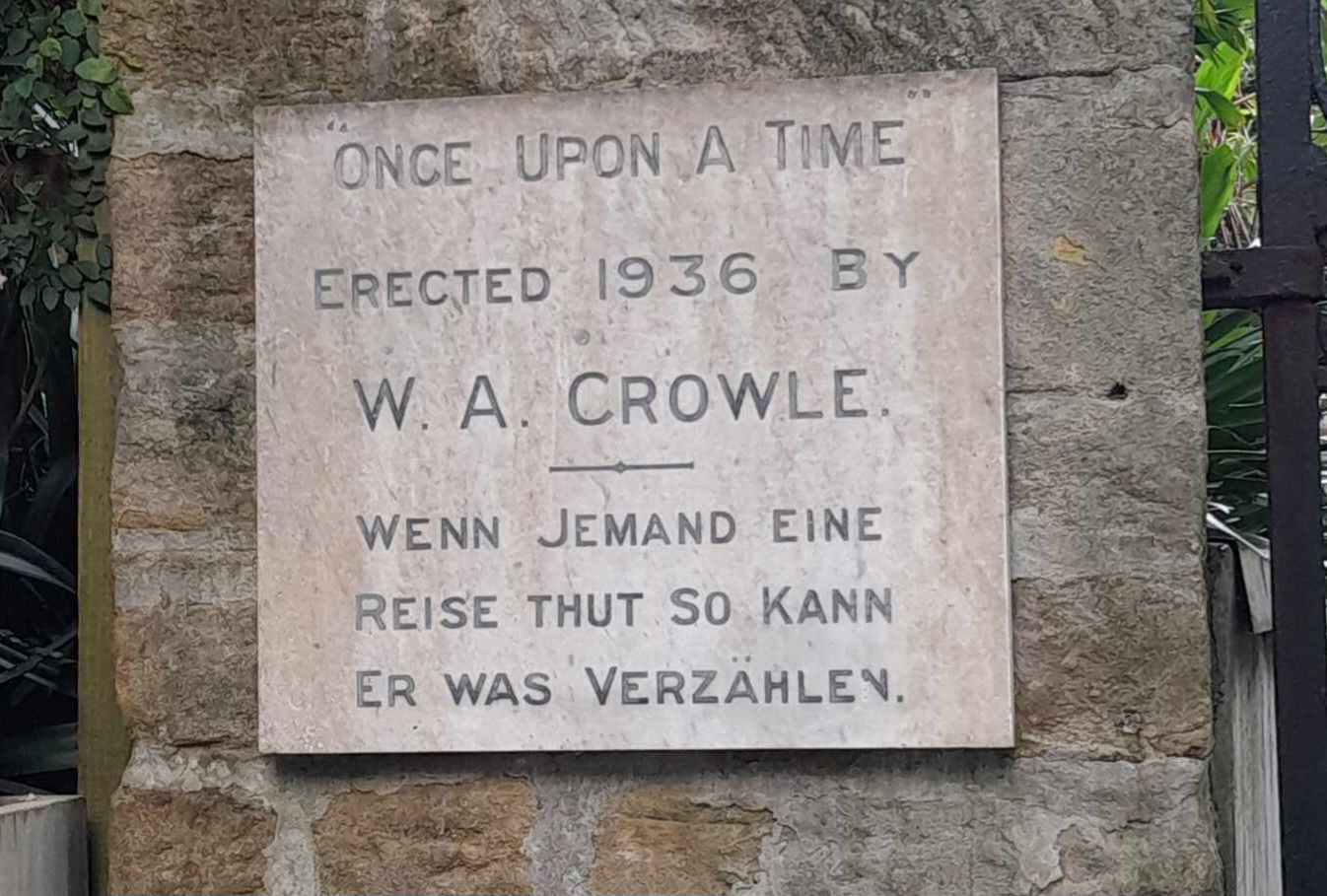
Marble plaque at the entrance to "Once Upon a Time" Kurraba Point, featuring a quote from Goethe in German that translates as "Live peaceably with all so that thou shalt lead a happy life thyself", as seen in 2024.

In 1952, "Once Upon a Time" Ryde was handed over to the Sub-Normal Children's Welfare Association. It remained in use as a rehabilitative home for disabled children for the rest of the 20th century. In 2000, June Madden published a book about the history of "Once Upon a Time" Ryde, entitled A Home of Distinction. In 2009, the home was passed to a private disability service provider named Achieve Australia. It was later developed into apartments, despite protests from locals and Crowle descendants.

Crowle's art collection and belongings were auctioned off at least four more times - in 1959, 1968, 1979 and 1985. Amongst the auctioned works was John Finnemore's The signing of the treaty of peace at Versailles, 28 June 1919, which is now on display at the Australian War Memorial.

The original Wyldefel mansion was demolished in the 1960s, but the Wyldefel Gardens apartments remain intact in Potts Point today and are considered premium real estate. "Once Upon a Time" Kurraba Point also still stands and is still an active residence. For many years Crowle's original "If short my span" plaque was hung next to the stairs leading up from the Kurraba Point ferry wharf, but as of 2024 it seems to have been removed and may or may not return. Still visible to ferry commuters is the Goethe quote plaque that Crowle unveiled to dedicate the building, serving as a permanent reminder of his contributions to Australian society.
