= Hollowforth =

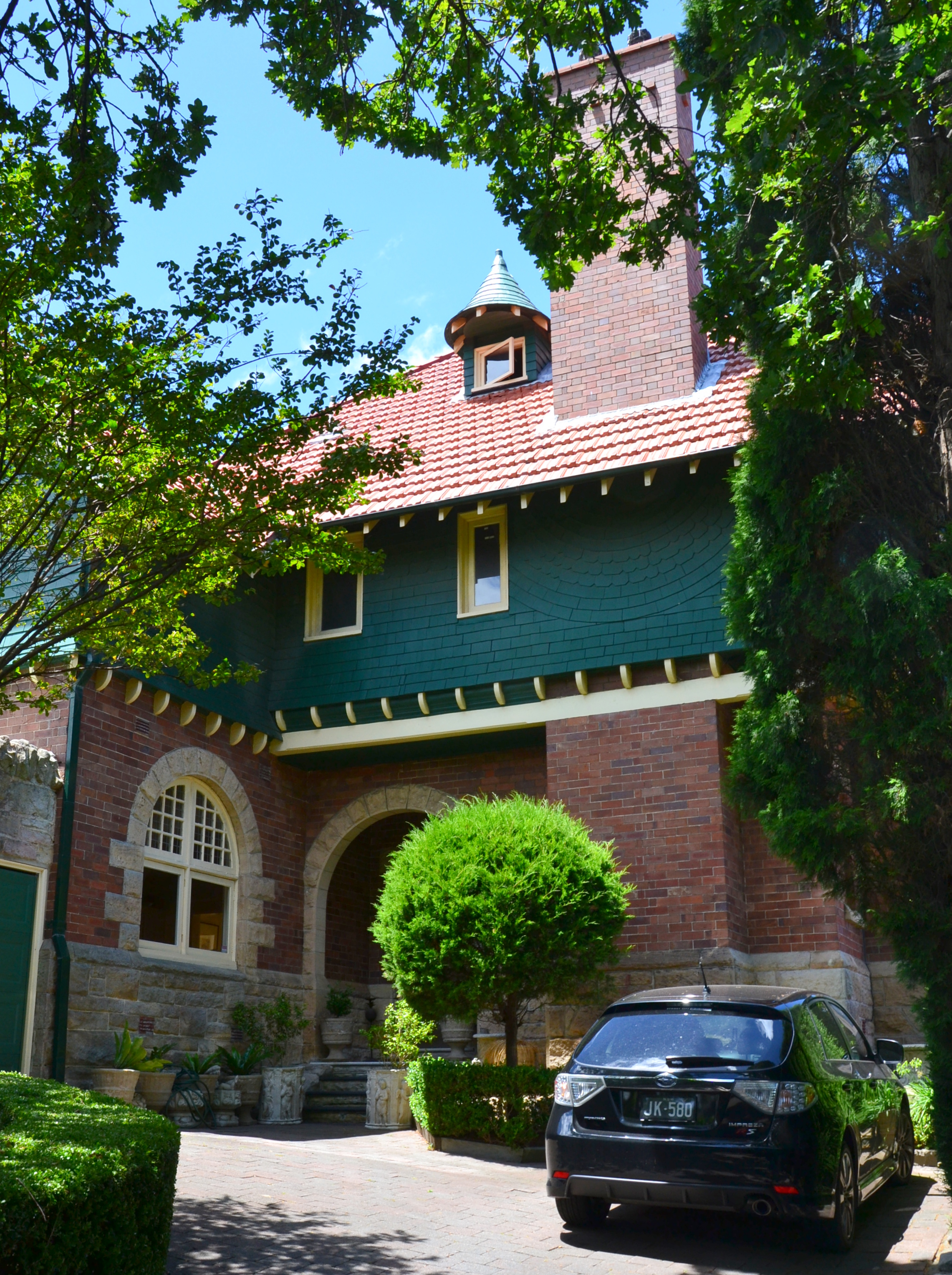
- Hollowforth, pictured in 2012.

- Location within Sydney Location within Australia
- 33°50′29″S 151°13′22″E
- Location: 146 Kurraba Road, Kurraba Point, North Sydney Council, New South Wales, Australia

History
- Built: 1893–1893
- Built for: Professor Richard Threlfall

Site notes
- Architects: Edward Jeaffreson Jackson; in association with S. G. Thorp
- Architectural style: Federation Arts and Crafts

New South Wales Heritage Register
- Official name: Hollowforth
- Type: State heritage (built)
- Designated: 2 April 1999
- Reference no.: 450
- Type: House
- Category: Residential buildings (private)

Hollowforth is a heritage-listed residence in Kurraba Point, New South Wales, a suburb of Sydney, Australia. It was designed by Edward Jeaffreson Jackson and in association with S. G. Thorp and built from 1893 to 1893. The property is privately owned. It was added to the New South Wales State Heritage Register on 2 April 1999.

== History ==
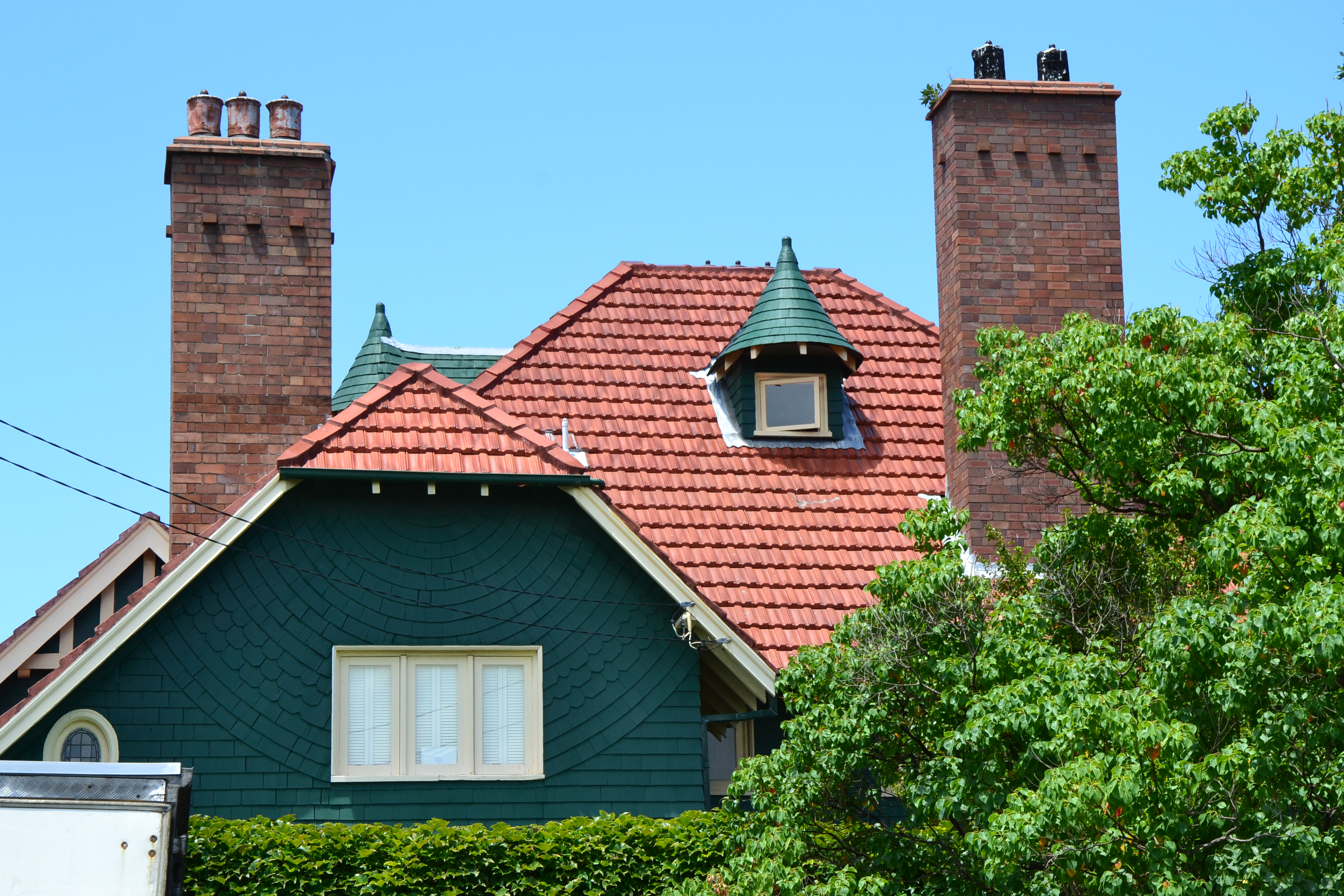
Detail of the Hollowforth gables, pictured in 2012.

Hollowforth was completed in 1893 as the home of Professor Richard Threlfall. The house was designed by E. Jefferson Jackson in association with S. G. Thorp.

A billiard room with bedroom over was added to the garden front on the eastern elevation by architects Spain and Cosh in 1913 and for the then owner A. H. Way Esq.

Sir Richard Threlfall (1861-1932), physicist and chemical engineer, was born on 14 August 1861 at Hollowforth, near Preston, Lancashire, England, the eldest son of Richard Threlfall, a small landholder, wine merchant and sometime mayor of Preston, and his second wife Sarah Jane, née Mason. Threlfall was educated at Clifton College, Bristol, where he shared a study with (Field Marshal Lord) Haig, and at Gonville and Caius College, Cambridge. He also read mathematics privately with W. J. Ibbetson and, midway through his course, studied at the University of Strasbourg under August Kundt and Rudolph Fittig. On graduating with first-class honours in the natural sciences tripos, he lectured at his college and worked as a demonstrator in the Cavendish Laboratory under his friend J. J. Thomson.

In 1886 Threlfall was appointed to the chair of physics at the University of Sydney. He was exactly the right person to bring its somewhat moribund teaching into line with the best modern practice, for his training had instilled in him the latest vision of the subject: a body of knowledge expressed in the language of mathematics, but grounded upon laboratory practice characterized by ever-increasing precision of measurement. Despite having lost several fingers while experimenting with explosives, Threlfall was an outstanding manipulator of apparatus whom Thomson regarded as "one of the best experimenters I ever met".

Fired with a passion for research and a determination to create in Sydney a major centre of physical inquiry, immediately upon his arrival Threlfall launched an extensive series of projects using equipment he had bought, without authorization, in Europe. By sheer force of personality, he soon prevailed upon the university and the colonial government to provide him with a splendid new building (completed in 1888) in which to house it. Threlfall's research developed along three separate lines. One, on explosives and the propagation of explosions, led to his being used as a consultant by the local military authorities. Another involved the electrical properties of dielectric materials such as sulphur and selenium. Finally, Threlfall and his student and friend J. A. Pollock developed a quartz thread torsion balance for use as a gravity meter, and then used this to make measurements in a wide range of eastern Australian localities. Through scientific correspondents in Europe and North America, of whom Thomson was by far the most important to him, Threlfall kept abreast of developments in his field. Leaving Australia in 1898, he found a congenial position as director of research with Albright & Wilson, chemical manufacturers, at Oldbury, England. Shortly afterwards he joined their board and was elected a fellow of the Royal Society, London, in 1899.

He retained the lease to the land until the department store owner Arthur H. Way, chairman of E. Way & Co. in Pitt Street, acquired the lease in 1908 and bought the freehold title to the land in 1913.

== Description ==
Hollowforth reflects the Art Nouveau influence the theme of which is carried through into the fluid geometric pattern of the shingled wall surfaces. Its roof is a dramatic composition of stepped hips, broken gables, massive brick chimneys and dormer windows with conical caps. The shingled upper walls are bellcast over the lower brick walls supported on a sandstone base. The variety of window forms is typical of the period. The interior contains several fine Art Nouveau features such as leadlighting, tapered stair balusters and joinery details. Prior to its conversion into 2 strata units, the house was being used as 13 flatettes.

A dramatic and innovative architectural statement in the shingle style by one of the leading architects of the Federation era, E. Jeaffreson Jackson. Hollowforth joins with a number of Horbury Hunt's commissions to represent the finest examples of this style within the State. The fine landscape setting contributes to the significance of the property. The interior room configuration is significant as is the room size and detailing.

== Heritage listing ==
Hollowforth was listed on the New South Wales State Heritage Register on 2 April 1999 having satisfied the following criteria.

The place has a strong or special association with a person, or group of persons, of importance of cultural or natural history of New South Wales's history.

Hollowforth's architect E. Jefferson Jackson is regarded as a leading architect of the period and the house ranks alongside a number of Horbury Hunt's commissions as the finest examples of the shingle style within the State.

The place is important in demonstrating aesthetic characteristics and/or a high degree of creative or technical achievement in New South Wales.

Hollowforth which is both innovative and bold is an outstanding example of the American shingle style displaying further influence by the Art nouveau and Federation Arts and Crafts movement.

Situated on a curve within the road, Hollowforth forms an important streetscape element complementing the style of its neighbours.

== See also ==
- Australian residential architectural styles
