= May Gibbs =

Australian artist, writer (1877–1969)

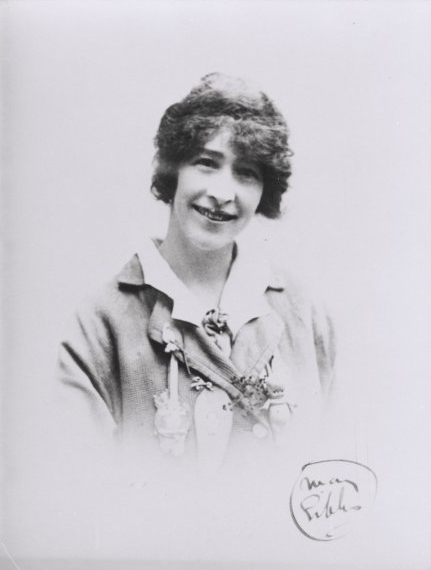
- 1916 photographic portrait
- Born: 17 January 1877; Sydenham, London, England
- Died: 27 November 1969 (aged 92); Sydney, New South Wales, Australia
- Occupations: Author, illustrator
- Writing career
- Pen name: Stan Cottman, Blob
- Period: 1912–1953
- Genre: Children's literature
- Website: maygibbs.org

Cecilia May Gibbs MBE (17 January 1877 – 27 November 1969) was an Australian children's author, illustrator, and cartoonist. She is best known for her gumnut babies (also known as "bush babies" or "bush fairies"), and the book Snugglepot and Cuddlepie.

== Early life ==
Gibbs was born in Sydenham, London, England, to Herbert William Gibbs (1852 – 4 October 1940) and Cecilia Gibbs, née Rogers (c. 1851 – 26 March 1941), who were both talented artists. She was their second child, and as she was named after her mother, had the nickname "Mamie".

The family planned to move to South Australia to set up a farm in 1879 due to Herbert's failing eyesight, the result of a boyhood injury. However, as Gibbs had caught the measles, her father and uncle George Gordon Gibbs (c. 1860 – 24 August 1921) went to Australia, leaving her mother in England to care for the children.

On 1 June 1881, the Gibbs brothers arrived in South Australia, and began to look for the land arranged for them by a relative of theirs. Over the next few months, the brothers became disillusioned with the land. Cecilia discovered that she was pregnant again, and decided to make the voyage to Australia with her children. Despite her parents' dismay, Cecilia and the children left, and her third child, Ivan, was born at sea.

A drought in the area caused the family to move again, to Norwood. In 1885, the family moved again to a farm property in Harvey, Western Australia. At the age of eight, Gibbs was given a pony named Brownie by her father. May enjoyed exploring the bush riding her pony, and began to paint and write about the bush at this time. This period of her childhood, and her imaginative interpretation of the bush, was formative in the development of the anthropomorphic bush setting found in her work. When Gibbs was 10, the family moved to Perth, where she was educated at Amy Best's girls' school in Perth.

A "Banksia Man" abducting Little Ragged Blossom, from Snugglepot and Cuddlepie.

Portrait of May Gibbs, Australian writer and illustrator in her studio, Bridge Street, Sydney, c. 1920

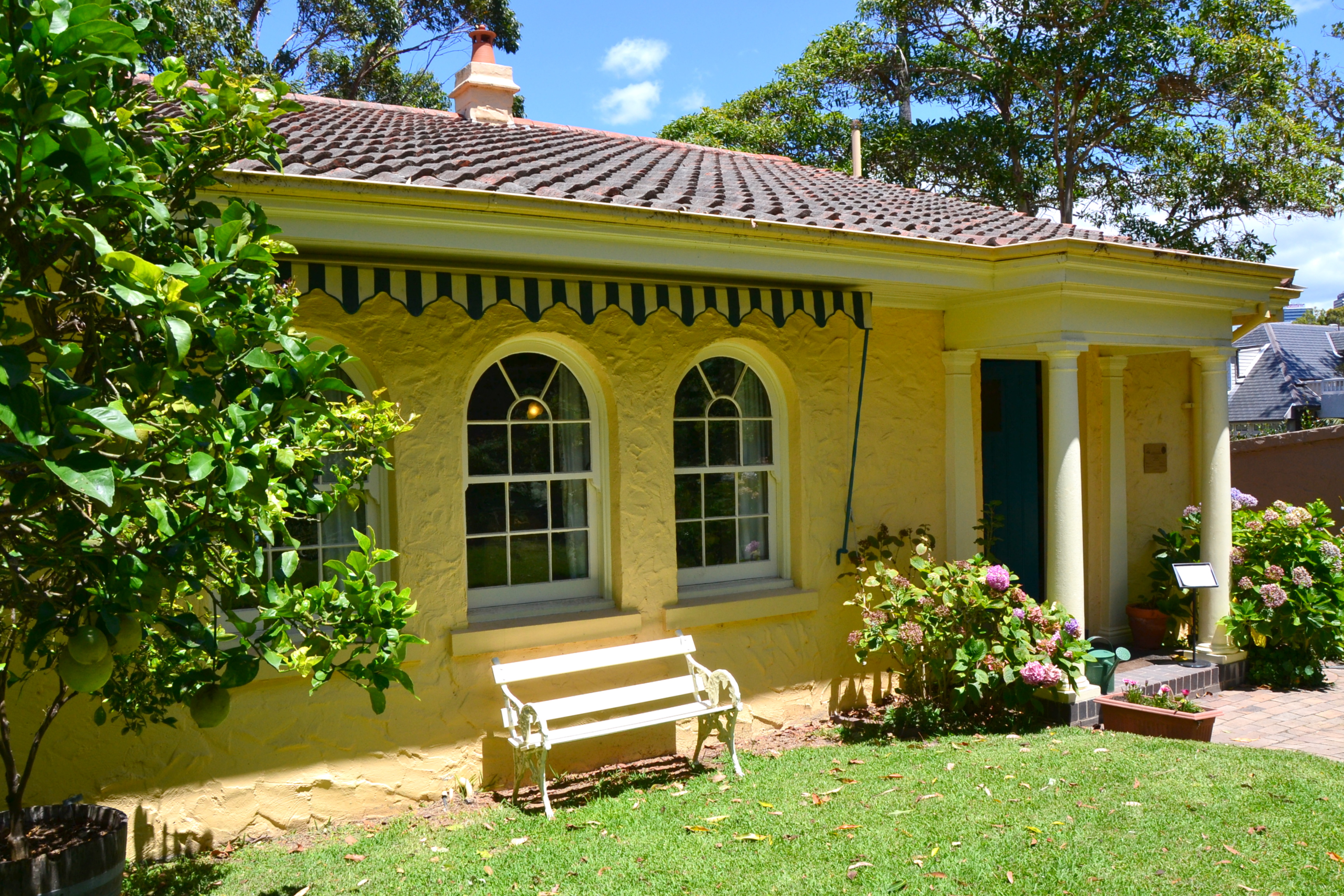
Nutcote, in Kurraba Point (Sydney), where May spent much of her life.

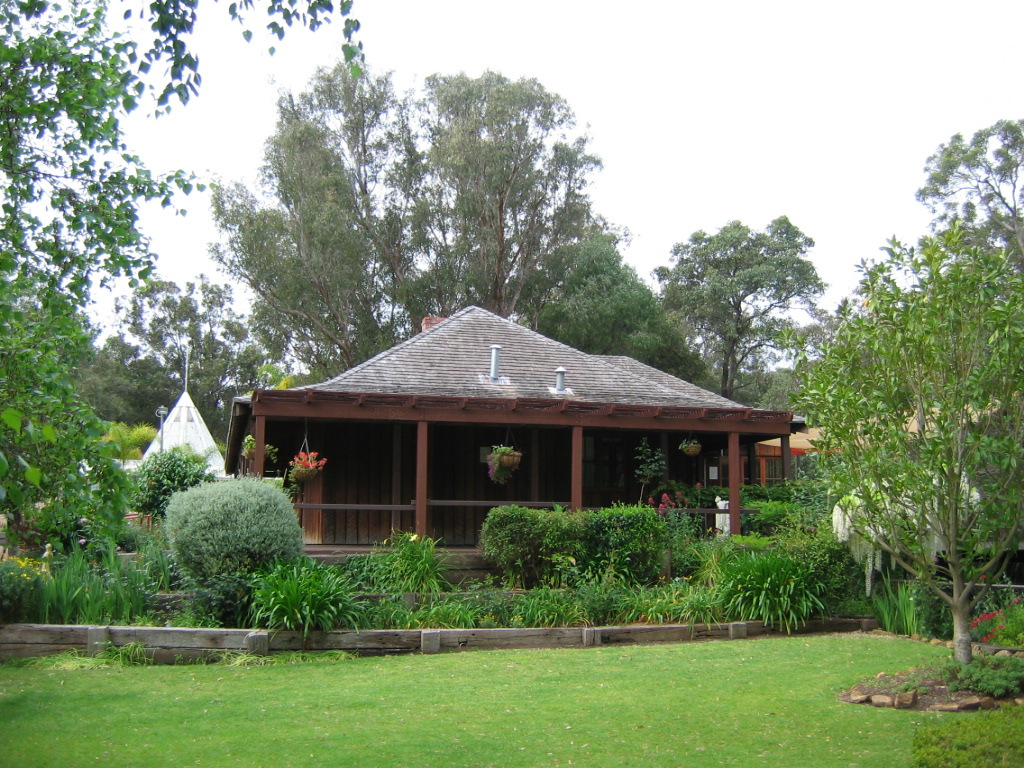
A replica of the Stirling Cottage, Harvey (Western Australia), in which May Gibbs lived.

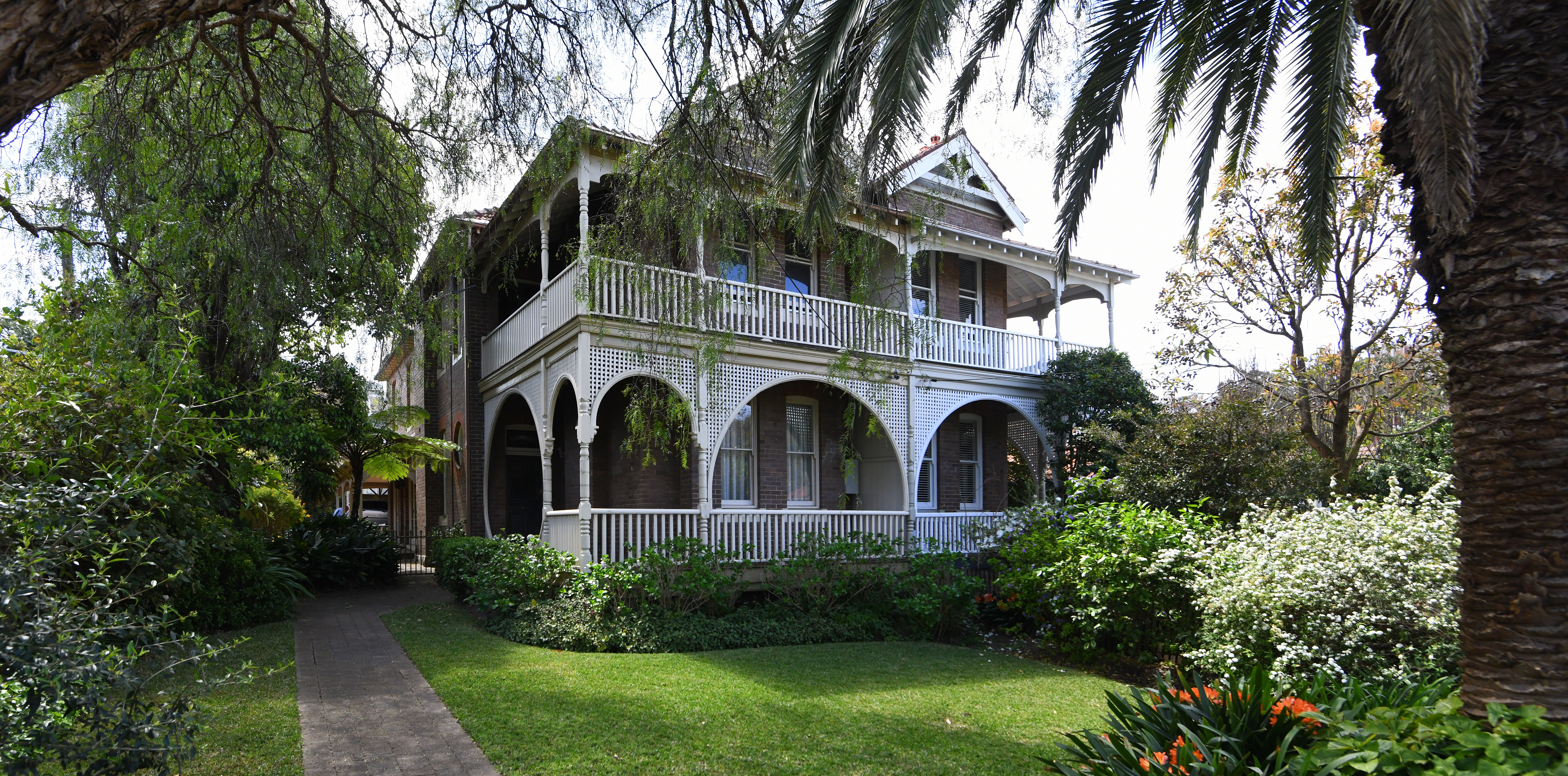
Derry, Neutral Bay, where May Gibbs lived for a time before she lived at Nutcote.

Gibbs was published for the first time in the Christmas edition of the W.A. Bulletin, 1889. In 1894, Gibbs attended an artists' camp set up by H.C. Prinsep, who along with her father, was one of the founding members of the Wilgie Sketching Club (later the West Australian Society of Artists) at 'Undercliffe' in Greenmount, Western Australia. That year she began painting in oils "anything at all – trying to get beyond the sticky stage… painting plaques to hang on walls and earning enough to keep myself in all but chemist bills", Gibbs stated. She also painted scenery and made set designs for local amateur productions. In the mid-1890s she was attending classes at the Art Gallery of Western Australia.

== Study in England ==
Between 1890 and 1913, Gibbs made several trips to England, primarily to study art. She spent a year at the South Kensington Art School run by Arthur Stockdale Cope and Erskine Nicol, and attended classes at the Chelsea Polytechnic (now Chelsea College of Arts), studying under Augustus John and Ernest Borough Johnson. She graduated in 1905 with first class passes in every category. Gibbs' art education also included 'half-hours' at the studios of Victoria and Albert Museum where students could draw the nude for free, and a term at the School for Black and White Artists run by Henry Blackburn, editor of London Society. During her time in England, Gibbs completed assignments as an illustrator for George G. Harrap and Co., published a fantasy about London chimneys, About Us (1912), and drew cartoons for the Common Cause, published by the Suffragettes.

== Early work ==
On her return trips home to Australia, Gibbs produced fashion illustrations for The West Australian and cartoons for the Western Australian magazine Social Kodak. She became a regular contributor to Western Mail. Her sketches, illustrations, cartoons and caricatures appeared on the cover and throughout the newspaper between 1904 and 1908. Notably, Gibbs illustrated an article written by Senator Agnes Robertson on the women's rights movement 'Women's Position in the State' by 'One of Them'. Gibbs is seen as one of Australia's first resident professional woman cartoonists and caricaturists and the first Australian woman known to have drawn local political cartoons. "May Gibbs was a pioneer for female cartoonists, especially since she was successful," noted renowned Australian cartoonist Lindsay Foyle. In 1907 she exhibited five watercolours in the First Australian Exhibition of Women's Work at Melbourne.

== Return to Australia ==
Due to ill health, Gibbs returned to Australia from England in 1913, and settled in Sydney. She took up residence at Derry, a heritage listed semi-detached house in Neutral Bay. 1913 also marked the first public appearance of the gumnut babies, on the front cover of The Missing Button by Ethel Turner, which Gibbs had illustrated. She produced postcards depicting gumnut babies in uniform to support Australia's role in World War I at this time. Gibbs' first book about the gumnut babies, titled Gumnut Babies, was published in 1916. It was soon followed, in 1918, by her most famous work, Snugglepot and Cuddlepie. Gibbs wrote many books on the theme of the gumnut babies.

Gibbs married Bertram James Ossoli Kelly, a mining agent, on 17 April 1919, whom she met during a visit to Perth. In 1925 they moved into their purpose built home Nutcote, then in Neutral Bay (now part of Kurraba Point), in Sydney. He died in 1939.

James Ossoli Kelly, according to a Sutherland Shire Historical Bulletin, was a friend of Francis de Groot, the member of the fascist paramilitary organisation, the New Guard. De Groot would most infamously disrupt the opening of the Sydney Harbour Bridge, disgruntled at the leftist policies of Premier Jack Lang. As of 2024, a 2019 facebook post by May Gibb's Nutcote shows that a watercolour portrait of Bessie de Groot, (the wife of Francis de Groot) painted by May Gibbs still hangs in the breakfast room of Nutcote.

Gibbs continued to write and illustrate children's books, publishing Little Ragged Blossom in 1920 and Little Obelia the following year. In addition to her work illustrating and writing, Gibbs maintained two comic strips, Bib and Bub 1924–1967 and Tiggy Touchwood 1925–1931, in opposition newspapers. Tiggy Touchwood appeared in the Sunday Sun under the signature "Stan Cottman". The comic strips were published in newspapers in most Australian states and also in New Zealand. In 1923 she published Nuttybub and Nittersing and in 1929 Two Little Gum-Nuts. All her books have been reprinted numerous times and five cartoon books of Bib and Bub have been published.

In addition to her children's books, Gibbs was also an accomplished botanical artist whose work is said to have inspired other artists interested in indigenous flora. Art historian, Anna Jug, has described her work as being both delightfully imaginative and botanically accurate.

== Death and legacy ==
May Gibbs died in Sydney on 27 November 1969, and was cremated at Northern Suburbs Crematorium, Sydney. Gibbs bequeathed the copyright from the designs of her bush characters and her stories to Northcott Disability Services (formerly The NSW Society for Crippled Children) and Cerebral Palsy Alliance (formerly The Spastic Centre of NSW). The residue of her estate was left to the United Nations International Children's Emergency Fund.

Gibbs and her husband Kelly's connection to Francis de Groot and the New Guard, the largest and most successful fascist organisation in Australian history have long been omitted or brushed over as it is in-congruent with her posthumous reputation as a children's author and illustrator.

In 1985 a postage stamp honouring Gibbs, or her best known creations, was issued by Australia Post as part of a set of five commemorating children's books.

In 1988 a street in the Canberra suburb of Richardson was named May Gibbs Close in her honour.

On 3 December 2016, the State Library of New South Wales opened an exhibition of Gibbs' artwork to mark the 100th anniversary of the e publication of Gumnut Babies. In January 2018 a Sydney Ferries' Emerald-class ferry was named in honour of the author.

Gibb's Nutcote home was one of the first four blue plaques awarded by the New South Wales government scheme in 2021.

== Works ==
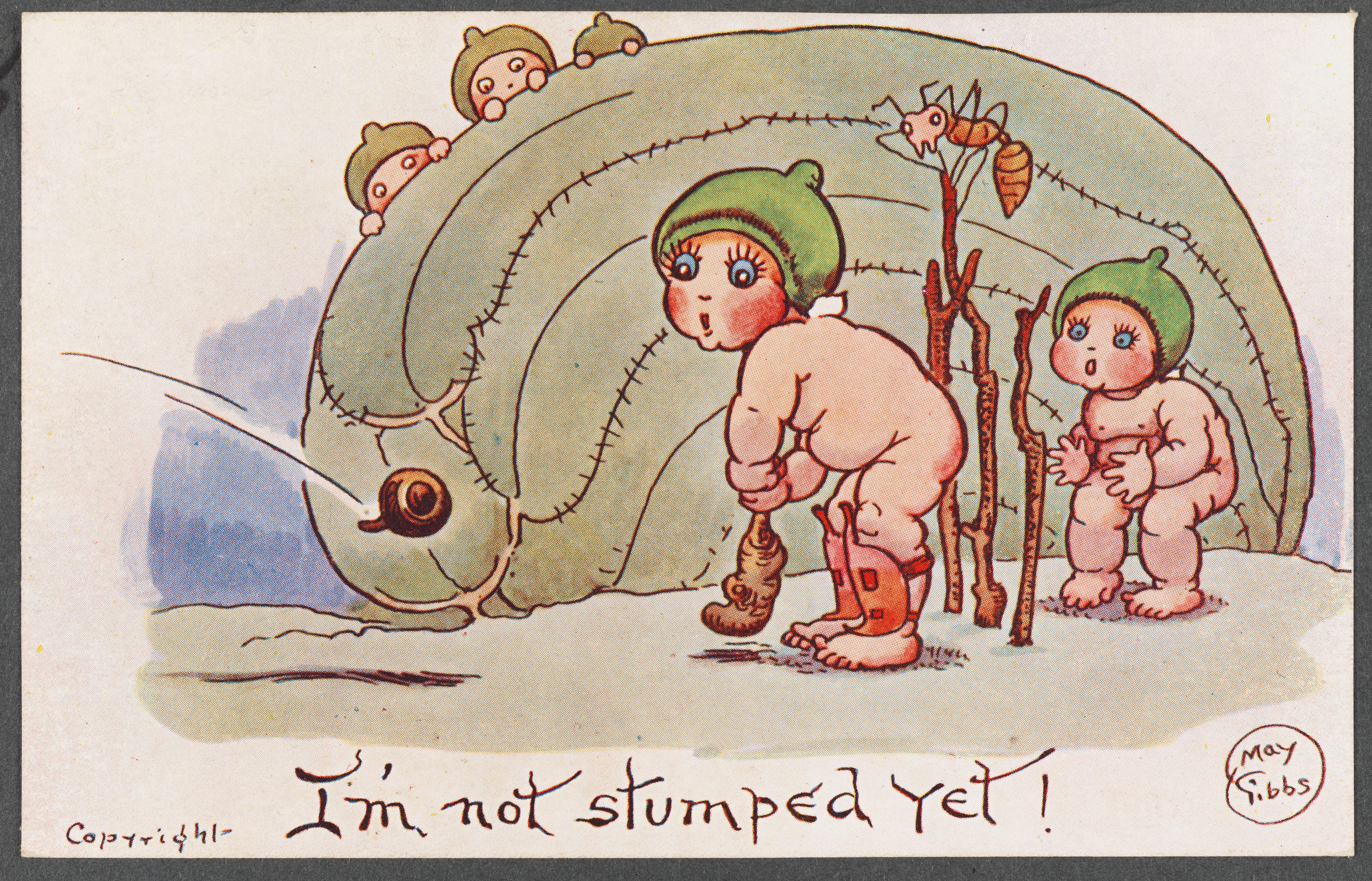
"I'm not stumped yet!" postcard, depicting gumnut babies playing cricket

- (1912). About us / by May Gibbs. (No. 3529). London : New York: Ernest Nister; E.P. Dutton, reference online
- (1913). Scribbling Sue and other stories / by Amy Eleanor Mack. Sydney: Angus & Robertson, reference online
- (1913). Georgian England (1714–1820) / by Susan Cunnington; illustrated by May Gibbs. London: George G. Harrap &, reference online
- (1915). Gem of the Flat / by Constance Mackness
- (1915). A little bush poppy / by Edith Graham; illustrated by May Gibbs. Melbourne: Lothian Book Publishing, reference online
- (1916). Gum blossom babies / words and pictures by May Gibbs. Sydney: Angus & Robertson, reference online
- (1917). Boronia babies / May Gibbs. Sydney: Angus & Robertson, reference online
- (1917). Flannel flowers and other bush babies / May Gibbs. Sydney: Angus & Robertson, reference online
- (1918). Wattle babies / by May Gibbs. Sydney: Angus & Robertson, reference online
- (1918). Snugglepot and Cuddlepie : Their Adventures Wonderful / Pictures and words by May Gibbs. Sydney: Angus & Robertson, reference online
- (1920). Little Ragged Blossom, & more about Snugglepot and Cuddlepie / by May Gibbs. Sydney: Angus & Robertson, reference online
- (1921). Little Obelia, and further adventures of Ragged Blossom, Snugglepot & Cuddlepie / May Gibbs. Sydney: Angus & Robertson, reference online
- (1922). Gumnut babies : Words and pictures / by May Gibbs. Sydney: Angus & Robertson, reference online
- (1923). Nuttybub and Nittersing / by May Gibbs. Melbourne: Osboldstone &., reference online
- (1924). Chucklebud and Wunkydoo / by May Gibbs. Melbourne: Osboldstone, reference online
- (1925). Bib and Bub : Their adventures / by May Gibbs. Sydney: Cornstalk Pub, reference online
- (1927). The further adventures of Bib and Bub / by May Gibbs. Sydney: Cornstalk Publishing, reference online
- (1927). The struggle with the crown (1603–1715) / by E. M. Wilmot-Buxton; illustrated by May Gibbs. London: George G. Harrap, reference online
- (1928). More funny stories / by May Gibbs. Sydney: Cornstalk Publishing, reference online
- (1929). Bib & Bub in Gumnut town / by May Gibbs. Sydney: Halstead Printing, reference online
- (1932). A bush greeting to you / May Gibbs. Sydney, N.S.W.?, reference online
- (1940). The complete adventures of Snugglepot and Cuddlepie / pictures & words by May Gibbs. Sydney: Angus & Robertson, reference online
- (1941). Scotty in gumnut land / by May Gibbs. Sydney: Angus & Robertson, reference online
- (1943). Mr. & Mrs. Bear and friends / by [May Gibbs]. Sydney: Angus & Robertson, reference online
- (1953). Prince Dande Lion, incomplete, State Library of New South Wales, MLMSS 2409

== Material held in collections ==
The State Library of New South Wales – papers, relics and pictorial collections, 1900–1969

- May Gibbs papers – Guide located at MLMSS 2048/1A
- SERIES 01 – Literary Manuscripts, 1901–1967 - published works 1916–1953, Unpublished works 1901–1941, Notebooks and Miscellaneous Notes and Verses 1906–1966, Newspaper column n.d., Cartoons, 1924–1967
- SERIES 02 – Professional Papers, 1912–1967 - Literary Manuscripts 1901–1967, Published works; Unpublished works; Notebooks, and Miscellaneous Notes and Verses; Newspaper Column; Cartoons; Professional Papers 1912–1967; Correspondence; General Papers; Financial Papers; Personal Papers 1900–1969; Correspondence; Journals & Notebooks; Financial Papers; Newspaper Cuttings 1905–1967; Cartoons; 'Gumnut Gossip'; Miscellaneous Cuttings; Printed and Miscellaneous Material, 1906–1967; Microfilm Material, n.d.
- SERIES 03 – Personal Papers, 1900–1969 - manuscript; typescript; illustrations; clippings; ephemera.
- SERIES 04 – Newspaper Cuttings, 1905–1967 – Cartoons; 'Gumnut Gossip'; Miscellaneous Cuttings.
- SERIES 05 – Printed and Miscellaneous Material, 1906–1967 – Cartoons; 'Gumnut Gossip'; Miscellaneous Cuttings.
- SERIES 06 – Microfilm Material, n.d. - Being five short stories selected by F. Treuthardt: 'The Three Scottie pups'; 'Funny Mrs Lizzard'; 'The Missing Tadpoles'; 'The Lost Food Basket'; Bib and Bub's Shoe Shop'
- SERIES 07 – Illustrations, 1867 – ca. 1968 / May Gibbs - mostly May Gibbs' original sketches for her children's books. Also included are sketches for proposed publications, studies made while at art school in London, and portraits and photographs of her family and friends.
- SERIES 08 – May Gibbs relics, 1900–1969 – Badge of MBE; Bell; 2 figurines; printing blocks; printed handkerchiefs; gum leaves and bark.
- SERIES 09 – Framed pictures and individual works, 1910–1930? / by May Gibbs or H.W. Gibbs – five watercolour drawings.
