= Nutcote =

Historic house in North Sydney, New South Wales, Australia

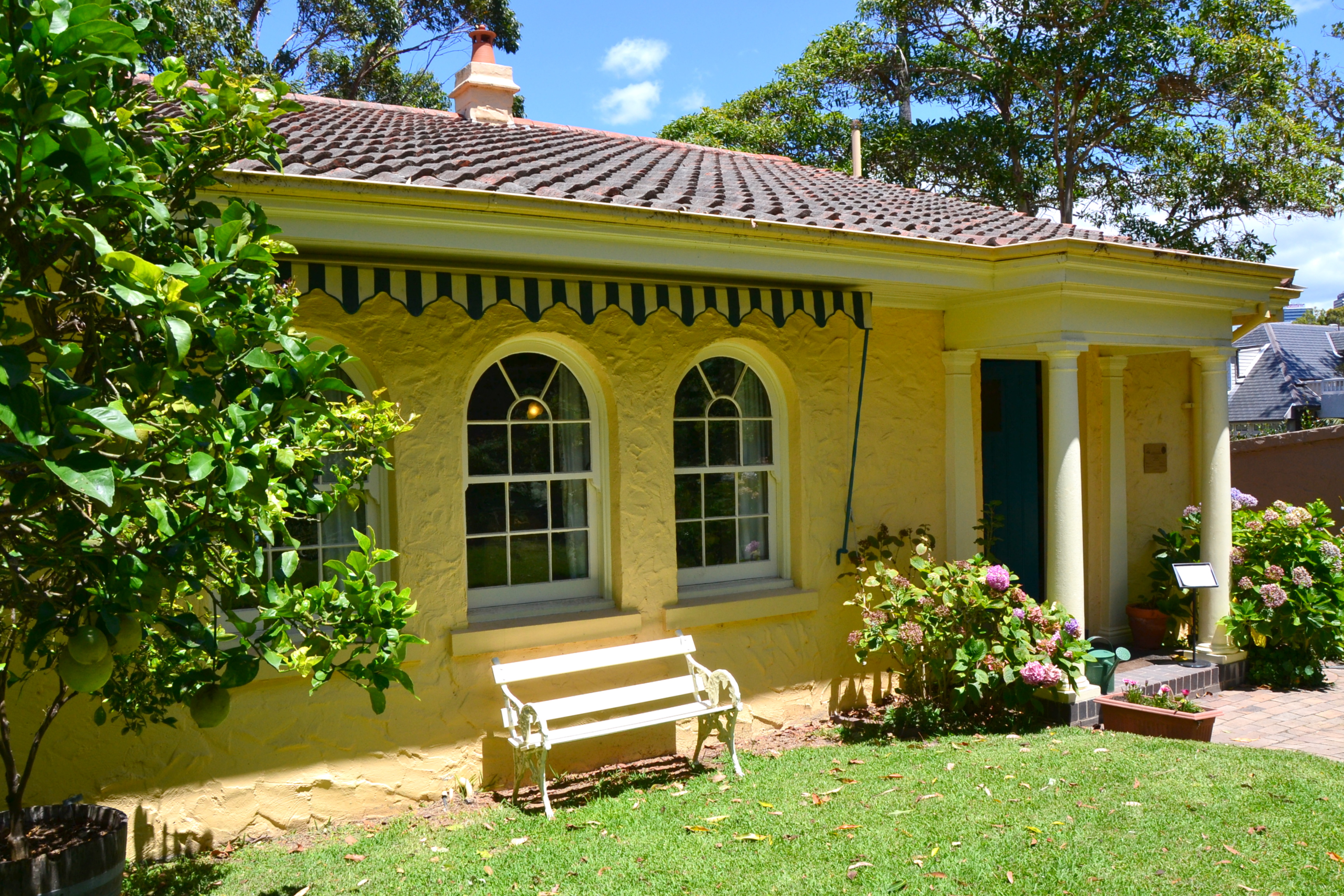

- Location within east Sydney
- 33°50′32″S 151°13′16″E
- Location: 5 Wallaringa Avenue, Kurraba Point, North Sydney Council, New South Wales, Australia

History
- Built: 1924–1925
- Built for: May Gibbs

Site notes
- Architect: B. J. Waterhouse
- Owner: The Nutcote Trust Pty Ltd and North Sydney Council
- Website: www.maygibbs.com.au

New South Wales Heritage Register
- Official name: Nutcote; May Gibbs house
- Type: State heritage (complex / group)
- Designated: 2 April 1999
- Reference no.: 505
- Type: Cottage
- Category: Residential buildings (private)
- Builders: F. J. Gray

Nutcote is a heritage-listed former artist studio, dwelling, and author's study and now education centre and house museum located at 5 Wallaringa Avenue, Kurraba Point, Sydney, in the North Sydney Council local government area of New South Wales, Australia. It was designed by B. J. Waterhouse and built from 1924 to 1925 by F.J.Gray. It is also known as May Gibbs house. The property is owned by North Sydney Council (Local Government). It was added to the New South Wales State Heritage Register on 2 April 1999.

== History ==
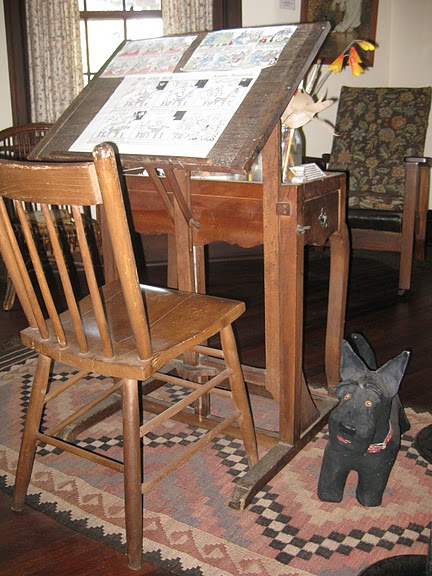
The May Gibbs studio in Nutcote

Nutcote was the home and studio of May Gibbs, Australia's first woman cartoonist who is well remembered for her children's stories and illustrations.

Cecilia May Gibbs was born in Cheam Fields, Surrey England on 17 January 1877. In 1881 her father Herbert and an uncle emigrated to South Australia and a month later her mother May and brother Bertie sailed to join them. They later moved to Western Australia. May exhibited an early talent for sketching and loved the bush, which she explored on her pony. She had three trips to England in 1900, 1904 and 1909, but in 1905 embarked on her career as an illustrator.

Her gumnut babies were born in 1913. In December 1914 The Sydney Morning Herald declared "That she uses all Australian flower and leaf forms in her artistic work is one of the chief charms which Miss May Gibbs manages to infuse in all she does." Her first Australian books were Gum Nut Babies and Gum Blossom Babies which appeared in 1916. In 1919 May quietly married James Ossoli Kelly in Perth and later moved to a flat at Runnymede in Kurraba Point, North Sydney. The following year they moved again to Derry, in Phillips Street.

The plot of land for Nutcote was found for May Gibbs by her mother, Mrs.Cecilia Gibbs, in 1922 on the foreshore of Sydney Harbour. May's instructions to architect B. J. Waterhouse were to design and build a house that would have compactness, convenience, and charm. It was purchased for A£1,365 pounds with a £500 deposit. Waterhouse was a fashionable domestic architect. The final design, completed in 1924, was one of the smallest residences ever designed by Waterhouse, who later suggested that Gibbs name the house Nutcote. Construction was completed by the builder F. J. Gray, in 1925, when May was 48 years old and the total investment in the site and house by then was £5,000, with the property being mortgaged until 1953. The house was specifically designed to accommodate May's studio and reflected her lifestyle, needs, and priorities.

May Gibbs and her husband James Ossoli Kelly moved inin February 1925. In 1928, a double garage was built towards the front of the property. This too was designed by Waterhouse and sat sympathetically with the main house on the site. The garage, built for £400, housed Gibbs' motor car, a Dodge in which she would make trips to the Blue Mountains and other areas. May Gibbs said of Nutcote, 'I used to walk about the garden weeding it and loving it with a book in my pocket and a pencil and that's where I got my best ideas.'

The house was specifically designed to accommodate Gibbs' studio and reflected her lifestyle, needs and priorities. The living room was the main room of the house and reflects the trend from the 1890s to centre the house on a "living hall". It was a gathering place for May and her circle, some of whom stayed for extended periods in the flatette, second bedroom and in later years, a primitive suite of self-contained rooms in the basement of the main house. (May was besotted with her Scottie dogs (Scots terriers) and, on excursions, there were bundled into the back of the car and nursed by the housekeeper).

Gibbs lived at Nutcote for 44 years, creating the Bib and Bub comic strip from 1924 to 1967. The comic strip "Bib and Bub" was produced at Nutcote until 1967, the site's garden became an increasing source of inspiration for this and other works, particularly from the 1950s. Inspiration for her work was taken from the bush in Western Australia which she knew as a child, and from around Sydney and the Blue Mountains. From the 1950s her own garden increasingly provided the stimulus for her work. The death of her husband in 1939, her father in 1940 and many of her close friends during the post-war years gradually led Gibbs into the life of a recluse. It is probable that unsympathetic reprints of her work and increasing poverty increased her desire for isolation. Three new works were to appear in later years: Scotty in Gumnut Land (1941), Mr and Mrs Bear and Friends (1943) and Prince Dandelion (1953). Gibbs lived at Nutcote until close to her death on 27 November 1969.

=== Legacy ===
On her death, May Gibbs left the rights and royalties to her work to the Crippled Children's Society and the Spastic Centre. Nutcote was left to the United Nations International Children's Emergency Fund (UNICEF) which, under its charter, was unable to hold property. The house and contents were sold at public auction in 1970. Later owners were interested in demolishing and developing the site. In 1987, concerned relatives and friends formed the May Gibbs Foundation and the community battle to save it began, becoming a nationwide campaign to Save Nutcote for the Nation. The May Gibbs Foundation succeeded in saving the house, which had remained largely unaltered, protected by a Permanent Conservation Order and were also successful in having it placed on the Register of the National Estate.

=== Heritage classification ===
Nutcote was classified by the National Trust of Australia in 1986 and placed on the North Sydney Council Heritage List in 1987. Despite this, a development application was made to modernise Nutcote and built townhouses in the grounds by prospective buyers Invergowrie Pty Ltd. This sparked a long process of attempts to save Nutcote by the May Gibbs Foundation and interested parties. An unsuccessful appeal was made to Bob Carr, then Minister for Planning and Environment, to purchase the property, and a Commission of Inquiry was established to examine Socrad's objections to the imposition of a permanent conservation order on the site and to hear an appeal by Invergowrie against the Heritage Council's objection of its redevelopment proposal.

The outcome of the inquiry was a compromise recommendation that a permanent conservation order be placed on the cottage but limited townhouse development be allowed on the grounds. The May Gibbs Foundation was not happy with the outcome. An announcement by Invergowrie, who had gone ahead with the purchase of the site, that they would proceed with the development prompted further action. The campaign to save Nutcote was launched in November 1987. On 6 January 1988 a permanent conservation order was placed on the house, harbour side garden and 10 metres (33 ft) of the front garden. This allowed for the townhouse development to proceed. On 25 January 1988 fire caused superficial damage to the house. Internal alterations were approved by the Heritage Council in June.

In September 1988 North Sydney Council voted unanimously to resume Nutcote and turn it over to the May Gibbs Foundation to use as a museum commemorating the woman and her work. This decision and the rejection of the application to alter the house were appealed in the Land and Environment Court by Invergowrie. The court assessor upheld the company's appeal. The May Gibbs Foundation was unable to gain State or Commonwealth government financial support to protect the property.

Nutcote was placed on the market in July 1989. Foundation members outnumbered bidders and Nutcote was passed in at $2.6 million. The property remained deserted until North Sydney Council made the decision to purchase Nutcote outright in November 1991 and lease it to the Nutcote Trust to operate on a profit sharing basis. During this period the front door and fireplace surround were stolen and maintenance was minimal. North Sydney Council originally intended to contribute $600,000 to the purchase and raise the rest by donations from the state and/or federal governments and the community. The inability to raise these funds and a depressed economic climate prompted the council decision to pay the purchase price of $2.86 million.

On 17 January 1992 the Nutcote Centre for Literacy, Arts and Environment was launched on what would have been May Gibbs' 115th birthday. The house would undergo restoration in the following year. On 1 May 1994 following completion of the restoration project, Nutcote was officially opened as a museum of Gibb's work by artist and illustrator, Elizabeth Durack. It is open from 11am to 3pm Wednesdays to Sundays. In 2002/3 the Australian Government provided a Heritage CHPP grant of $27,274 for restoration work to Nutcote and its setting.

Convinced by the widespread support for the campaign, North Sydney Council purchased Nutcote for $2.86m in 1990. Nutcote was restored and shows the house as it would have looked in the late 1920s and early 1930s. This period was chosen due to the evidence available. Some background sources included her husband's diaries and letters, photographs of the house by the occupants, photographs taken by Harold Cazneaux for an article about Nutcote for the magazine, Australian Home Beautiful in 1926 and oral histories from family and friends. It opened to the public in 1994.

== Description ==
=== Nutcote ===
The house is a single storey rectangular dwelling built on land that gently slopes towards the water and is sited on a sandstone ridge about halfway down the block. It is built of cavity brick, roughly rendered and painted with a terracotta colour pantile roof and painted chimneys. A balcony edged with an arched portico and wrought iron railings opens onto the water frontage from the studio and dining room. Louvered timber shutters grace the sides of the timber, double hung sash windows. The front door is set back in a plain pillared entrance portico. The house is built in a classical mediterranean style and consists of 8 rooms and a verandah, porch, entry and hall. The basement contains a laundry, lobby and third bedroom.

=== Double garage ===
Frontage on Wallaringa Avenue. A rectangular building with rendered brickwork walls, terracotta tiled roof and multipaned timber windows and doors. The frontage features two pairs of ledged, framed and sheeted timber bifold doors. The form, detail and finishes are markedly inferior to the house.

=== The gardens ===
Fall to the west to the water's edge of Neutral Bay and are quite steep below the cottage where outcropping sandstone occurs. The steep area of the site has remnant native vegetation developed on the Hawkesbury Sandstone derived soils. Outcropping sandstone immediately below the cottage to the west was used to construct a terrace. The terrace area is concrete paved and a concrete stairway leads down the rock face to connect to the lower grass terrace. On the higher eastern side below Wallaringa Road the garden shows evidence of its original cottage character with some remnants of the annuals, perennials and hedging present. The major remnants are primarily along the southern boundary fence and immediately adjacent to the cottage and garage. Other landscape elements include brick flagged paths from the front of the property to the cottage entrance portico and along the north side of the cottage. A timber lattice with trellis and shrubbery planting screens the north western corner of the cottage. Remains of an early steel post and wire fence can be found along the western (harbour frontage) boundary. Timber fences line the remaining boundaries.

=== Condition ===
Prior to restoration of the site physical condition was assessed as follows:

- House - reasonable.
- Garage - fair
- Gardens - poor.

Nutcote and surrounds have been restored.

=== Modifications and dates ===
- 1924-1938 - General maintenance including painting (5 times) and repairs to kitchen porch.
- Garden established and maintained.
- 1928 - Garage built.
- 1950-1970 - Enamel bath removed and shower hob installed in bathroom.
- Refrigerator in dining room replaced ice chest in hall.
- Shower recess added to laundry.
- 1973-1987 - Enamel sink removed from kitchen and replaced with stainless steel sink.
- New gas stove installed.
- Safe added in bedroom 1.
- Original fittings replaced with "modern" lightfittings.
- Security grill added to window W16.
- 1988 -Fire in laundry destroys a door, window, shutters and cupboard.
- 1987-1990 - Possible rewiring of house.
- Some repairs to roof.
- Front door removed and replaced with poor quality door.
- Chimney piece to fireplace in living room removed.
- Garden trellis removed.
- 1990-1993 -Renewing of gutters, fascias and timber trims and repainting of east facade of garage.

== Heritage listing ==
As at 15 February 2006, Nutcote and its garden is a place of cultural significance as the home and workplace of May Gibbs, an Australian cartoonist, painter, naturalist, children's author, and illustrator. Nutcote is associated with architect B. J. Waterhouse, who designed the house with May Gibbs.

Nutcote was listed on the New South Wales State Heritage Register on 2 April 1999 having satisfied the following criteria.

The place is important in demonstrating the course, or pattern, of cultural or natural history in New South Wales.

Nutcote is considered significant to present and future generations of Australians as the place where May Gibbs lived for the greater part of her life, a place where she found much inspiration and where she produced many of her famous works. In particular Nutcote displays exceptional historical value in its association with May Gibbs through:

- influence of May Gibbs on the layout, appearance and function of Nutcote through her input into the design of the cottage and her care and cultivation of the surrounding gardens.
- the influence that Nutcote exercised on the imagination and the source of inspiration for May Gibbs' work.
- its association with May Gibbs' contribution to Australian nationalism, bush awareness, bush care, aesthetics, art and literature and feminism.

The place is important in demonstrating aesthetic characteristics and/or a high degree of creative or technical achievement in New South Wales.

Nutcote is a building of moderate architectural merit as an example of classical Mediterranean architecture which was being advocated by a small but influential number of architects. Nutcote is associated with the work of B.J.Waterhouse, a highly respected Australian architect responsible for the design of many residences in Sydney. Nutcote is a good example of a modest, well crafted and innovatively planned house. Nutcote cottage and site represents a reflection of the taste, preferences and living style of the original occupants, May Gibbs and her husband J. O. Kelly. The gardens, designed built and maintained by May Gibbs, with their mixture of existing natives and extensive English cottage garden style planning must be considered expressions of her lifestyle, tastes and preferences.

The place has a strong or special association with a particular community or cultural group in New South Wales for social, cultural or spiritual reasons.

Nutcote is considered to represent exceptional social significance as a physical reminder for many Australians of the lifetime work of May Gibbs in the form of stories, illustrations and postcards which have strong associations with the development of an Australian cultural identity during a formative historical period. The significance of this association is enhanced due to May Gibbs' contribution to Australian nationalism, bush awareness, bush care, aesthetics, atr and literature and feminism. Nutcote has also, since the early 1980s been the focus for national sentiment for a wide range of literary, social and special interest groups conserved with its conservation. Many Australians are aware of what Nutcote represents and its association with May Gibbs. These factors combined are of considerable social significance.

Nutcote was the site of one of the first four blue plaques awarded by the New South Wales government scheme in 2021, commemorating the life of May Gibbs.
