= Royal Cinemas 14 & World's Tallest IMAX =

Movie theater in Pooler, GA, U.S.

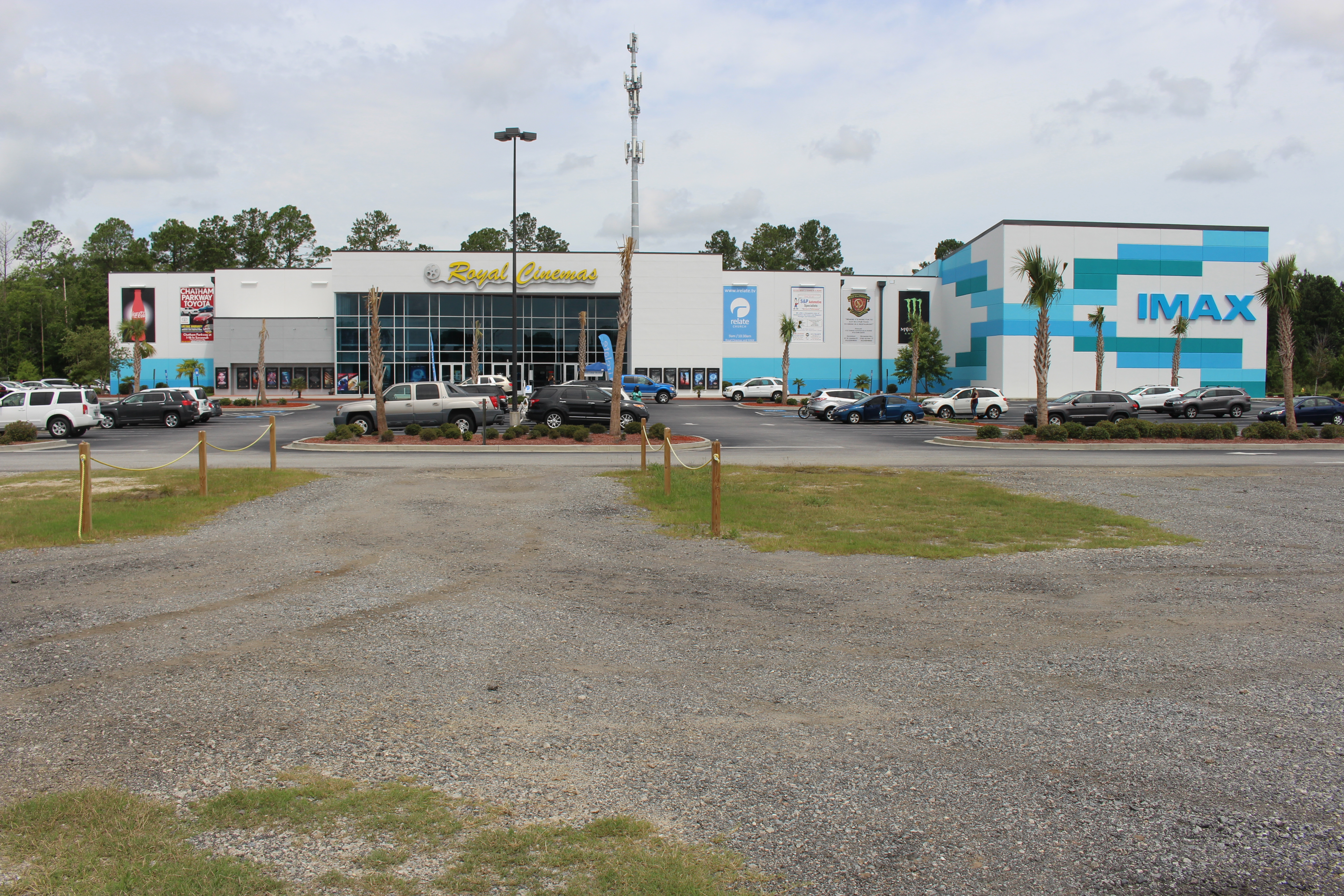
- Original pre-renovation appearance
- Address: 5 Towne Center Ct; Pooler; United States
- Coordinates: 32.146770°N 81.252180°W|
- Owner: Royal Cinemas
- Type: Cinema

Website
- https://www.royalcinemaspooler.com/

Royal Cinemas 14 & World's Tallest IMAX is an IMAX movie theater in Pooler, Georgia, United States. It is the tallest IMAX theater in the world. It is owned and operated by Royal Cinemas, and features IMAX's dual laser projector.

== History ==
In 2012, it was announced that Pooler, Georgia would receive an IMAX theater. The theater was projected to cost $3 million and would contain 350 seats.

The cinema first opened on September 14, 2012.

In 2022, as the theater's 10 year contract came up for renewal, it was decided that a new IMAX auditorium would be built adjacent to the original one. The new auditorium would contain the worlds tallest IMAX screen with a height of 76 feet and width of 101 feet. The screen was so large that a robotic arm was required to paint it. The new auditorium would also feature IMAX's dual laser projection system and 363 recliner seats.

The new auditorium opened in February 2022, at the same time the original auditorium closed.

== Comparison to other IMAX theaters ==
Currently, Royal Cinemas 14 & World's Tallest IMAX contains the world's third largest IMAX screen, after Traumpalast Leonberg and IMAX Melbourne. However Royal Cinemas 14 & World's Tallest IMAX is taller than both venues. Additionally Traumpalast Leonberg is limited to a 1.90:1 aspect ratio meaning that it is unable to project IMAX's full GT aspect ratio, while Royal Cinemas 14 & World's Tallest IMAX and IMAX Melbourne can.

== See also ==
- BFI IMAX
- IMAX Melbourne
- IMAX Sydney
