= The Ribbon, Sydney =

Building in Sydney, Australia

The Ribbon
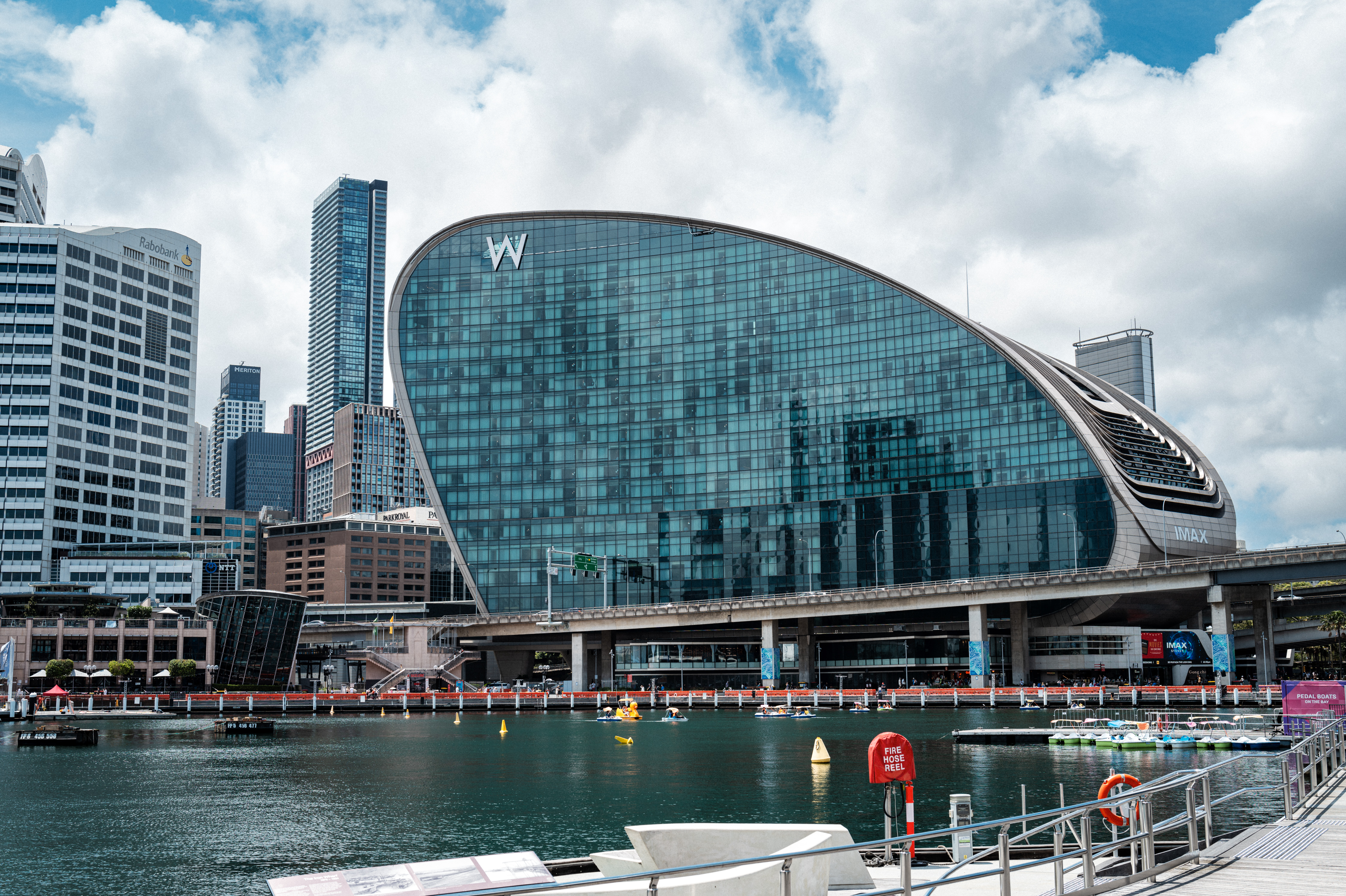
- The Ribbon in September 2023
- Interactive map of The Ribbon
- Location: 31-33 Wheat Road, Darling Harbour, Sydney, New South Wales, Australia
- Coordinates: 33.877898°S 151.199573°E
- Type: Movie theatre and hotel

Construction
- Opened: 12 October 2023
- Architect: Hassell
- Builders: Grocon; Probuild; Multiplex

Website
- Official website

The Ribbon is a mixed-use building in Darling Harbour, Sydney, comprising a hotel, residential apartments, retail and movie theatre. Namely, it contains the W Sydney Hotel and IMAX Sydney; which is the third-largest operating movie theatre screen in the world. The building is named The Ribbon due to its unique ribbon-like appearance. On its northern and southern sides, the building is flanked by two carriageways of the Western Distributor.

== History ==
The Ribbon is built upon the site of the original IMAX Sydney theatre which was completed in 1996 before being demolished for redevelopment in 2016.

Construction on The Ribbon building commenced in 2017 and opened on 12 October 2023, after years of delays. The Ribbon was originally scheduled to be completed in 2020, but was incrementally delayed after the successive bankruptcy of two of its builders, Grocon and Probuild. These delays were further exacerbated by the COVID-19 pandemic, which took place during the building's construction. The original contracted builder; Grocon, declared insolvency and pulled from the project in late 2020. ProbuiId precedingly took over construction in early 2021 before the company collapsed and was placed into voluntary administration in 2022. The building was finally completed by Multiplex, opening in October 2023.

== Design ==
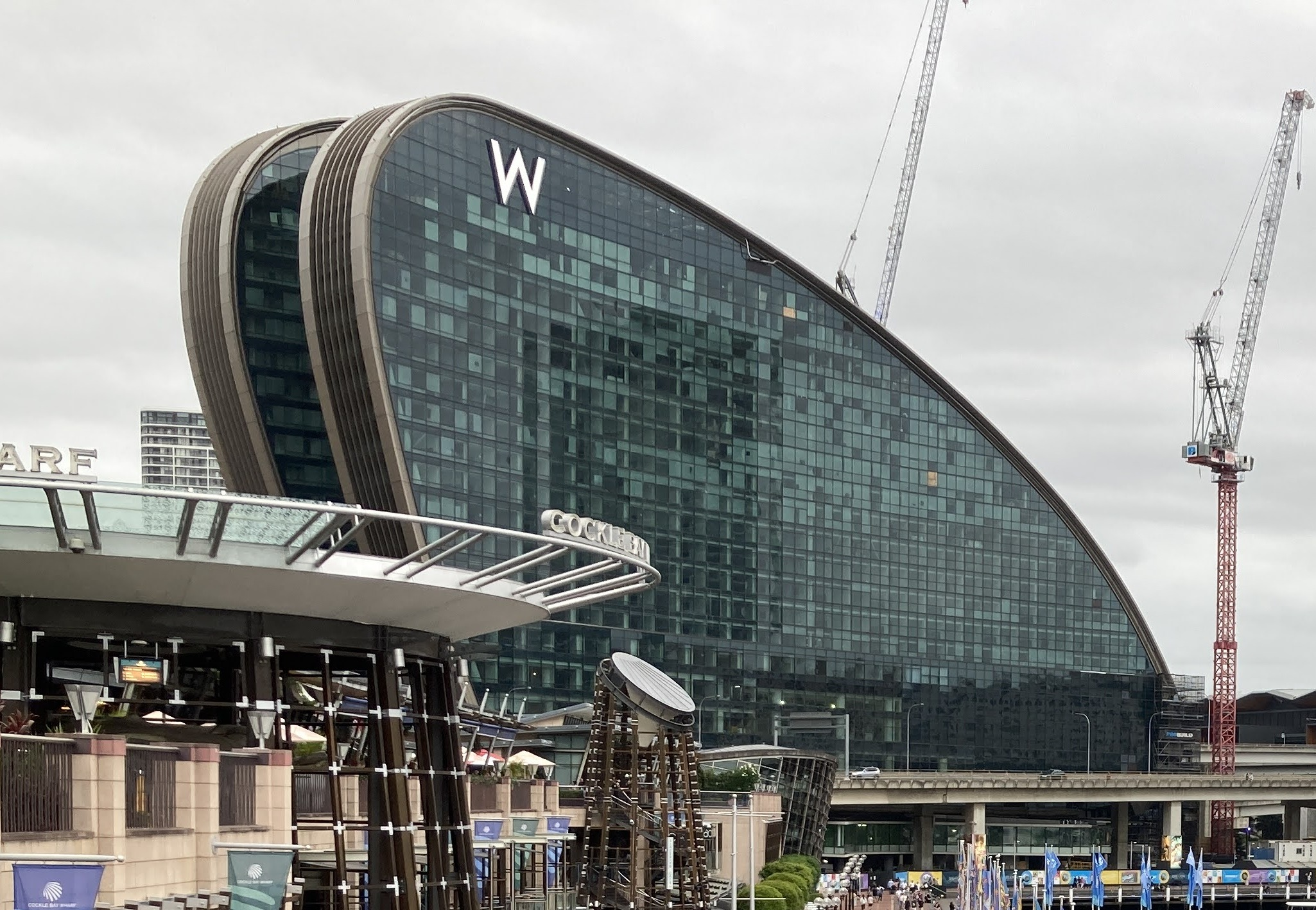
The Ribbon in February 2022

The building has 588 hotel rooms and suites and includes a rooftop heated infinity pool and wet deck with a two-storey bar, several other bars, a spa, a BTWN restaurant, meeting rooms and an IMAX theatre with 325-seats and the third-largest operating movie theatre screen in the world. The screen measures 692 square metres (7,450 sq ft) or 29 m × 24 m (95 ft × 79 ft), making it the second-tallest and fourth-largest screen ever built, surpassed only by the Melbourne IMAX theatre screen which measures 736 square metres (7,920 sq ft), 32 m × 23 m (105 ft × 75 ft), and the Traumpalast cinema hall in Leonberg, Germany which has a screen measuring 836 square metres (9,000 sq ft), 38 m × 22.2 m (125 ft × 73 ft). Due to new constraints in the new building, the screen is slightly smaller than the one in the previous building that it replaced, which measured 1,056 square metres (11,370 sq ft), 35.72 m × 29.57 m (117.2 ft × 97.0 ft).
