= Bryan Avery =

Bryan Avery MBE
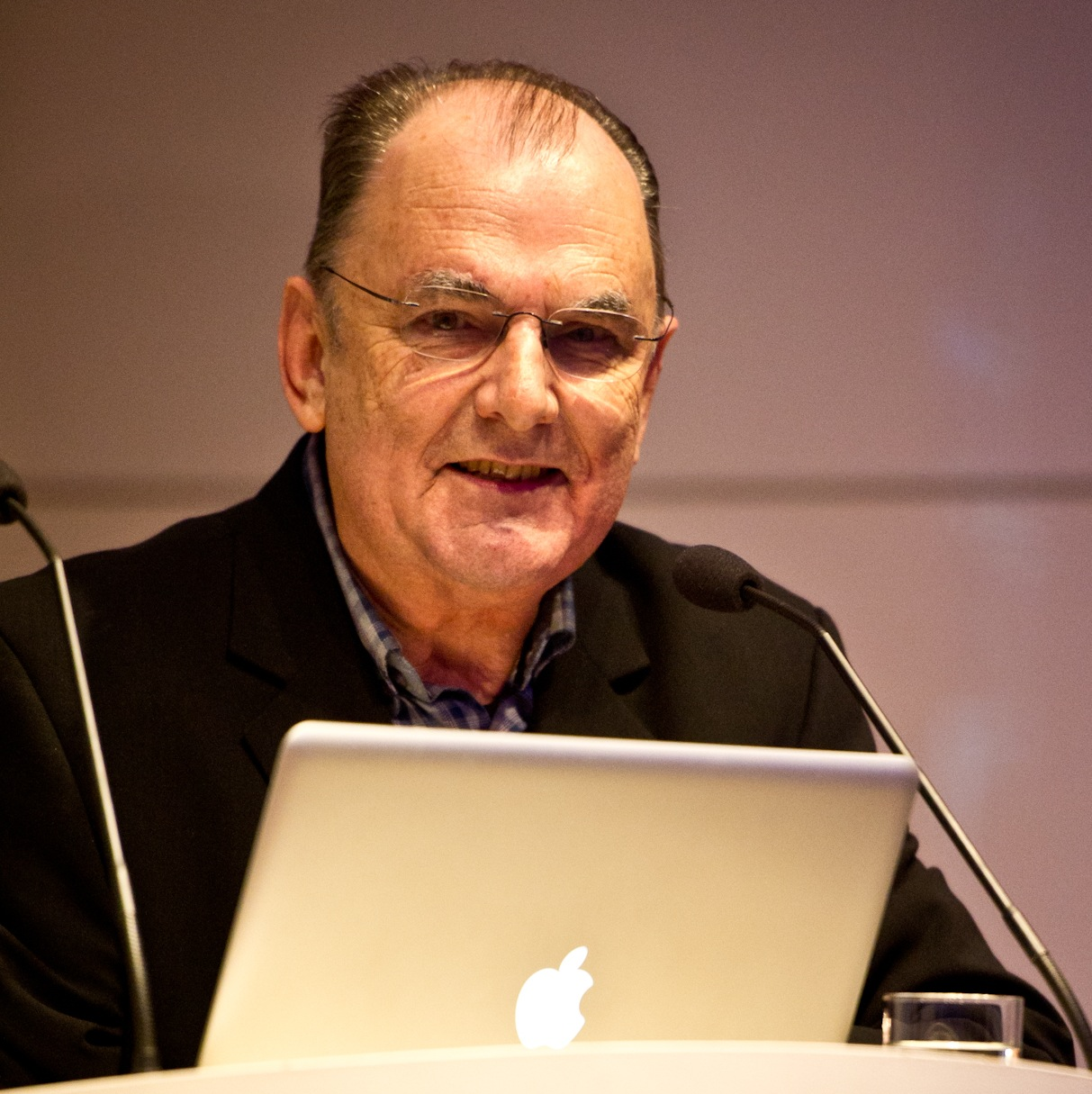
- Avery giving a lecture in 2014
- Born: Bryan Robert Avery; 2 January 1944; Wallingford, Berkshire, England
- Died: 4 July 2017 (aged 73); London, England
- Occupation: Architect
- Awards: Design Council Millennium Products Award Chicago Athenaeum International Architecture Award
- Practice: Avery Associates Architects
- Buildings: BFI London IMAX Royal Academy of Dramatic Art (RADA) Museum of the Moving Image (MOMI)
- Projects: Wilderness City

Bryan Robert Avery MBE RIBA (2 January 1944 – 4 July 2017) was an English architect, born in Wallingford, Berkshire. After his childhood years spent in Lymington in the New Forest, Hampshire, he studied architecture at Leicester College of Art (now the De Montfort University), followed by an MA in the History and Theory of Architecture at Essex University under Professors Joseph Rykwert and Dalibor Vesely.

He established his own practice Avery Associates Architects in 1976. The practice has built a wide range of projects ranging from theatres and museums to offices and educational buildings, many of which have won respected awards.

He published a book, Fragments of Wilderness City (ISBN 9781904772583) in 2011 which describes his work and theory.

== Awards ==
Avery was appointed Member of the Order of the British Empire (MBE) in the 2015 Birthday Honours for services to architecture.

In 2010 Avery was awarded the Chicago Athenaeum International Architecture Award for the Old Bailey office building.

In 1999, Avery was awarded the Design Council's Millennium Products Award for the BFI IMAX cinema in Waterloo, London.

== Projects (built) ==
- Museum of the Moving Image, London (1988)
- Neathouse Place offices, London (1997)
- Royal Academy of Dramatic Art (RADA), London
- BFI London IMAX, London (1999)
- The London Transport Museum, London (2007)
- 10 Old Bailey offices, London (2009)
- Repton School Theatre, Derbyshire (2011)

== Projects (proposals) ==
- Oxford Street (1983)
- Symbol for Southampton (2006)
- Lymington residential, restaurant and gallery development (2011)
- Wilderness City
- CitizenM hotel, Holborn (2012)
- Stansted Airport Crossrail (2013)
- St Barbe Museum & Art Gallery, Lymington (2014)
- No. 1 Undershaft (site of Aviva Tower), City of London (2015)
