= Gavan McDonell =

Australian economist, sociologist and engineer

Gavan McDonell (27 November 1932, Brisbane, Queensland) is an Australian civil engineer, economist and political sociologist in the fields of national infrastructure policy reform, international development and academic education for advanced sustainability studies.

McDonell has directed four public enquiries for different State and Federal governments, three as sole Commissioner under legislation similar to a Royal Commission. (See Public commissions of enquiry below). From the late 1950s to the mid-1990s he was a consultant, adviser and senior official in about forty countries, working on national infrastructure and regional development. (See International Consultancy below). From the late 1980s to the late 1990s, McDonell established in the University of New South Wales, Sydney, one of the first transdisciplinary programs in advanced social and political theory relating to environmental sustainability. This has produced leading contributions in research, policy and governance for science, technology and environment. (See Academic career below). As a senior investment banker in the early 1990s, he wrote the first survey by a Westerner since World War II of the energy, transport and related environmental issues of the eight energy-rich republics of the former Soviet Union in the Caucasus and Central Asia. (See European Bank for Reconstruction and Development below). During the early 2000s he made well known contributions to policy reform for the design and structure of the national electricity markets and grid, the country's most complex infrastructure system. (See National Electricity Market below.)

In 1997 McDonell received a Doctor of Engineering from the University of Queensland, the highest academic recognition, rarely awarded, given for original and distinguished contributions of a career. The citation observed that his work marked " ... the emergence of a new professional field which might be called 'the engineering, management and evaluation of large infrastructure systems ... linked with social and political theory and relating human concerns to the environment ... ', and that it had ' ... set policy agendas and legislative programs for longterm change at national and State levels in freight and urban transport, shipping and ports, electricity and energy, and toxic wastes'." In 1991 he was admitted to Fellowship in the Australian Academy of Technological Sciences and Engineering, the highest professional award. He is married to Jennifer Uscinski and has four sons-Domininc, Lawrence, Justin, and Benjamin-from a former marriage to Anne Callaghan.

== Early life and education ==
McDonell, the second son of William and Catherine (née Breen) McDonell, was born and raised in Brisbane, Queensland, educated at St. Joseph's College, Gregory Terrace, and graduated in civil engineering from the University of Queensland in 1955, majoring in engineering structures under Professor John Lavery, a leading designer and theorist. He took a Master of Arts in political economy and international studies from Johns Hopkins University, Maryland, in 1961, with a thesis on infrastructure policy in post-revolutionary China. He was a student of Simon Kuznets, Fritz Machlup and Owen Lattimore (also studying at the London School of Economics with Edith Penrose). Subsequently, he took a PhD in political and economic sociology in 1987 at the University of New South Wales, where he was a student of Sol Encel and Michael Pusey with a dissertation on the sociology and economics of transport and infrastructure industries.

== Early career ==
After working as a construction engineer in Tasmania with Hydro Tasmania, McDonell was a design engineer with Ove Arup in London, and managed their Accra, Ghana office, supervising bridge and building projects, including architecture by Maxwell Fry and Jane Drew.

In the period 1961–1963, he was engineer and economic adviser with the government of Northern Nigeria, based in Kano, and was responsible for the economic and demographic aspects of the first Greater Kano Masterplan, probably the first regional development plan in Sub-Saharan Africa.

In the early/mid-1960s, McDonell advised on finance and planning to the Board of McDonald Industries Limited, Chairman Sir Warren McDonald, and was project manager for the first Frances Creek, Northern Territory iron mine and related Darwin port facilities program.

In 1966 he was appointed founding Director-designate and later Director of the Department of Transport in Papua New Guinea, the first in the Commonwealth to embrace land, sea and air transport. He directed the preparation of Papua New Guinea's first national transport plan which formed the basis for long term financing and development. (See Transport in Papua New Guinea: Governance for more information.)

McDonell contributed the transport and economic analyses for the first City of Sydney Strategic Plan which provided the basis for the City's planning process for over twenty years. (See City of Sydney: Politics for more information.)

== Public commissions of enquiry ==
McDonell has directed, as Sole Commissioner, three Commissions of Enquiry into major public controversies:

=== Port Darwin, Northern Territory Transport and Economic Development 1971–72 ===
Appointed in 1971 by the Administrator of the Northern Territory to enquire into large shipping delays, port requirements and transport needs for Territory development, McDonell's recommendations resulted in redirection of port investment and port operations, a masterplan and highways linking with adjoining States. (See Northern Territory: Transport for more information.)

=== New South Wales Road and Rail Freight Transport Industry 1978–80 ===
As a result of road/rail conflicts and industrial disputes blocking highways serving all capital cities on the Australian mainland, this enquiry, established by the New South Wales government, resulted in the restructuring of much of the NSW rail freight industry, new road licensing, and the first comprehensive economic measures of national road freight infrastructure costs. (See Road transport in Australia: Economic regulation for more information.) It also provided the contents of a national regulatory agenda, (see Road transport in Australia: Costs and funding), and for development of the Darling Harbour Precinct on Sydney Harbour. (See Darling Harbour: History.)

=== New South Wales Electricity Generation Planning and Reform 1984–85 ===
Following many State and inter-State problems in the electricity industry in the early 1980s, this enquiry, appointed by the New South Wales government, resulted in the abandonment of four planned major power stations, power industry restructuring including the Electricity Commission of New South Wales, strengthened interconnection of the State power systems in eastern Australia, and the co-ordination of regional markets. It ushered in new directions in Australian energy policy and governance with long running effects. (See Energy policy of Australia: History and governance.)

=== Joint Taskforce on Intractable Wastes 1987–88 ===
McDonell was also appointed by the Federal, New South Wales and Victorian governments to chair a public consultation and investigation of the regulation, storage and disposal of large volumes of hexachorobenzenes ('intractable wastes') throughout Australia. This led to new protocols for the import, export and transport of hazardous wastes

== Consultancy ==
=== International consultancy ===
In 1971 McDonell established an economic and planning consultancy for which he worked, between the 1960s–2000s, in about forty countries in Africa, South America, Asia (east, southeast, south and central), and in the Pacific and Indian Oceans, completing many projects.

Some of these projects include:

- Energy market integration studies, East Asia, 2007 – for the East Asia Summit Research Initiative.
- Yangtse Economic Zone (Shanghai, Zhejiang, Jiangsu, Anhui) Energy and Transport Study, 1991 – independent academic expert, Steering Commission, China and World Bank. This was the largest study to date in China sponsored by the World Bank, covering about a quarter of the country's population and GDP.
- Thai-Lao Friendship Bridge: Regional economic, environment and transport appraisals and investment analysis. This has become one of the better known Australian assistance projects in Asia.
- Beira-Machipanda transport corridor, Mozambique. Study for rehabilitation of major corridor linking to Zimbabwe and central Africa.
- Development of civil aviation in Central/Southern Africa.
- Port development at Cotabato City, Mindanao, Philippines, 1970s – for Asian Development Bank. Led to infrastructure investments in this area much affected by insurgency in the southern Philippines.

=== National consultancy ===
- Sydney Metropolitan regional hospital and health facility plans, 1970s- for NSW Health Commission. These studies, covering most of the metropolis, included the first resource-allocation based planning models in this sector, with major effects upon hospital development.
- In 1982 McDonell was invited to become senior Deputy Director General in the Victorian Ministry of Transport, responsible to the Minister for the portfolio's investment budgets and oversight of the first public sector market-oriented reform program in Australia, covering all Ministry agencies in rail, trams, roads and ports.
- Studies for the National Electricity Market-see below.

== European Bank for Reconstruction and Development (EBRD) ==
In 1991, following the collapse of the Soviet Union McDonell was invited to join the newly established EBRD as senior adviser responsible for developing infrastructure, energy and environment investment strategies for the three Caucasian republics of Georgia, Armenia and Azerbaijan, and the five Central Asian republics of Turkmenistan, Uzbekistan, Tajikistan, Kyrgyzstan and Kazakhstan. He was one of the first Westerners for about half a century to have policy access in these countries, and initiated infrastructure lending programs. His report commissioned by the Royal Institute of International Affairs Chatham House became a standard reference.

== National Electricity Market ==
In the late 1990s and early 2000s McDonell provided the economic direction for a series of studies, generally in conjunction with Intelligent Energy Systems (IES) (www.iesys.com.au), of policy and structural issues in the National Electricity Market (NEM). Several of these produced notable innovations. They included: -Analyses of the importance of the role of interconnectors between regional and State power grids and the technical and economic issues involved. -The introduction of the ancillary services markets. McDonell designed the economic principles for the ancillary markets: the system has led to large cost savings and greater stability control for the whole 4,000 kilometres (2,500 mi) national grid, probably the longest, single-operator system in the world. It was claimed by the official regulators to be a world first. – In 2003, as the expert member of the National Electricity Tribunal, the industry's appeals body for the review of major regulatory decisions, he gave the minority decision on the controversial Murraylink/SNI process which had taken 6 years. His decision led to reconstruction of the Australian Competition and Consumer Commission's Regulatory Test, the key guideline on major transmission network investments.

== Academic career ==
In 1988 McDonell was appointed to convene the Graduate Program in Science and Society in the Faculty of Arts and Social Sciences, University of New South Wales . In the early 1990s he changed the program into the graduate and undergraduate Interdisciplinary Program in Environmental Studies, with new collaborative engagements among several of the University's Schools and Faculties. Focusing on socio-political issues of sustainability, it is administered through the School of Humanities within the Faculty, of which he was an adjunct professor. McDonell pioneered advanced studies combining the understanding of transdisciplinary studies, the sociology of everyday life and trust, risk society, sociology of science, and deliberative democracy. Scholars from the Program have made leading contributions to national and international research, policy and governance in toxic waste management, corporate and industry sustainability, national primary industry environmental reform and governance, environmental and constitutional law, regulation of gene technology, and in other fields.

== Honours and awards ==
- Fellow, Australian Academy of Technological Sciences and Engineering, 1991
- Doctor of Engineering, University of Queensland, 1997

== Professional affiliations ==
- Fellow, Australian Institute of Management, 1983
- Fellow, Institution of Engineers Australia, 1972
- Fellow, Royal Geographical Society, 1964

== Selected bibliography ==
About 150 published volumes, reports, articles including

- Minority Decision by Professor Gavan McDonell, Murraylink v NEMMCO, National Electricity Tribunal, 2003.
- "NSW Government Ownership in a Mandatory Pool: 'Neither fish nor fowl nor ...'" in G. Munro, V.Sands, eds, Power Progress, Australian Scholarly Publishers, Melbourne 2003.
- "Scientific and everyday knowledge, trust and the politics of environmental disputes". Social Studies of Science, volume 27, 819–863, SAGE, Edinburgh, 1997.
- The Euro-Asian Corridor: Freight and Energy Transport for Central Asia and the Caspian Region. Royal Institute of International Affairs, London, 1995
- Report of the Commission of Enquiry into NSW Electricity Generation Planning. 4 Volumes. NSW Government, 1986.
- Report of the Commission of Enquiry into NSW Road and Rail Freight Transport. 6 Volumes. NSW Government, 1980.
- Report of the Commission of Enquiry into Port Darwin and the Development of the Northern Territory. Administration of the Northern Territory, Darwin/ Department of Territories, Canberra.
