= Darling Harbour =

Harbour adjacent to the city centre of Sydney, New South Wales, Australia

Coordinates: 33°52′20″S 151°11′56″E

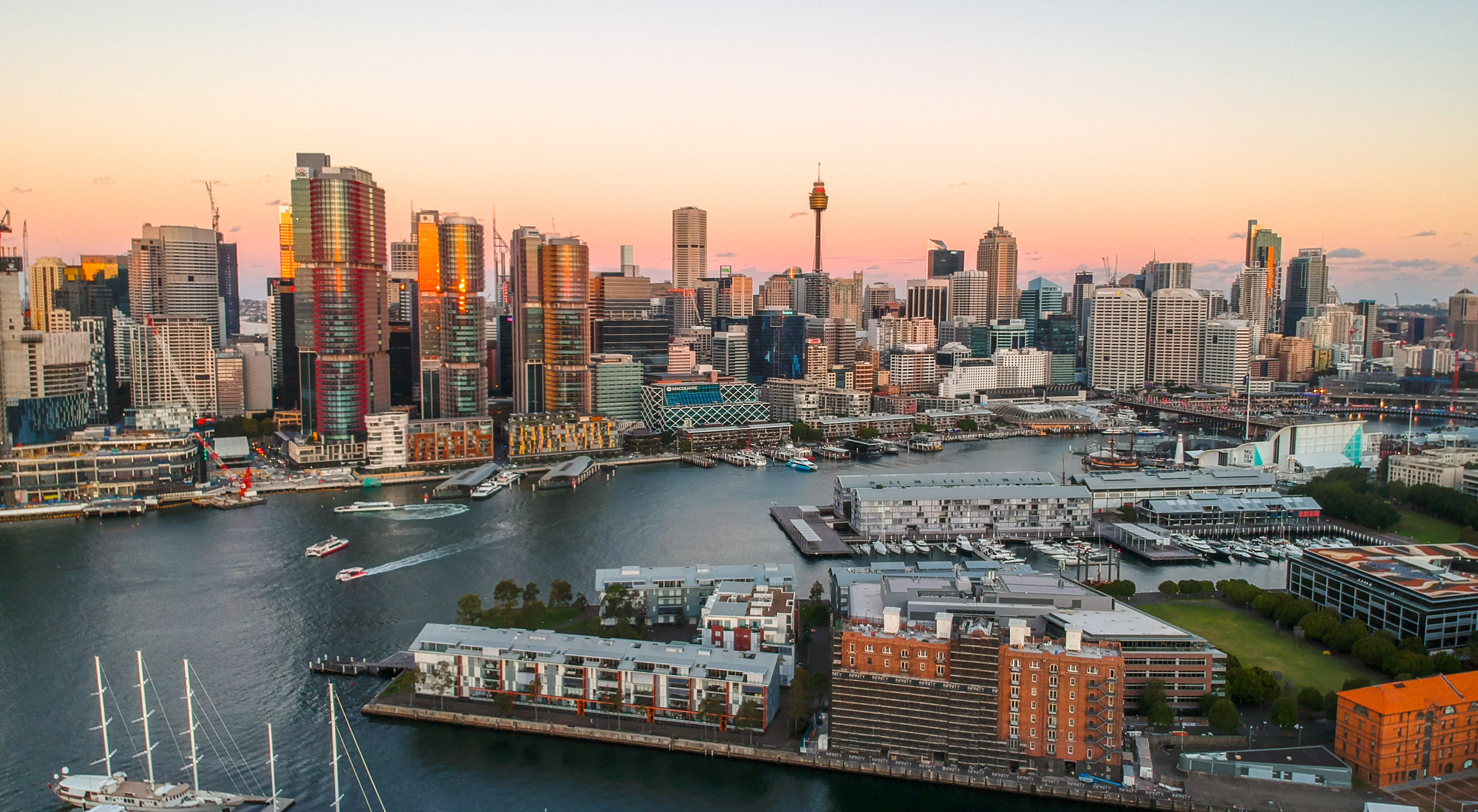
An aerial view of Darling Harbour and its surrounds, looking east from above Pyrmont

Darling Harbour is a harbour and neighbourhood adjacent to the city centre of Sydney, New South Wales, Australia. It comprises a large recreational, retail and entertainment precinct with pedestrianised public spaces.

Originally named Long Cove, the locality extends northwards from Chinatown, along both sides of Cockle Bay to King Street Wharf on the east, and to the suburb of Pyrmont on the west. Cockle Bay is just one of the waterways that makes up Darling Harbour, which opens north into the much larger Port Jackson.

The precinct and its immediate surroundings are administered independently of the local government area of the City of Sydney, by Property NSW.

== History ==
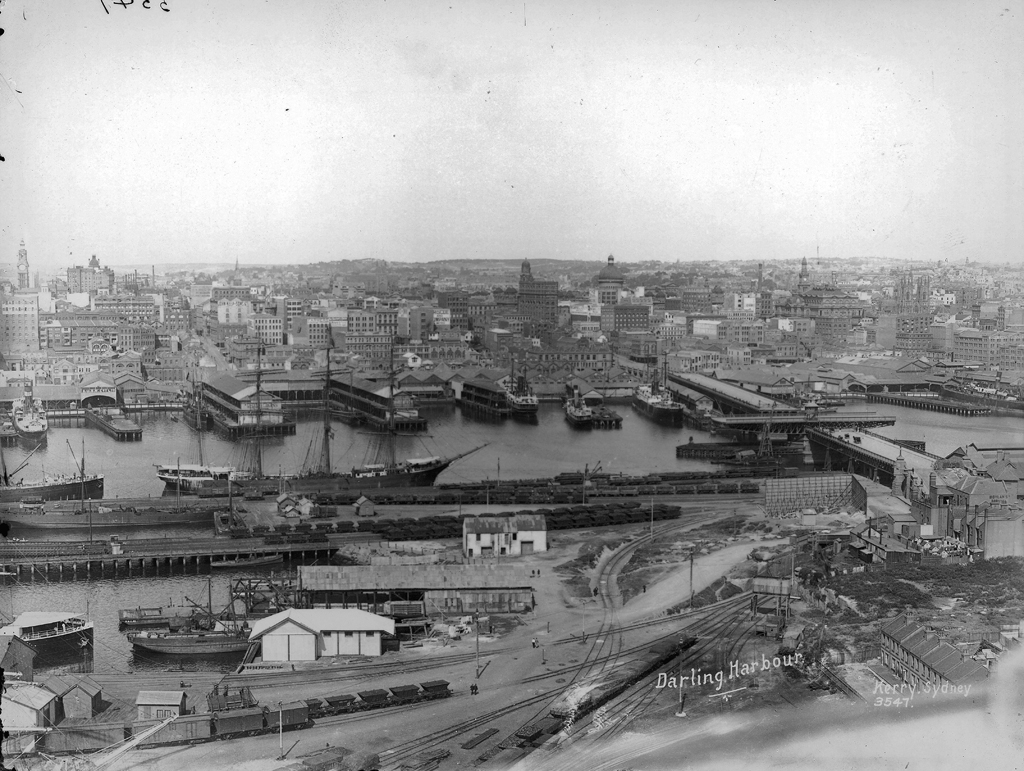
Darling Harbour as an industrial port in 1900

The original name of the land now known as Darling Harbour is Tambalong, in Dharag language.

Darling Harbour is named after Lieutenant-General Ralph Darling, who was Governor of New South Wales from 1825 to 1831. The area was originally known as Long Cove, but was generally referred to as Cockle Bay until 1826 when Governor Darling renamed it after himself. The name Cockle Bay has recently been restored in reference to the headwaters of the harbour. It was originally part of the commercial port of Sydney, including the Darling Harbour Railway Goods Yard. During the Great Depression, the eastern part of Darling Harbour (Barangaroo) became known as The Hungry Mile, a reference to the waterside workers searching for jobs along the wharves.

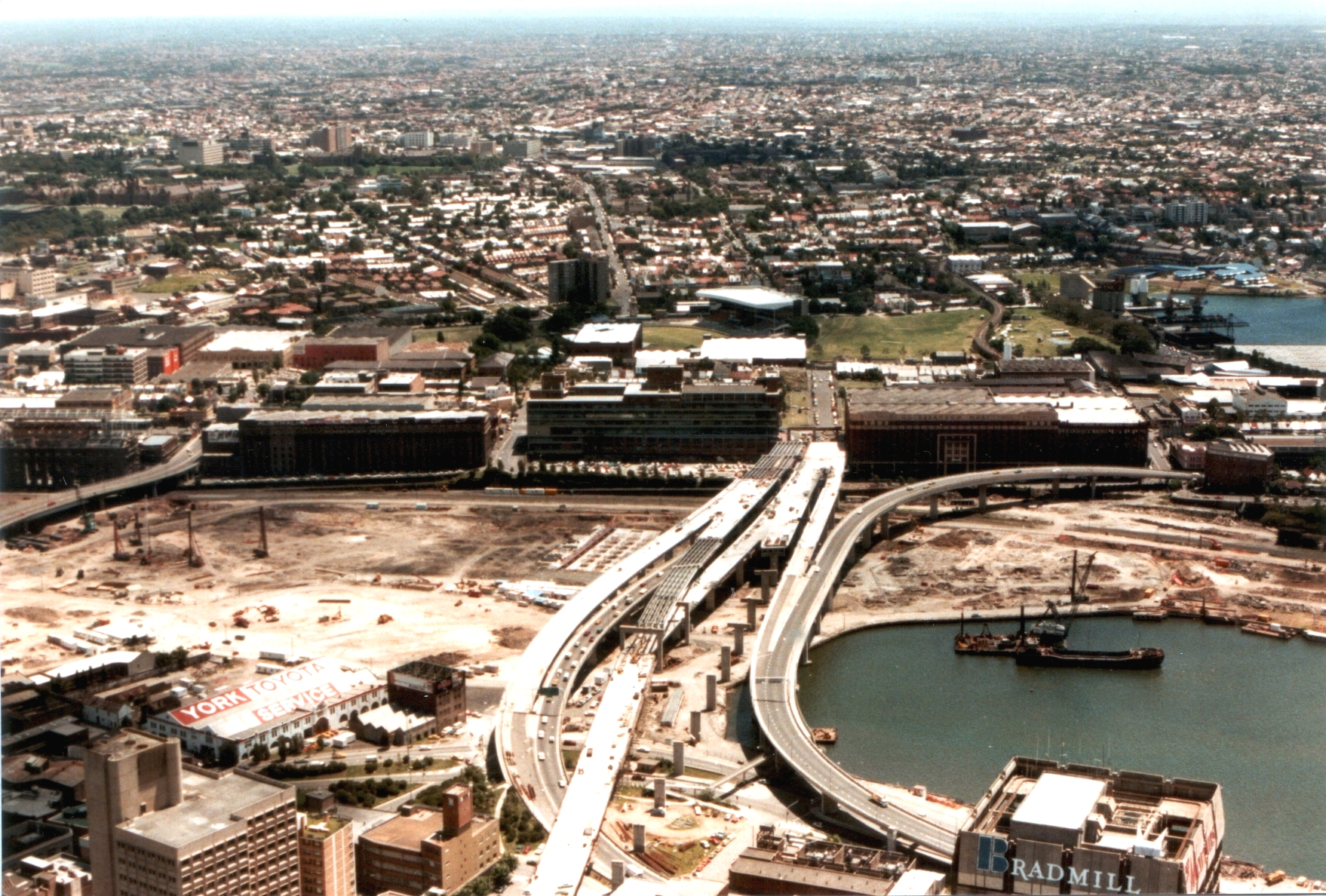
Redevelopment and urban renewal of the area in the early 1980s

Much of the land had been the site of the NSW Railways central marshalling yards and freight consolidation centre. The Enquiry into the NSW industry, including rail/road competition (1978–80), under Commissioner Gavan McDonell, found that this centre was inefficient, should be moved, and the land used for other public purposes. These recommendations were acted upon and by the mid-to-late 1980s, when the area had become largely derelict it was redeveloped as a pedestrian and tourist precinct as an initiative of then New South Wales Minister for Public Works, Laurie Brereton. The Sydney Convention & Exhibition Centre at Darling Harbour was a venue of the 2000 Summer Olympic Games and a key meeting venue of APEC Australia 2007.

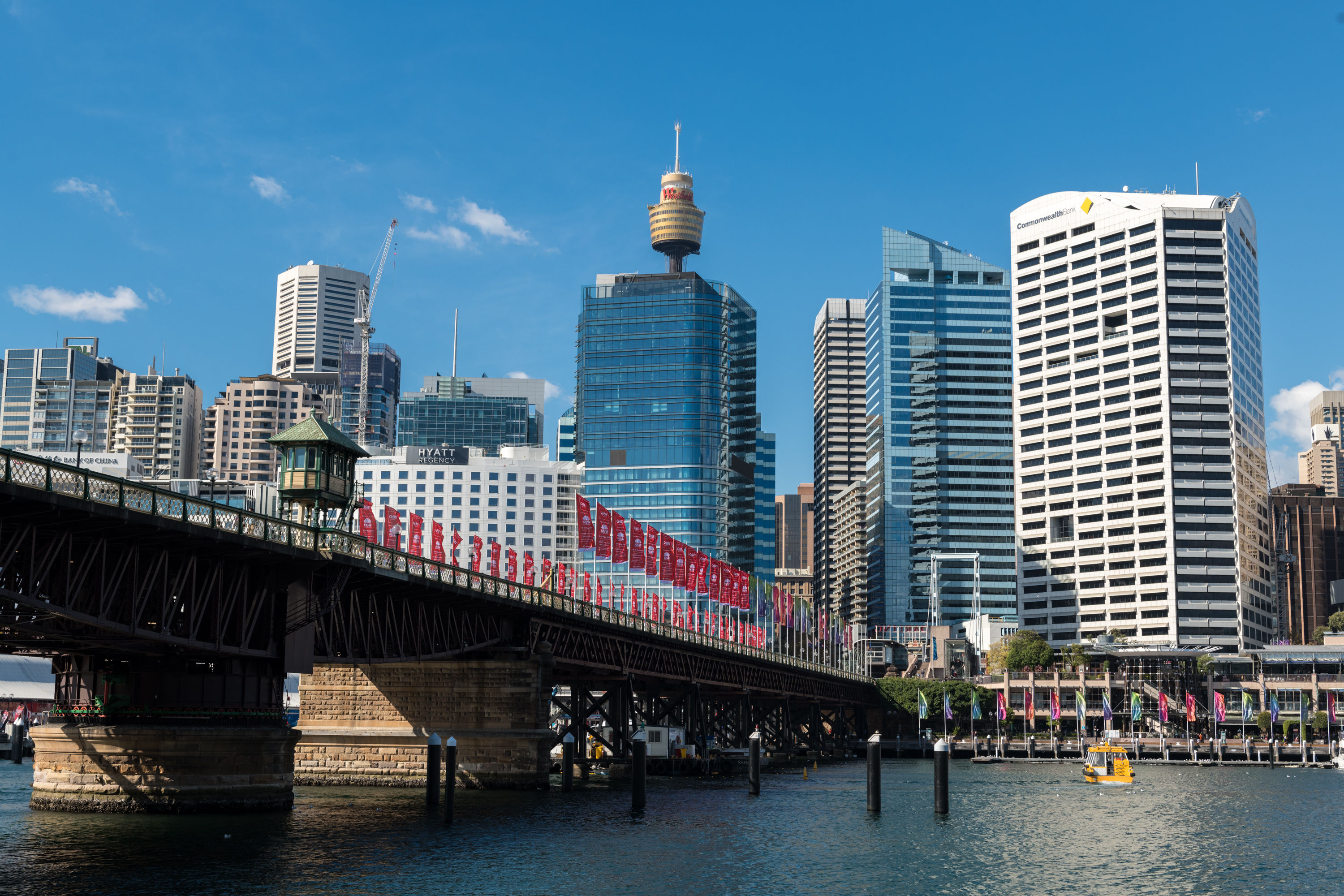
The heritage listed Pyrmont Bridge spans the width of the harbour

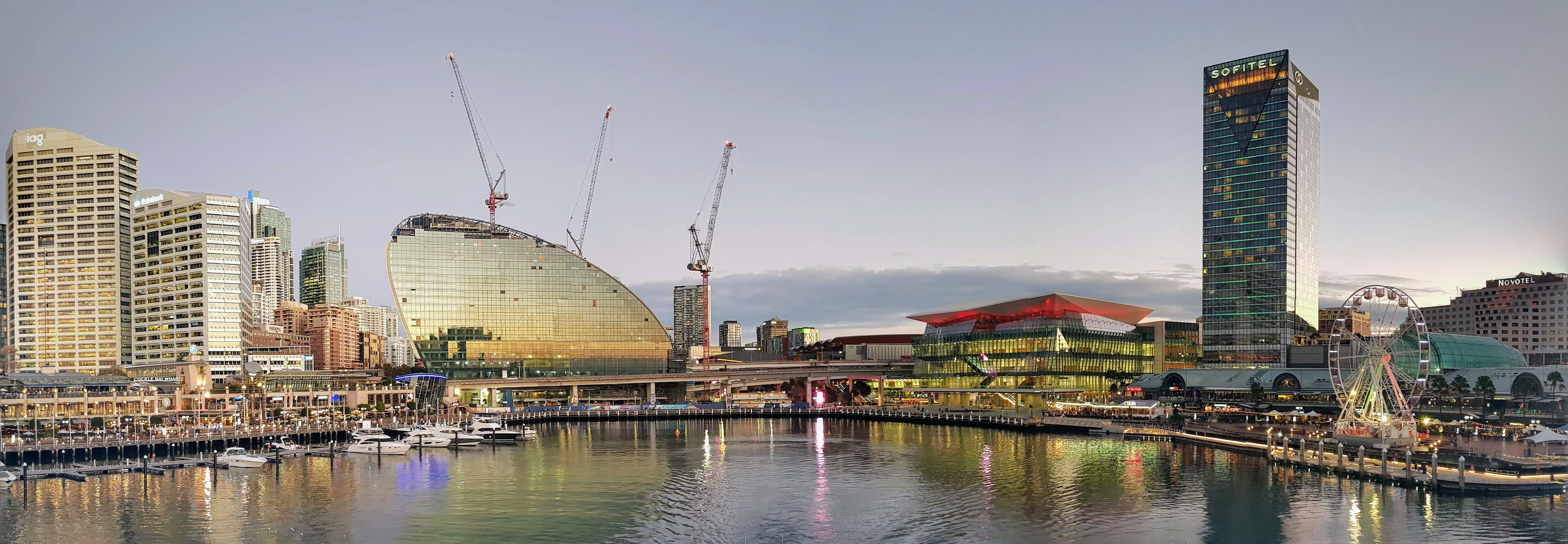
Cockle Bay, the southern end of Darling Harbour, in 2021, with Harbourside Shopping Centre (demolished in 2023) at right, and under-construction The Ribbon at left.

On 26 January 1994, Charles III then Prince of Wales, was giving a speech during the Australia Day celebrations. David Kang ran at the Prince whilst firing two blanks before falling onto the ground and being promptly held and arrested. The Prince was unhurt and was ushered off the podium.

== Heritage listings ==
Darling Harbour has a number of heritage-listed sites, including:

- Darling Harbour Woodward Water Feature
- Darling Harbour Carousel
- SS South Steyne
- Pyrmont Bridge

== Attractions ==
The Darling Harbour precinct is home to a number of major public facilities and attractions, including:

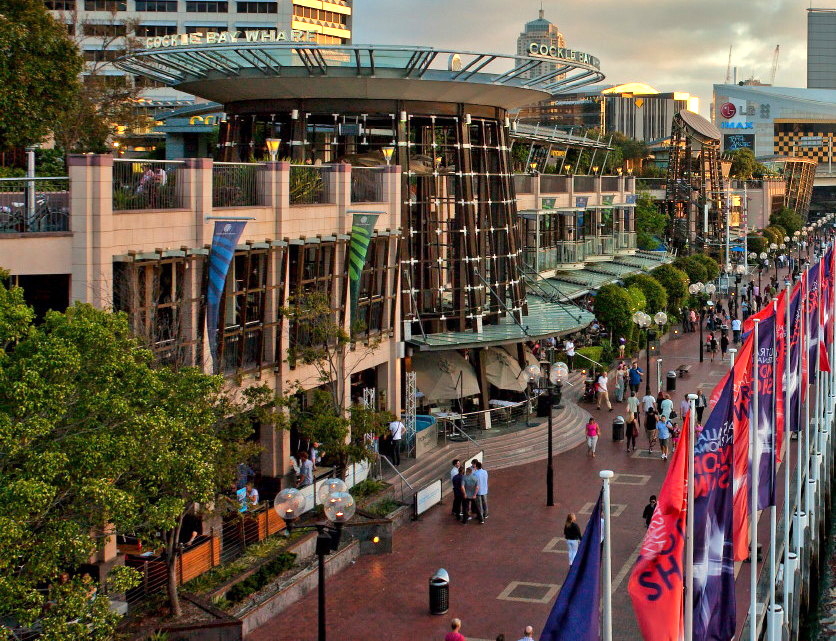
Cockle Bay Wharf

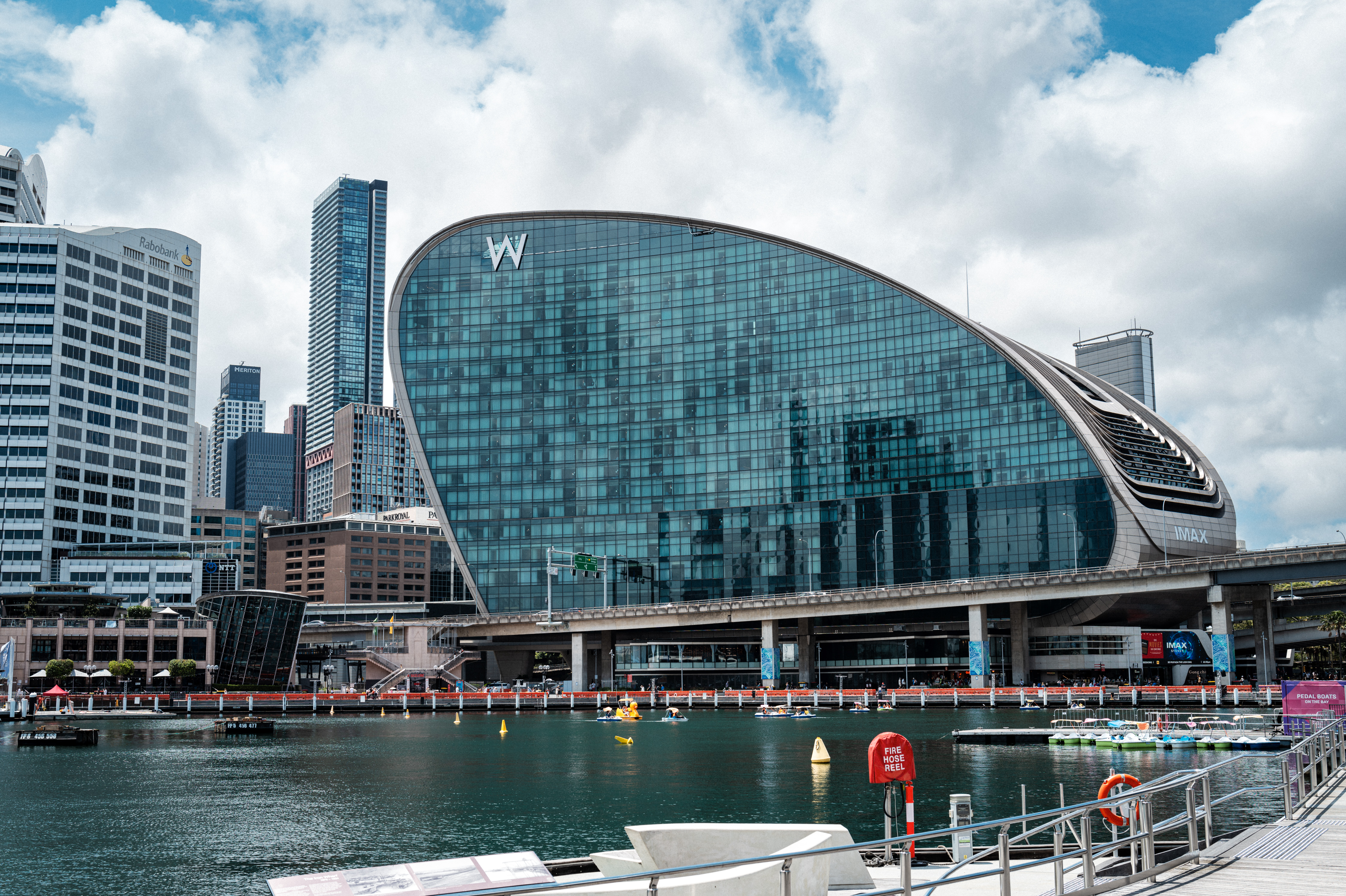
The Ribbon

- Cockle Bay Wharf (restaurants, bars and Home nightclub – one of Australia's largest nightclubs)
- IMAX Sydney theatre (part of The Ribbon building)
- Paddy's Markets
- Chinese Garden of Friendship
- Tumbalong Park
- Darling Quarter Playground and cafes
- Australian National Maritime Museum (featuring museum ships including HMAS Vampire)
- The Star Casino & Entertainment Complex
- The Darling Hotel & Spa
- Powerhouse Museum
- Sea Life Sydney Aquarium
- Madame Tussauds
- Wildlife Sydney Zoo
- Aboriginal Centre
- International Convention Centre Sydney (ICC Sydney), opened in December 2016
- Darling Square (modern complex of specialty shops, eateries and bars in South Darling Harbour and features Darling Square Library)

=== Former ===
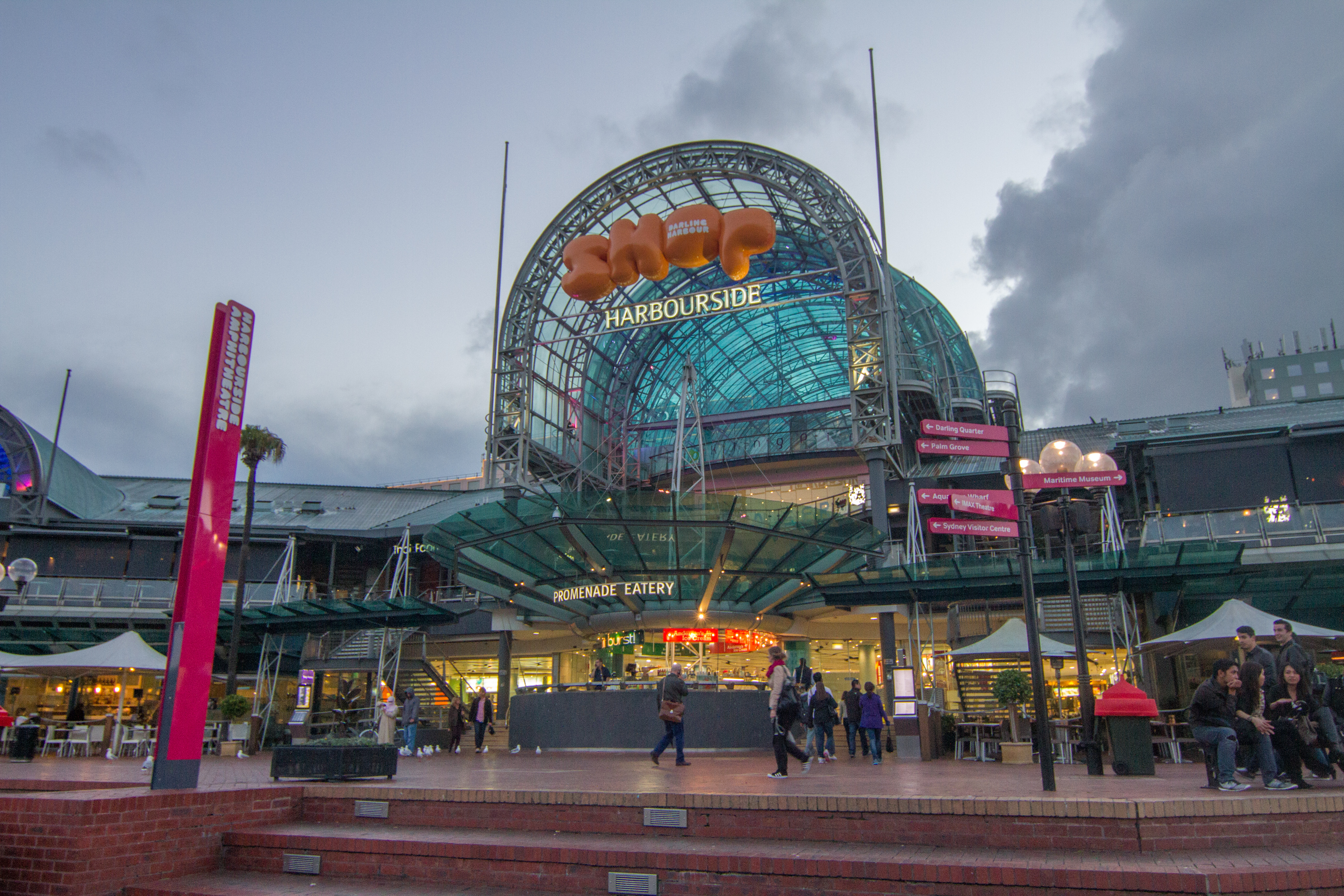
The former Harbourside Shopping Centre

- Harbourside Shopping Centre, which included Kingpin Bowling Alley (the only bowling alley in Darling Harbour), M9 Laser Skirmish, as well as Australia's first retail Jet flight simulator; closed for redevelopment since Spring 2022.

== Transport ==
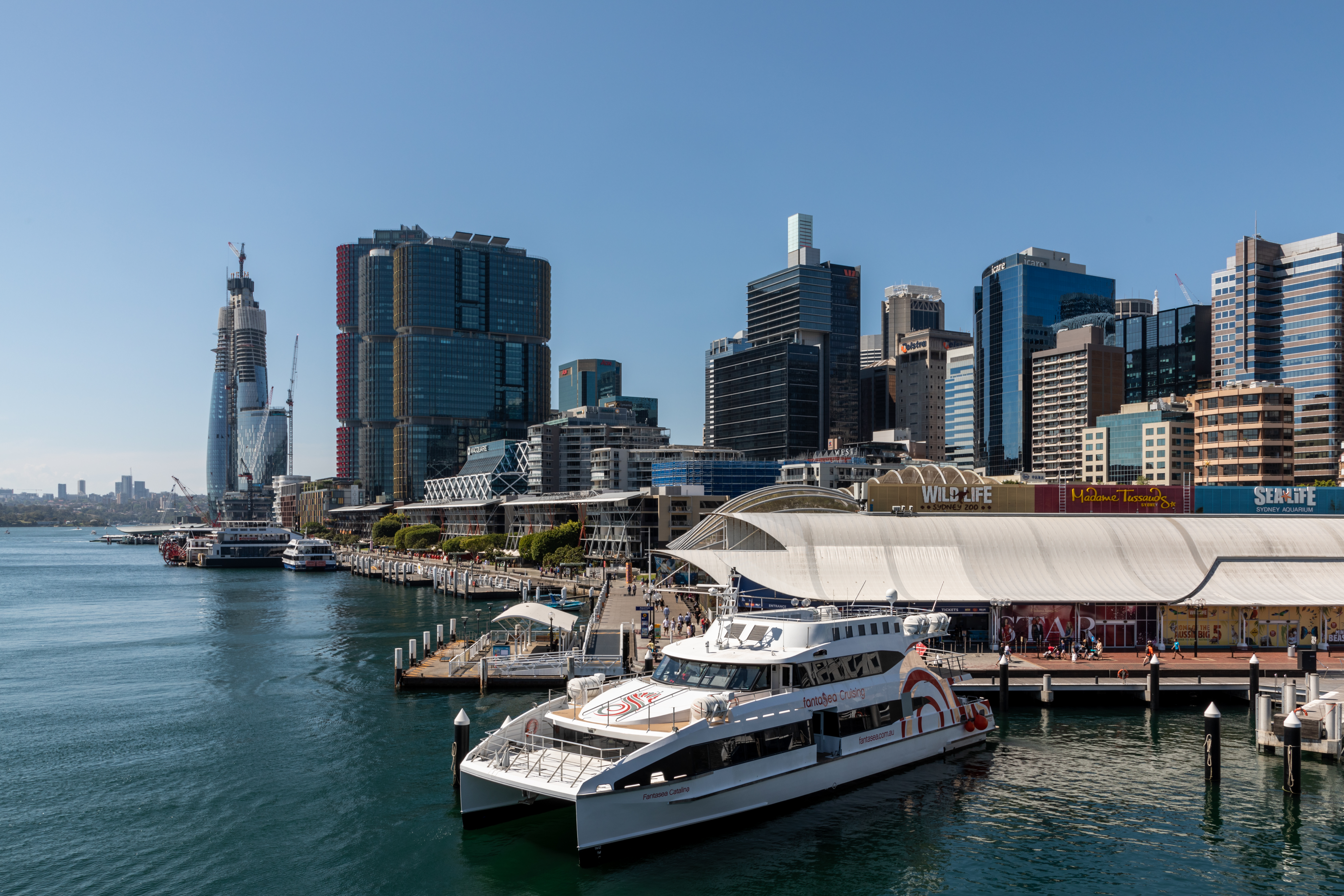
King Street Wharf, looking north towards Barangaroo in October 2019.

Darling Harbour is accessible via various modes of public transport. The precinct is served by the Inner West Light Rail of Sydney's light rail network, with access via Paddy's Markets, Convention, Exhibition and Pyrmont Bay stations. Ferry wharves including Barangaroo and Pyrmont Bay provide access to the Pyrmont Bay ferry services to Circular Quay and other suburbs while the Barangaroo wharf also provides access to the Parramatta River ferry services. King Street Wharf is accessible by private boat charters. The Goods Line is a park and pedestrian pathway connecting Darling Harbour to Railway Square and Central station. The nearest train station is Town Hall.

=== Proposed Metro station ===
Darling Harbour will be served by Pyrmont as a future rapid transit station that will be built as part of the Sydney Metro West project.

== Redevelopment ==
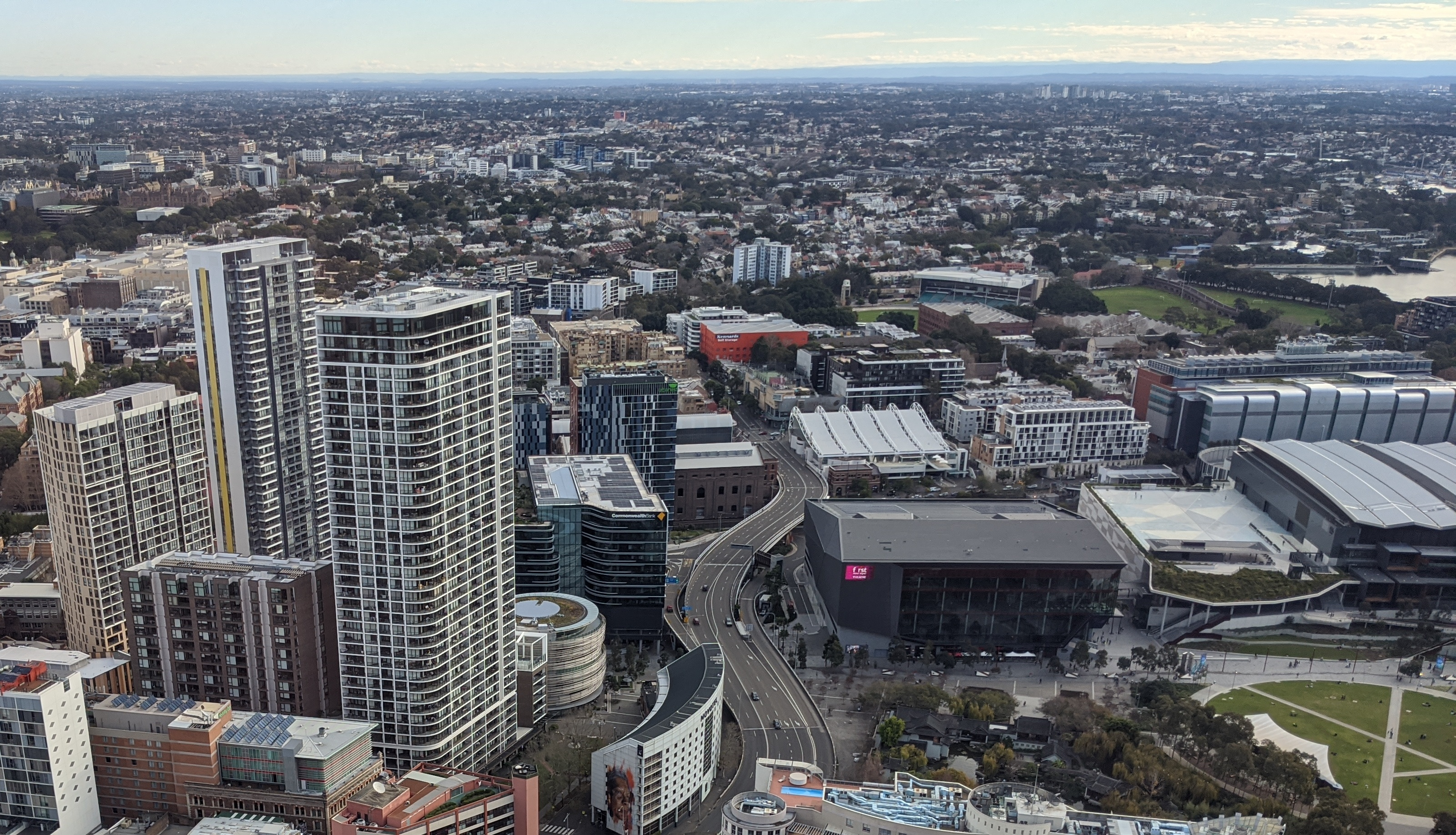
Darling Quarter has been the focus of a major mixed-use redevelopment in recent years

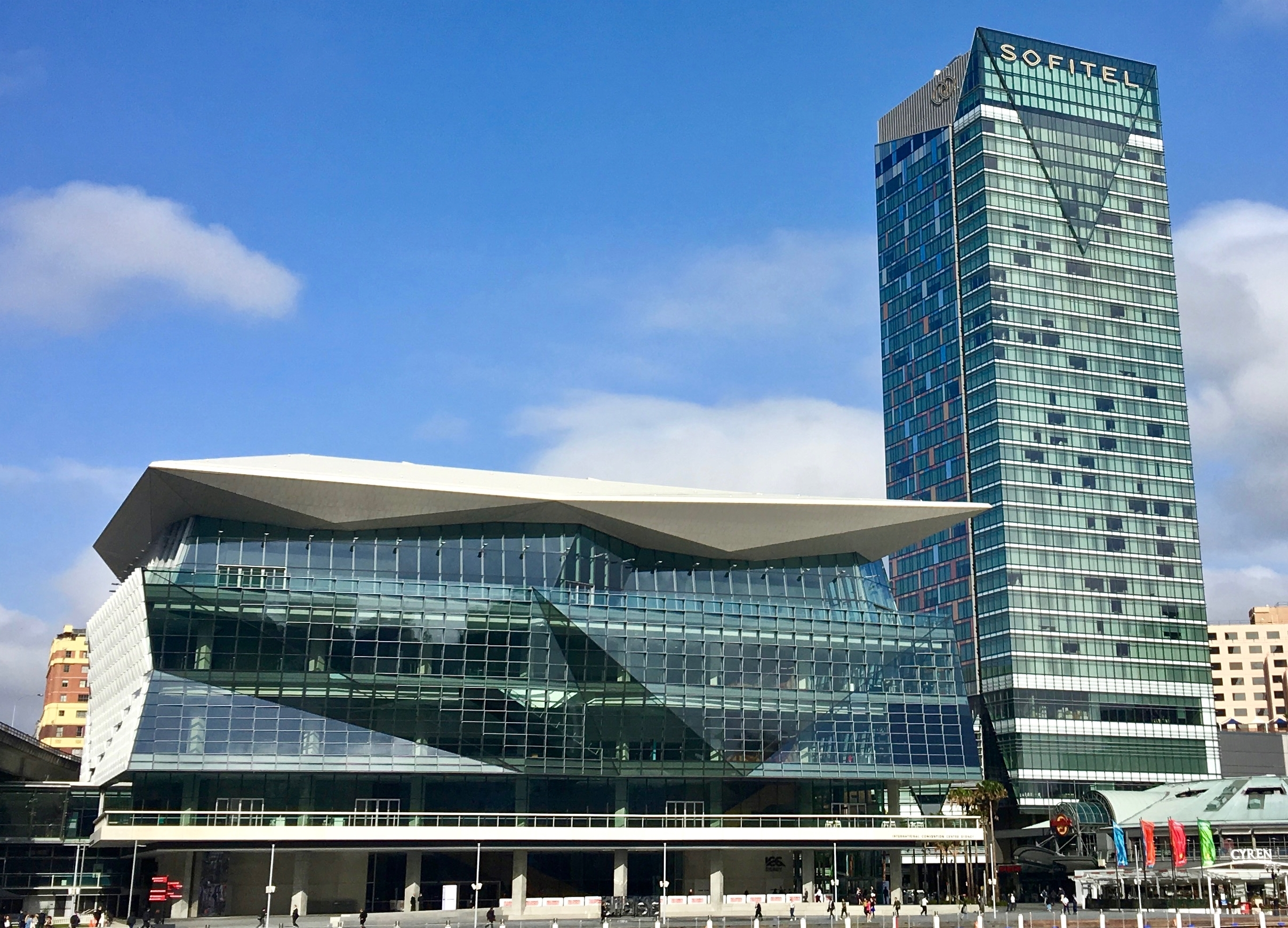
The International Convention Centre and the Sofitel Hotel

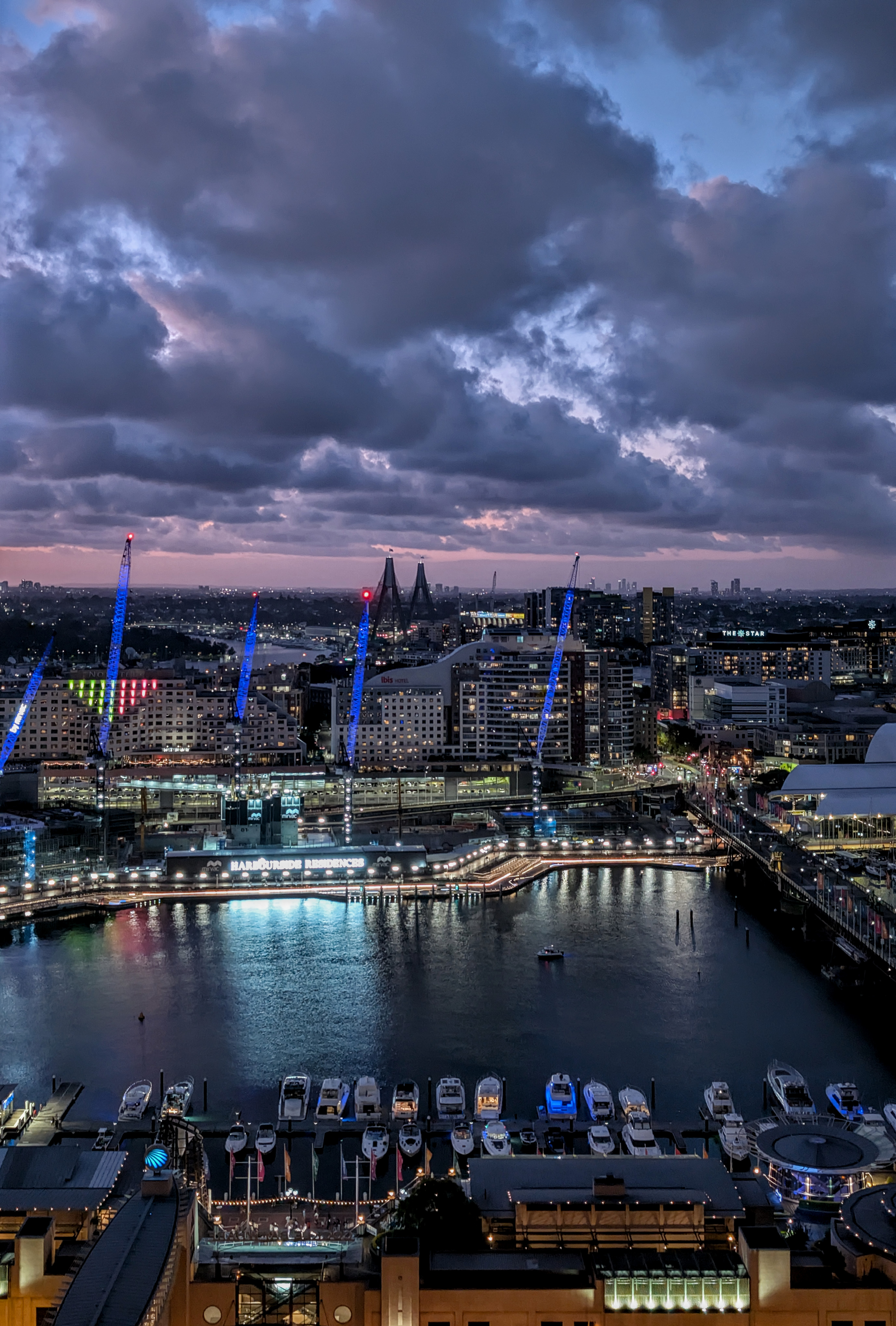
A view of Cockle Bay from the east, at dusk, showing work on the Harbourside Residences where the Harbourside Shopping Centre had previously stood

East Darling Harbour has been part of a large urban renewal development. Plans for the 18-hectare (44-acre) site include half business and residential developments, while the other half to be reserved for open public space. The state government of NSW declared plans for "Globe Street", a street designed to become Australia's and Asia Pacific's centre for corporate trade (styled on New York's Wall Street district). The urban renewal development was expected to be completed by 2020. East Darling Harbour is now known as a part of the Barangaroo precinct.

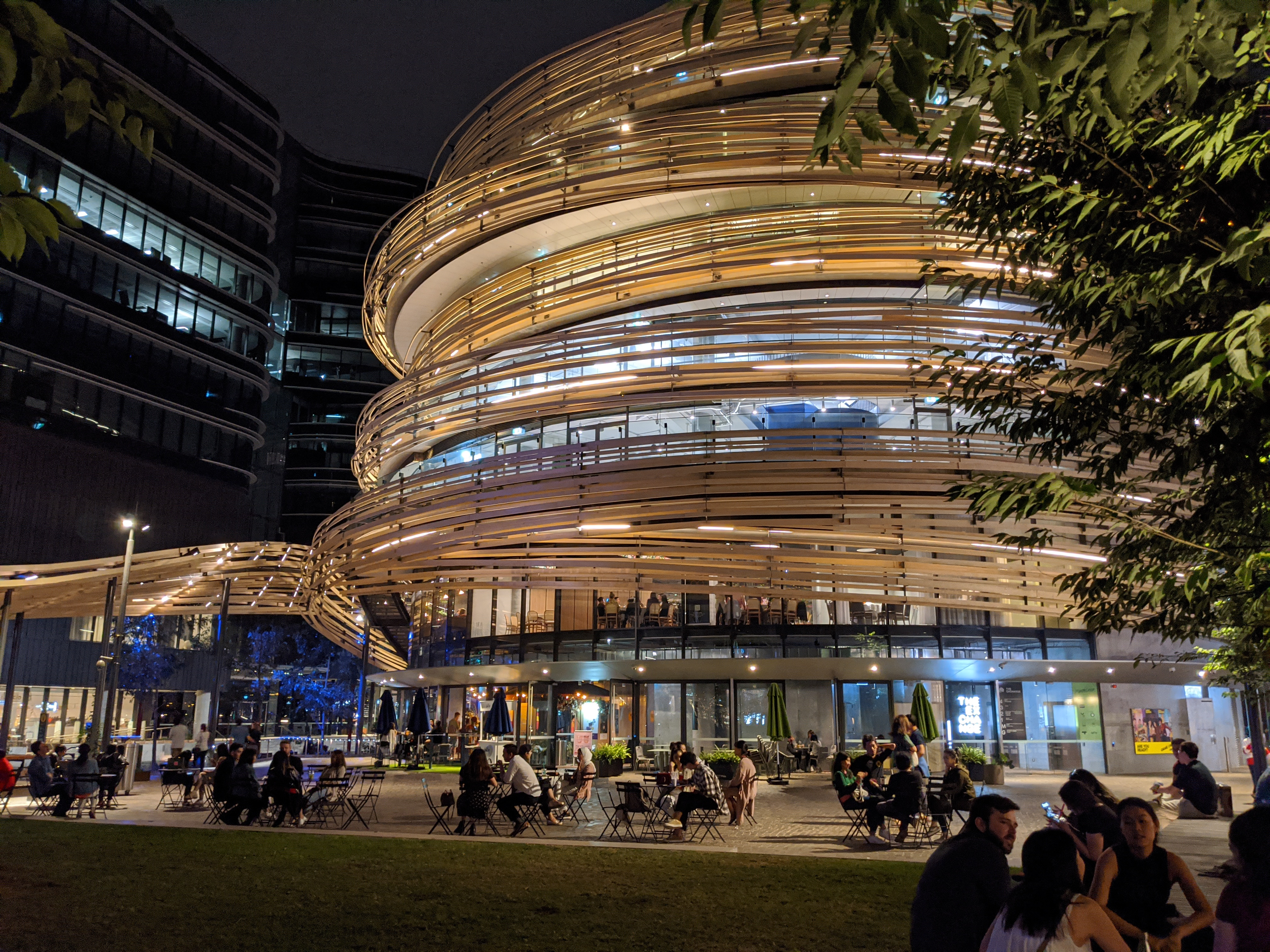
Darling Square

At the south end of Cockle Bay, the Sydney Convention & Exhibition Centre site was replaced by the new International Convention Centre Sydney (ICC Sydney), opened in December 2016. The new site includes a 40,000-square-metre (430,000 sq ft) exhibition facility. Other new facilities within the Darling Harbour region include the ICC Theatre, an 8,000 seat mixed purpose venue for concerts and intimate shows, replacing the Sydney Entertainment Centre, a gallery, and a 25 story multi purpose venue called The Ribbon (replacing the IMAX Theatre, which was closed and demolished in late 2016), opened on 11 October 2023 with an updated theatre.

This area was the site of the Sydney Port Authority and featured an Overseas Passenger Terminal (Wharf 8) which was mainly used by the Pacific Dawn of the P&O Cruises Australia fleet and the Sun Princess, operated by Princess Cruises. The passenger terminal is now in White Bay on the site of a former container terminal.

On the west side of Cockle Bay, the Harbourside Shopping Centre, built in 1988, was demolished in 2023, and a new Harbourside Residences project is under construction in 2024/2025.

== In popular culture ==
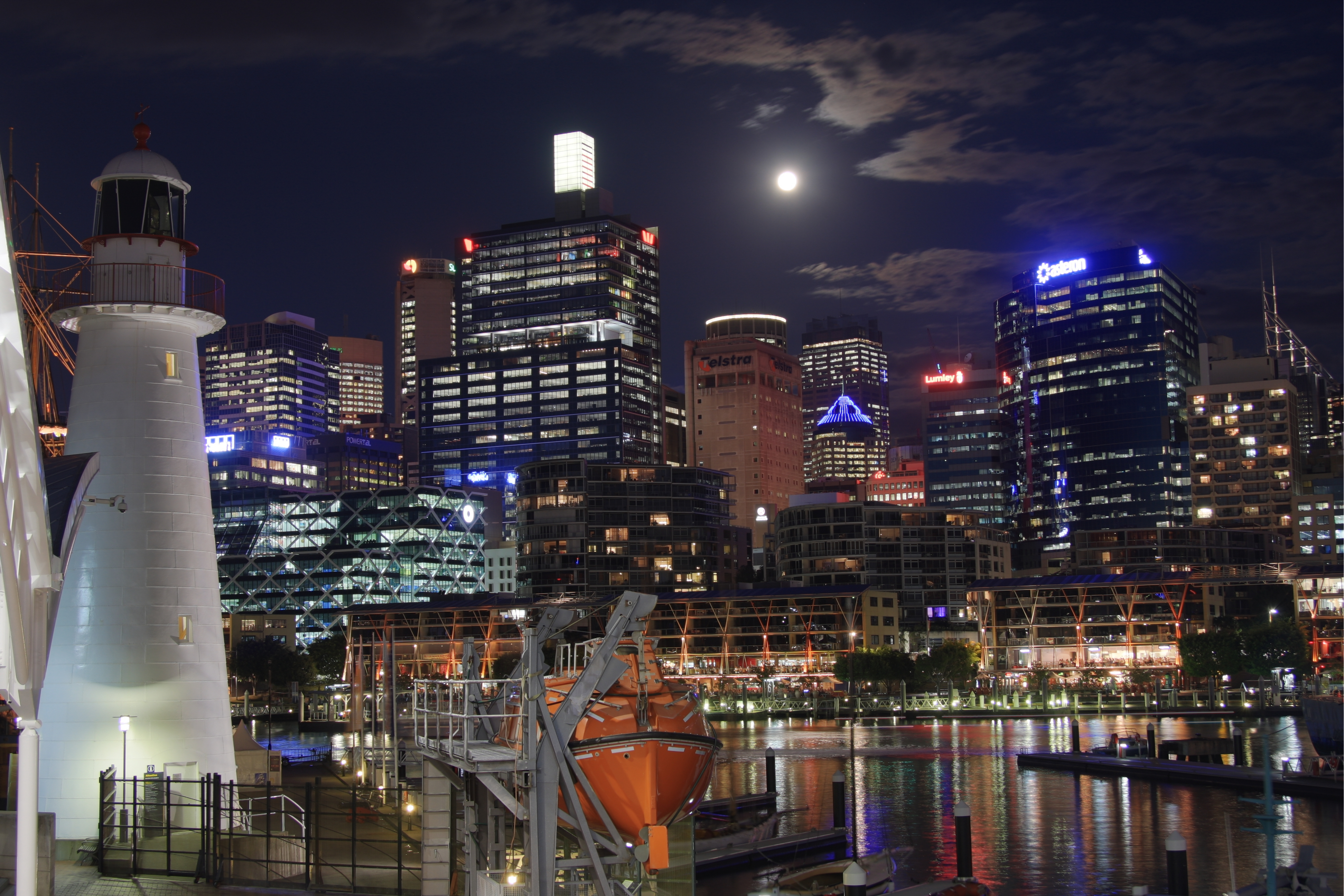
Darling Harbour from the National Maritime Museum, looking towards King Street Wharf 3. The area is a major tourist attraction

Darling Harbour is the location of the season residence on MTV's reality TV show, The Real World: Sydney, which aired in late 2007. The house has a large "Darling Harbour" sign along its edge, and the World Tower high rise building can be seen behind it.

20th Century Fox's 1995 film Mighty Morphin Power Rangers: The Movie was shot in Sydney, and featured some scenes filmed in Darling Harbour.

Seven's Saturday morning TV Music Show Eclipse Music TV is filmed weekly at the precinct's shopping centre, Harbourside.

On 27 August 2010, the soap opera Neighbours filmed scenes in the harbour and on board the cruise ship, Pacific Jewel.

Canadian post-hardcore band Silverstein recorded a song entitled "Darling Harbour" on their Transitions EP.
