= Darling Harbour Carousel =

The Carousel
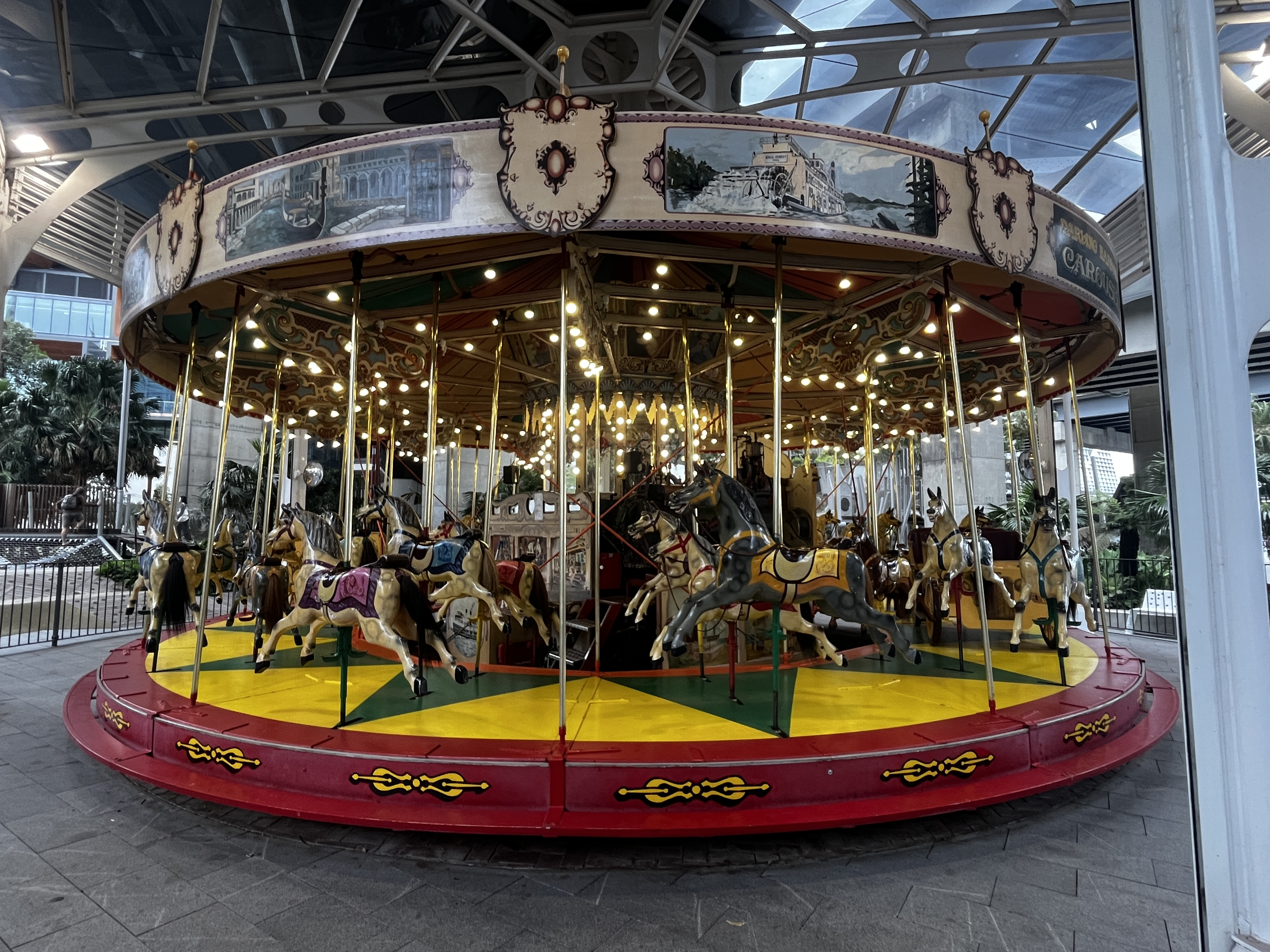

- Location within Sydney Location within Australia
- 33.8742°S 151.2011°E
- Location: Concourse under Western Distributor at Darling Harbour, Sydney central business district, City of Sydney, New South Wales, Australia

New South Wales Heritage Register
- Official name: Carousel, The; The Carousel; Darling Harbour Carousel
- Type: State heritage (movable / collection)
- Designated: 28 June 2002
- Reference no.: 1620
- Type: Funfair
- Category: Recreation and Entertainment

The Darling Harbour Carousel is a heritage-listed carousel located at the concourse under the Western Distributor at Darling Harbour in the Sydney central business district, New South Wales, Australia. It is also known as The Carousel. It was added to the New South Wales State Heritage Register on 28 June 2002.

== History ==
The Darling Harbour Carousel was purchased and imported to Australia in 1894 by Thomas Kale. It was purchased second-hand and required extensive refurbishment, including the replacement of the planks between the horses with a continuous platform. At that time the horses had no rise and fall motion. Around 1910 Kale employed Herbert Thompson, an Australian engineer, to design and install a system to enable the horses to "gallop". Kale operated the carousel in 1912 outside the Customs House at Circular Quay as part of the official celebrations for the arrival of the American Naval "White" Fleet. In the 1920s Kale sold the Carousel to his son, David Kale.

Under David Cale's ownership the Carousel travelled around NSW and was a regular fixture at most major agricultural shows, fairs and special events. Many of the painted scenes which decorated the Carousel were redone during this era by a local artist, Paddy Murray. The Carousel appeared in the Sydney Royal Easter Show from the 1920s to 1939, and operated in various other locations and events. From 1941, the Carousel was lodged at Manly Amusement Pier, the wartime conditions restricting its operations. The Carousel recommenced operation after the end of World War II at Manly Pier.

In 1951 David Kale sold the Carousel to Porter and Smit, the operators of the Manly Amusement Pier. An electric motor drive system was fitted to the Carousel in 1951. In 1957 the Carousel was purchased by David Kale's grandson, Allen. Allen Kale had assisted his grandfather with its operation in Sydney prior to World War II. The Carousel recommenced operations in 1957. The condition of the carousel had deteriorated in the period between World War II and 1951. Alan Kale refurbished various aspects of the carousel. The carousel remained fixed at Manly until the 1970s.

In 1986 the Carousel was purchased by the Darling Harbour Authority to be a permanent fixture in the Darling Harbour Authority area. It was stored for two years, then put into operation in 1988, until 1990, when Allen Kale was engaged to manage and oversee its restoration which continued until 1993. A special pavilion was built over the carousel in 1993 to protect it when not in operation (designed by architect Feiko Bouman). Allen Kale's son Bruce, a sign writer, was involved in the restoration of the paintings and paintwork of the carousel.

The Carousel has been in operation in Darling Harbour, during weekends and school holidays since 1996.

== Description ==
The Darling Harbour Carousel is a portable, three row, suspended-gallopers carousel (fitted with thirty wooden horses and two replica vintage cars). It is driven by an electric motor but retains its complete steam boiler and engine intact and operable, through the boiler is currently out of commission. It is fitted with Gebruder Bruder pneumatic band organ. The carousel is permanently stationed within an octagonal pavilion which has steel framing, a glazed roof and metal roller shutter doors between each of the eight posts supporting the roof.

The carousel is founded on a four-wheel centre truck made up from a timber wagon. The central, vertical drive shaft of the centre truck turns a set of twelve horizontal timber beams called "swifts", radiating from the centre shaft. The timber floor platform is supported by a substructure of radial beams and intermediate struts. The horses are three abreast and occupy ten of twelve segments of the circular platform, the other two having replica vintage cars. The carousel is covered by a canvas dome canopy, and liberally festooned with lights.

The two power systems to drive the Carousel are both mounted on the centre truck. One is the original steam boiler and engines, the other being the electric motor which is used at present.

The decorative panels and artwork of the carousel are: on the rounding boards around the outside of the roofing structure, on the twelve top centre shutters of the centre truck, on the portable bottom centre shutters which conceal the centre truck, on the banner boards hanging from the swifts between the rows of horses, around the floor and sides of the floor platform. Decoration includes timber panelling, mirrors, and painted scenes including: Venetian gondolas, Aboriginal Australians hunting kangaroos, Native Americans pursuing a western covered wagon, sea shells, various animals, nursery rhyme scenes, a lighthouse, tall ships and a Manly ferry steamship.

The band organ is manufactured by Gebruder Bruder. It is a 52 key stop pipe organ with two drums, one of which has a cymbal. The organ is wholly contained within a varnished timber casing - elaborately decorated. The machine is pneumatically operated, controlled by a perforated paper roll. The organ is mounted on a four-wheel timber carriage, acquired from a farm in NSW c. 1960 and converted for this purpose.

The Darling Harbour Carousel is a rare, complete and intact example of an Edwardian carousel, and is representative of a wider variety of similar machines. The Darling Harbour Carousel retains its steam engine and original workings, and demonstrates the methods of construction and operation that are associated with the "golden age" of carousels (1890s and 1920s).

=== Modifications and dates ===
- date initially built unknown
- 1894 - imported to Australia
- c. 1910 - system installed to enable horses to 'gallop'
- 1920s - painted English scenes redone and replaced with Australian scenes
- 1938 - boiler reconstructed by "Carmichaels" boiler works
- 1948 - crankshafts for galloping motion renewed
- 1951 - electric motor drive system fitted to Carousel
- 1950s - machine refurbished, much of timber replaced (platform), horses repaired, electric switch gear refurbished
- unknown date - two sleighs/chariots replaced by replica vintage cars
- 1963 - steam engine and boiler refurbished
- 1960s - Band Organ refurbished, painted scenes repaired / refurbished
- 1976 - wrought iron rods tying radial beams to centre shaft replaced with steel rods
- 1990-1993 - Carousel restored, and a special pavilion erected over it

== Heritage listing ==
The Darling Harbour Carousel is a rare, complete and intact example of an Edwardian carousel, and is representative of a wider variety of similar machines. The Darling Harbour Carousel retains its steam engine and original workings, and demonstrates the methods of construction and operation that are associated with the "golden age" of carousels (1890s and 1920s). Its rich decorations are entertainingly attractive and form both an expression of traditional fairground architecture and an exposition of the popular idiom, appropriately demonstrating on-going adaptation to times and places.

The Darling Harbour Carousel has been part of Sydney's cultural life for most of the twentieth century, associated with many major cultural festivals and events, and has travelled throughout much of NSW as a central entertainment of the important agricultural shows and fairs. It continues to entertain children and adults alike in its present location as part of a major tourist locality in Sydney.

The Carousel was listed on the New South Wales State Heritage Register on 28 June 2002 having satisfied the following criteria.

The place is important in demonstrating the course, or pattern, of cultural or natural history in New South Wales.

The Darling Park Carousel is closely associated with the late Victorian - Edwardian era of country fairs and amusement parks; the period in which mechanical amusement devices were introduced into social recreational activities.

The development of fairgrounds and travelling shows has a range of historic associations relating to the impact of the industrial revolution and the accompanying social changes during the nineteenth century. Fairgrounds and travelling shows occupied, in their time, a position of much more importance than amusement parks have today, when there is a wide diversity of recreational activities and opportunities.

The place is important in demonstrating aesthetic characteristics and/or a high degree of creative or technical achievement in New South Wales.

The Carousel is a complete and integrated visual attraction, with a fine balance of different elements such as mirrors, lights, painted screens and painted embellishments. All the elements combine to create a single entity which is impressive both for the total aesthetic effect and the fine details.

The Darling Harbour Carousel demonstrates a high degree of aesthetic skill in the details of its decorations, and particularly in the carved timber elements such as the horses and centre shutters.

The place has a strong or special association with a particular community or cultural group in New South Wales for social, cultural or spiritual reasons.

The Carousel is a popular attraction within a heavily used tourist precinct in Sydney. Its continued high level of patronage is evidence of the interest and enjoyment that it continues to provide for the citizens of, and visitors to, the city.

The place has potential to yield information that will contribute to an understanding of the cultural or natural history of New South Wales.

The Carousel has the ability to demonstrate the workings of a steam-driven carousel as they were operated at the turn of the century.

The place possesses uncommon, rare or endangered aspects of the cultural or natural history of New South Wales.

The Darling Harbour Carousel is one of the very few traditional carousels surviving in the world which retains its original form and fittings, especially its steam propulsion unit, intact and in working order.

The Darling Harbour Carousel is believed to be the oldest known operating carousel in Australia.

The Darling Harbour Carousel has been operated by a single family for most of its life and as such, reflects the tradition of the carnival family that is a central aspect of the cultural environment that created such machines in the latter half of the nineteenth century.

The Darling Harbour Carousel provides an opportunity in NSW to experience a traditional amusement park "joy ride" on a permanent, daily basis. This experience is rare in NSW today, following the redevelopment of Luna Park.

The place is important in demonstrating the principal characteristics of a class of cultural or natural places/environments in New South Wales.

The Darling Harbour Carousel is a representative example of carousels manufactured in England in the 1890s. It is believed to be the oldest known operating carousel in Australia.

The Darling Harbour Carousel is a fine representation of the bright, attractive and rich decoration in the popular arts idiom applied to carousels. It demonstrates both traditional English decorations alongside a range of local adaptations of the English style.

The Darling Harbour Carousel demonstrates the principal characteristics of construction, materials, fittings and decoration associated with the peak period of carousel construction.
