= IMAX Sydney =

IMAX theatre in Sydney, Australia

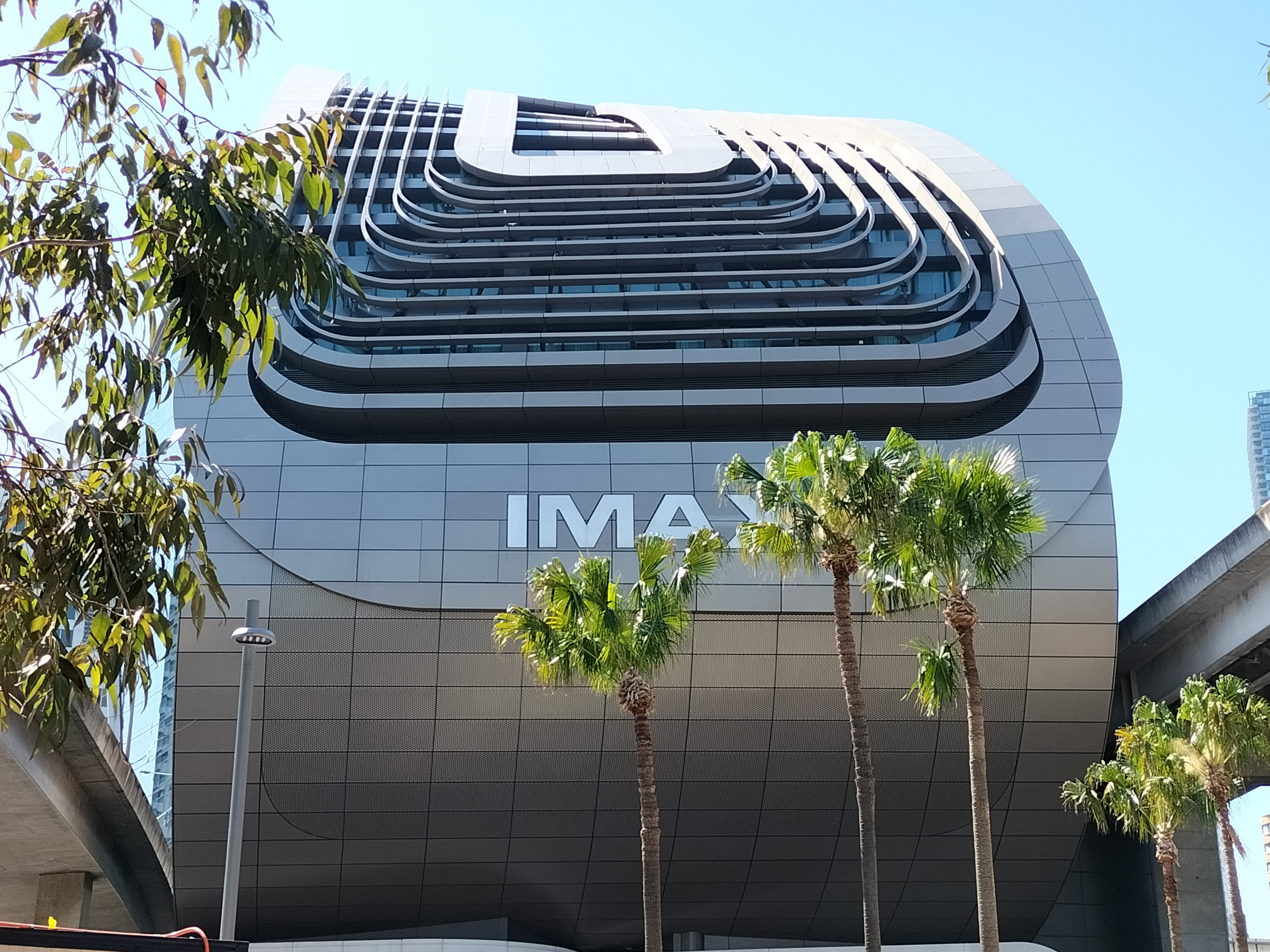
- Interactive map of IMAX Sydney
- Former names: Panasonic IMAX
- Address: 35 Wheat Road; Sydney; Australia
- Coordinates: 33.877898°S 151.199573°E

Construction
- Opened: 1996
- Closed: 2016
- Reopened: 2023

Website
- https://www.eventcinemas.com.au/Cinema/IMAX-Sydney

IMAX Sydney is an IMAX movie theatre in Darling Harbour, Sydney, Australia. It is the second largest IMAX theatre in the Southern Hemisphere, (Note: The largest IMAX theatre in the Southern Hemisphere is IMAX Melbourne in Victoria, Australia.) and the third largest in the world. (Note: The largest IMAX theatre in the world is located in Leonberg, Germany.) It is operated by Event Cinemas and is located within The Ribbon. It features IMAX's dual laser projector.

The original IMAX Sydney theatre was originally built as a standalone building in 1996. It was closed and demolished in 2016 as part of a broader redevelopment of the Darling Harbour area, making way for The Ribbon building. The new theatre was reopened within the new building in 2023, with updated screening technology and amenities, albeit with a slightly smaller screen size due to physical constraints within the new building.

== History ==
In 1995, after 18 months of negotiations with the Darling Harbour Authority, Cinema Plus Pty Ltd received approval to construct an IMAX theatre in Sydney. The cinema featured a Grand Theatre screen with the capacity to seat 540 people, and its construction cost $18 million AUD.

IMAX Sydney opened on 26 September 1996. At the time of opening, it featured a 40m x 30m screen, as well as an IMAX 15/70 projector. The cinema opened with a party that was attended by 700 guests who viewed a screening of the film The Living Sea.

In 2012, a new 29.7m x 35.7m screen was installed at a cost of $250,000.

On 25 September 2016, the cinema was demolished in order to make way for a new complex called The Ribbon that was planned to open in 2019.

On 11 October 2023, after 4 years of delays, the cinema reopened with a screening of Avatar: The Way of Water. After its reopening, the cinema featured 430 seats with an IMAX dual laser projection system, as well as a 12 Channel sound system and a 29m x 24m screen.

== Other IMAX theatres in Australia ==
Australia currently has 9 other IMAX theatre locations, including cinemas in Canberra, the Gold Coast, Other locations in Sydney, Perth and Melbourne, with more planned. Only IMAX Melbourne is a comparable location as all other locations are limited to 1.90:1 Laser Projection. When compared to IMAX Melbourne, IMAX Sydney is smaller as its screen is 29 m × 24 m (95 ft × 79 ft) while IMAX Melbourne's is 32 m × 23 m (105 ft × 75 ft), IMAX Melbourne also features a 1570 projector, while IMAX Sydney does not, furthermore IMAX Melbourne has seating for 461 people, while IMAX Sydney has enough for 430.

== Gallery ==
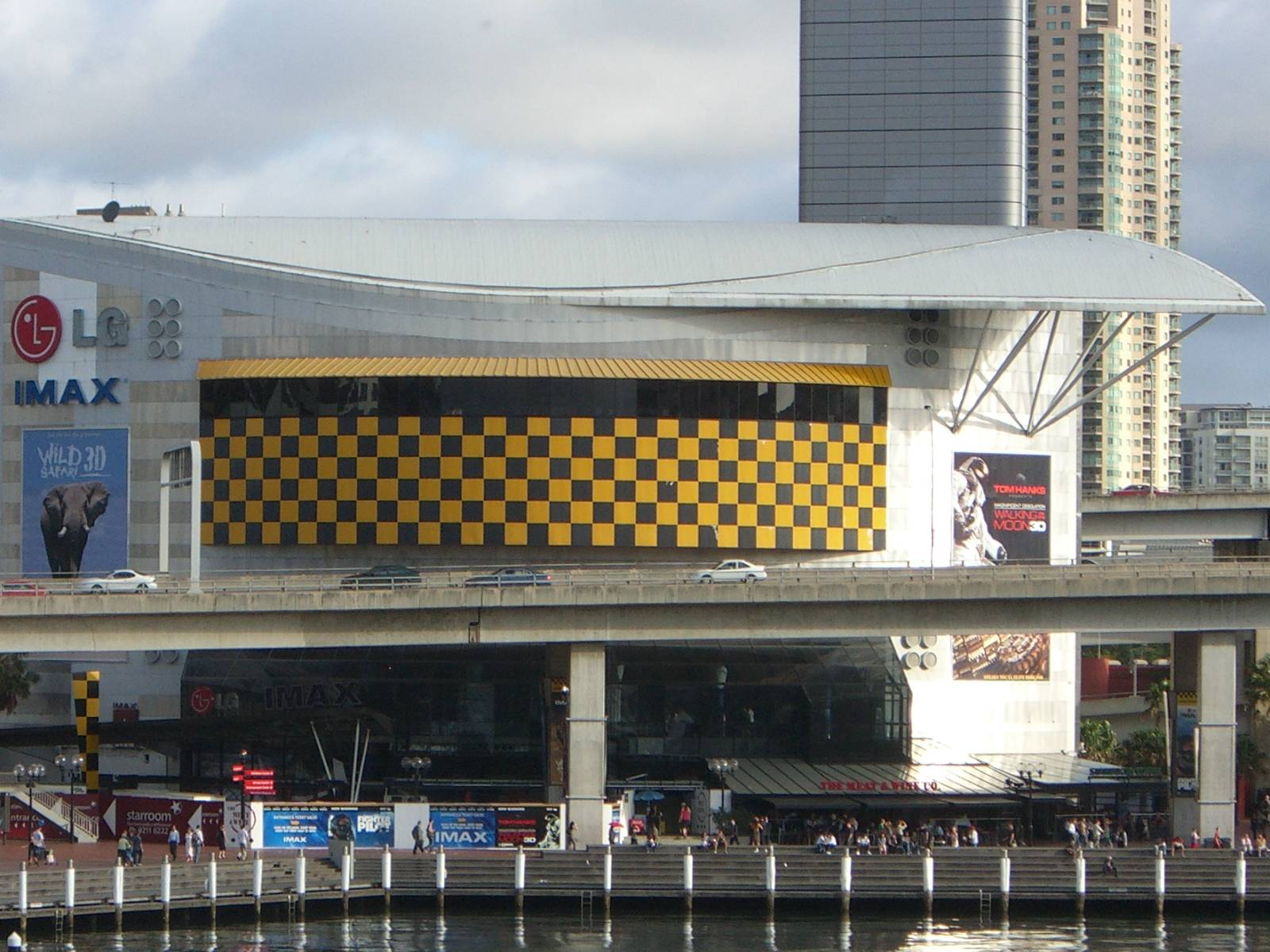
The original IMAX Sydney building in 2005

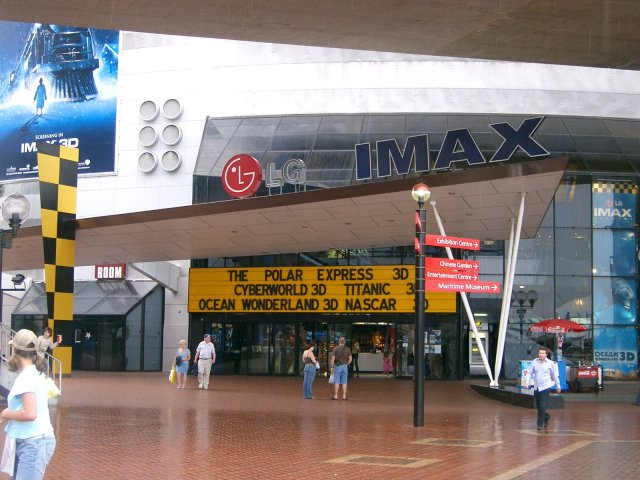
Entrance to the original building, 2005
