= Traumpalast Leonberg Theater =

Largest IMAX theater in the world

Traumpalast Leonberg IMAX Theater
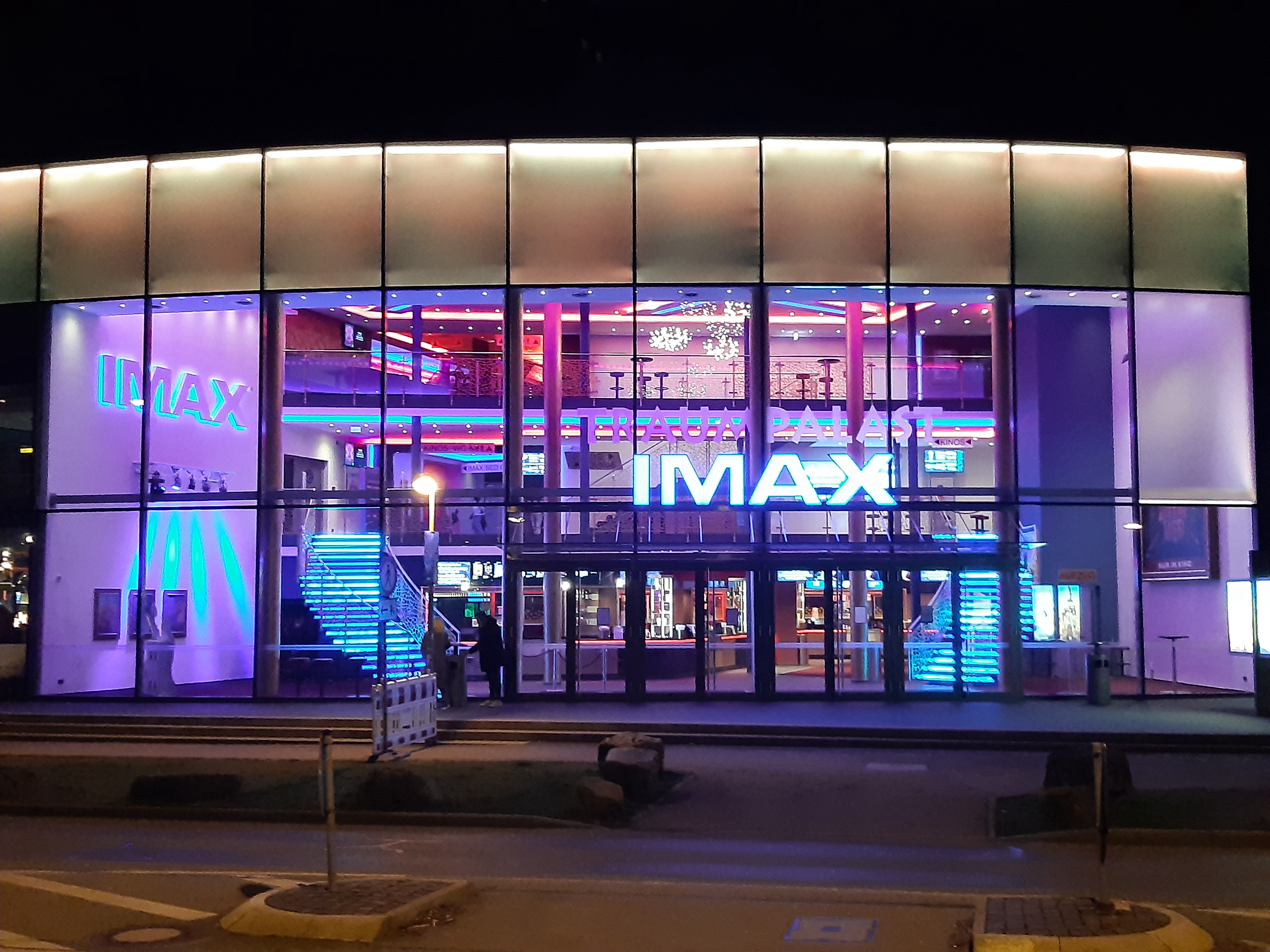
- Entrance for the IMAX expansion of the theater
- Interactive map of Traumpalast Leonberg IMAX Theater
- Address: Neue Ramtelstraße 2 Leonberg, Baden-Württemberg; Germany
- Coordinates: 48.7824086°N 9.0154621°E
- Operator: Lochmann Filmtheaterbetriebe
- Type: IMAX theater
- Screen: 11

Construction
- Opened: July 2016; September 30, 2021 (Extension)
- Builder: Lochmann Filmtheaterbetriebe

Website
- www.imax.com/theatres/imax-leonberg

Traumpalast Leonberg IMAX Theater is a movie theater at Neue Ramtelstraße 2, 71229 Leonberg, Germany. The theater houses the largest operating cinema screen in the world, which is an IMAX screen, measuring 814.8 m^{2} (8,770 ft^{2}) (38.8 m × 21 m (127 ft × 69 ft)) and weighs over 500 lb (230 kg). In addition, the theater has 1,800 seats with IMAX’s dual laser projection system and 12 channel digital sound. The halls are equipped with 3D technology and Dolby Atmos, some with moveable D-Box Motion Seats.

== History ==
The theater originally opened in July 2016 and also has a restaurant inside.

In April 2019, it was announced that IMAX would be renovating the theater to build the largest IMAX screen in the world. The newly renovated theater opened with the premiere of the James Bond film No Time to Die. The extension also included a bowling alley, a second restaurant and a bed cinema.

== See also ==
- IMAX Melbourne
- BFI IMAX
