= IMAX Melbourne =

Largest IMAX theatre in the Southern Hemisphere

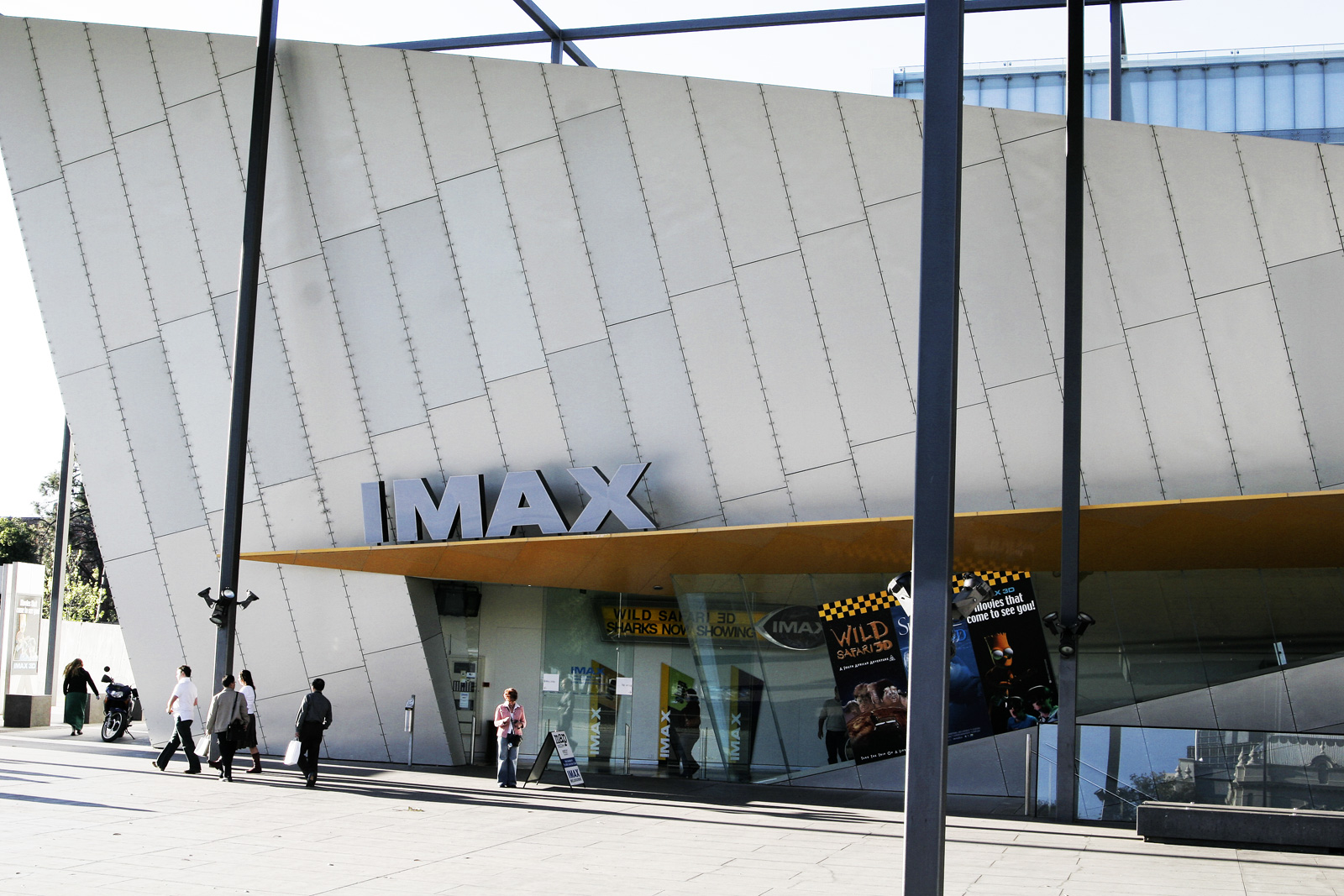
- IMAX Melbourne main entrance
- Interactive map of IMAX Melbourne
- Address: Rathdowne St, Carlton; Melbourne; Australia
- Coordinates: 37°48′12″S 144°58′14″E
- Owner: Museums Victoria
- Type: Cinema
- Public transit: Melbourne Museum/Nicholson St (#11): 86, 96; Bus routes 250, 251, 402

Construction
- Opened: March 1998; 28 years ago

Website
- imaxmelbourne.com.au

IMAX Melbourne is an IMAX movie theatre in Carlton, Melbourne, Australia. It is the largest IMAX theatre in the Southern Hemisphere, the largest 1.43:1 screen in the world, and the second largest IMAX theatre in the world by overall screen size and capacity. (Note: The largest theatre in the world is Traumpalast Leonberg Theater, located in Leonberg, Germany.) It is owned and operated by Museums Victoria and is located eight storeys beneath the Melbourne Museum. It features IMAX's dual laser projector, as well as an IMAX 1570 film projector.

== History ==
Initial plans for the theatre were drafted in 1994 as part of the renovation of the Melbourne Museum. Final plans were announced in 1996, with construction scheduled to begin in May of that year. After delays, final bids for the project were solicited in September 1996. During construction, more delays were encountered due to contaminated soil and water seepage. The cinema opened in March 1998 with a screening of the film Everest. At the time of opening, the screen was 31 m × 23 m (102 ft × 75 ft).

The cinema closed twice in the 2010s. In 2013, the cinema closed in order to receive a new IMAX digital xenon system that was installed alongside the existing 1570 projector, as well as to receive an upgraded screen. Two years later, the cinema was closed again in order to replace said system with a new upgraded IMAX dual laser projection system, as well as an upgraded IMAX 12 Channel sound system. To make room for the new dual laser projectors, the 1570 projector was removed and put into storage.

In 2016, following the closure of IMAX Sydney, IMAX Melbourne became the world's largest IMAX theatre, until the opening of the Traumpalast Leonberg Theater in Germany in 2021.

In 2017, after negotiations with the IMAX Corporation, the 1570 projector was reinstalled alongside the dual laser projectors for the release of Dunkirk. With the release of Oppenheimer in 2023, IMAX Melbourne was one of only 30 cinemas in the world, and the only location in the Southern Hemisphere, able to project the film on 1570. (Note: Attributed to many sources.)

In 2025, IMAX Melbourne was one of 26 cinemas worldwide to sell tickets for The Odyssey one year in advance, with showings selling out in 24 hours. In 2026, with the films release, IMAX Melbourne was one of only 41 cinemas in the world, and the only location in the Southern Hemisphere, able to project the film on 1570.

The cinema is located eight storeys beneath the Melbourne Museum, is the largest IMAX theatre in the Southern Hemisphere and the second largest in the world by screen size, at 32 m × 23 m (105 ft × 75 ft). The cinema seats 461 people, including 25 VIP seats. The cinema features an IMAX 12 Channel Digital sound system as well as one IMAX dual laser projector and one IMAX GT3D 1570 film projector.

== Comparison to other IMAX theatres in Australia ==
Australia currently has 9 other IMAX theatre locations, including cinemas in Canberra, the Gold Coast, other locations in Melbourne, Perth and Sydney, with more planned. Only IMAX Sydney is a comparable GT location as all other locations are limited to 1.90:1 Laser Projection. When compared to IMAX Sydney, IMAX Melbourne is larger as its screen is 32 m × 23 m (105 ft × 75 ft), while Sydney's is 29 m × 24 m (95 ft × 79 ft). IMAX Melbourne also features a 1570 projector, while IMAX Sydney does not. Furthermore, IMAX Melbourne has seating for 461 people, while IMAX Sydney has enough for 430.

== See also ==
- BFI IMAX
- Melbourne Museum
- IMAX Sydney
