= BFI IMAX =

IMAX cinema with the UK's largest screen

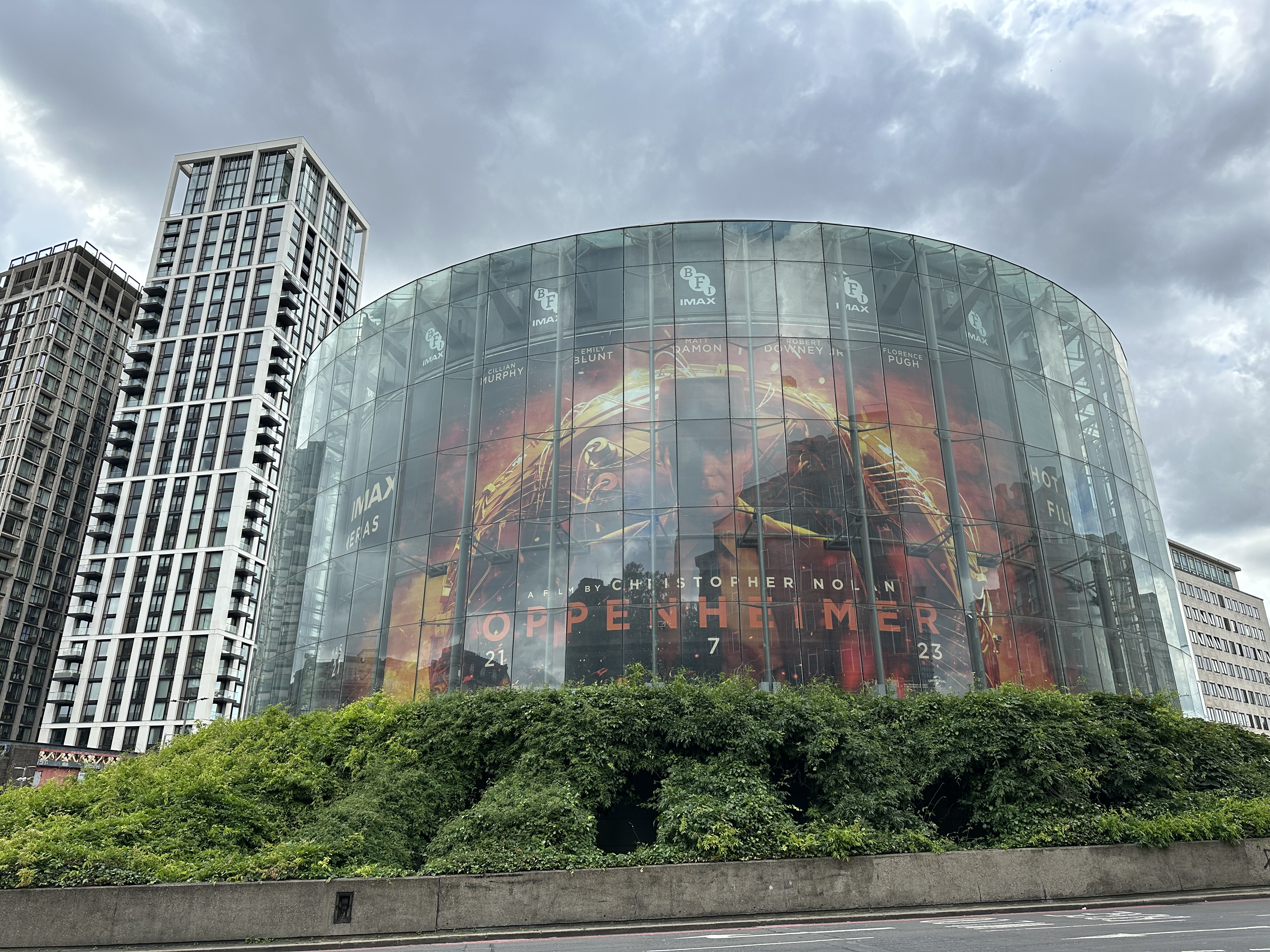
- Oppenheimer poster at the BFI IMAX in 2023

- Location within Greater London
- Address: 1 Charlie Chaplin Walk; South Bank; London; SE1 8XR; United Kingdom
- Coordinates: 51.505°N 0.113611°W
- Owner: British Film Institute
- Operator: British Film Institute (1999–2012, 2022–) Odeon Cinemas (2012–2022)
- Capacity: 493 (including 4 wheelchair spaces)
- Type: Cinema
- Public transit: Waterloo; Waterloo; Waterloo East

Construction
- Opened: May 1999; 27 years ago
- Architect: Bryan Avery

Website
- www.bfi.org.uk/bfi-imax

The BFI IMAX is an IMAX cinema in the Waterloo district of London, just north of Waterloo station. It is owned and operated by the British Film Institute. From 2012 until 2022, it was operated by Odeon Cinemas.

The cinema is located in the centre of a roundabout junction with Waterloo Road to the south-east, Stamford Street to the north-east, York Road to the south-west and Waterloo Bridge to the north-west.

== History ==
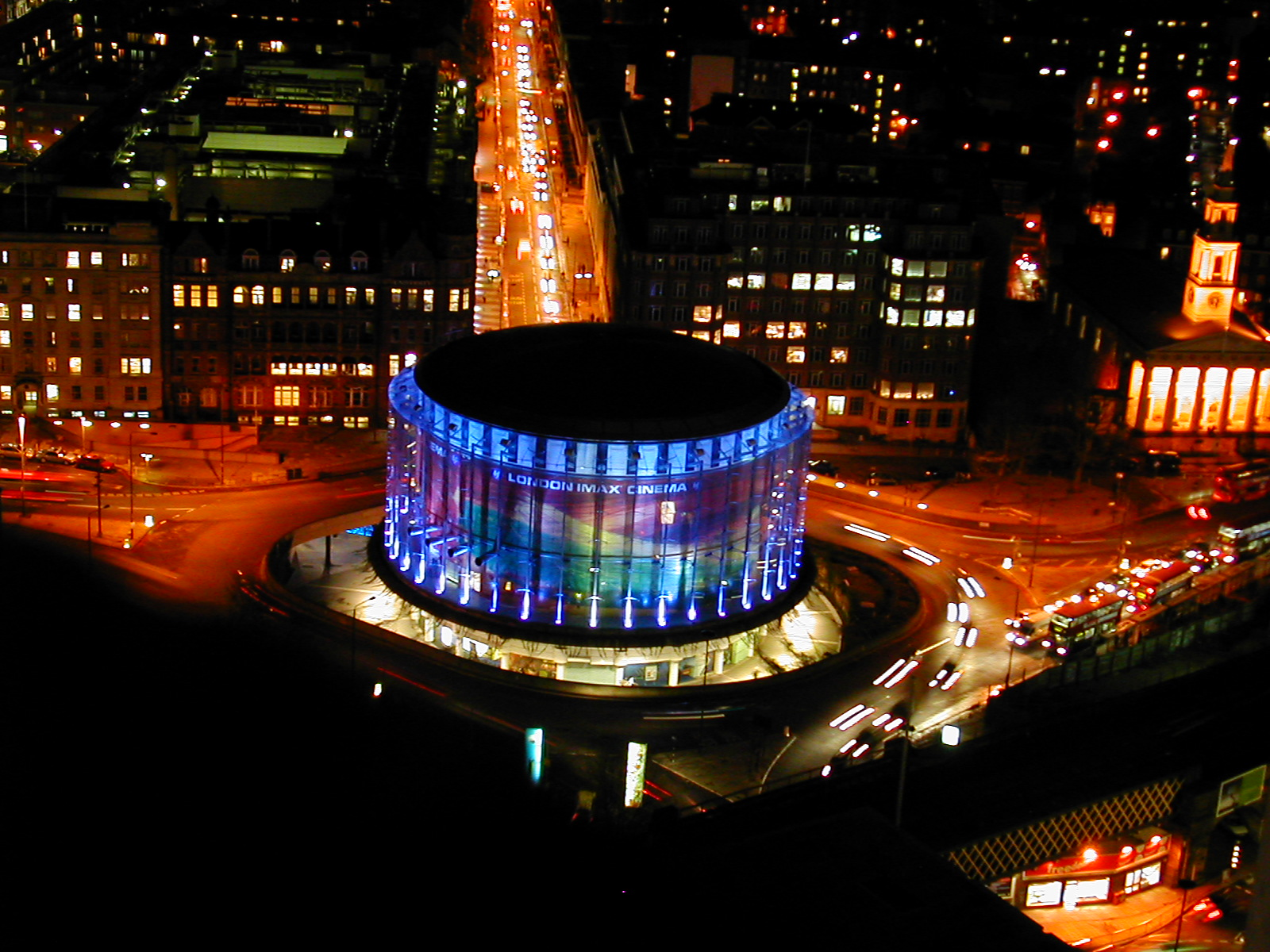
Aerial view at night

BFI IMAX was designed by Bryan Avery of Avery Associates Architects and completed in May 1999. The screen is the largest in Britain (20 m (66 ft) high and 26 m (85 ft) wide). It has a seating capacity of 500 and a 14,000 W (19 hp) digital surround sound system. Although the site is surrounded by traffic and has an underground line just four metres below, the architects and engineers accounted for this in their design and the entire upper structure sits on anti-vibration bearings to prevent noise propagation.

The cinema won several awards at the time of opening, including a Design Council Millennium Product Award in 1999 and a Civic Trust Award in 2000.

In 2012, the 65 ft-tall screen was replaced and dual digital IMAX laser-powered projectors were installed alongside the existing 70mm IMAX projector, it also has a standard D-Cinema projection system, plus scope to project from 35mm and standard 70mm. In July 2012, the BFI announced that Odeon Cinemas had been selected to operate it for the next five years, with the option of termination after three years. Odeon maintained the film programmes and booking of tickets online and by telephone. This gave customers the opportunity to watch operas on the giant screen. However, the BFI retained power over the cinema's operation, including parts of the film schedule, the name and the technical operation.

To start this move to mainstream cinema, the BFI London IMAX theatre celebrated by having sold 66,000 pre-booked tickets for The Dark Knight Rises in just five weeks, giving a total sale in tickets of £1,000,000 even before the premiere of the movie.

In June 2022, the BFI announced that its ten-year concession deal with Odeon would end on 19 July 2022, with the BFI regaining control of operations. The cinema closed on this date, with a planned re-opening on 22 July

== Other IMAX cinemas in London ==
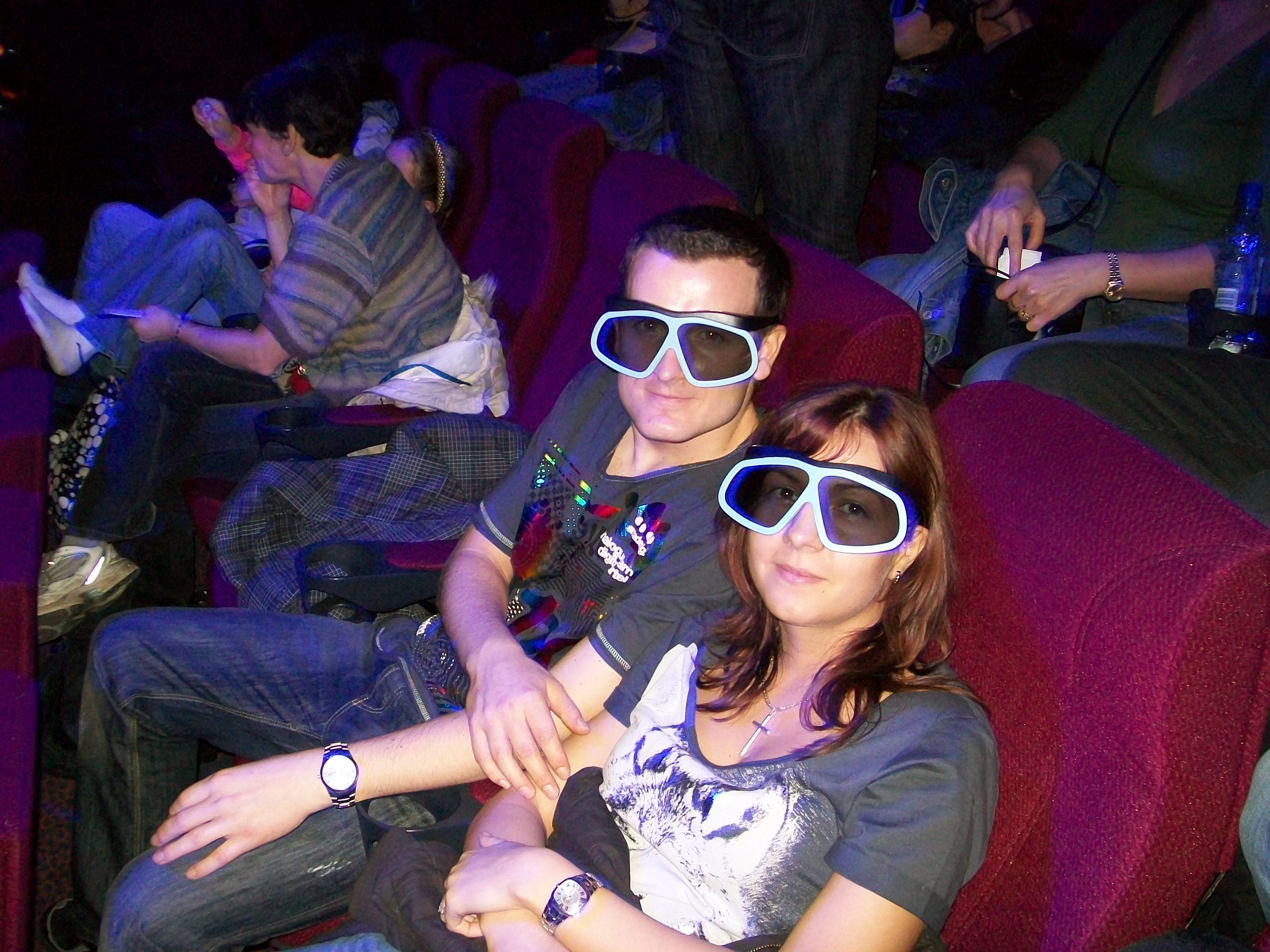
Seating in the cinema

London has another traditional size IMAX cinema at the Science Museum in South Kensington and in December 2008 gained smaller IMAX digital cinemas at Odeon cinemas in Greenwich and Wimbledon. In 2011, a digital IMAX screen was also opened at the Odeon in Swiss Cottage.

== Screen-size comparison with other large London screens ==
The BFI IMAX is the largest cinema screen in the United Kingdom. It measures 25.9 m (85 ft) wide by 19.8 m (65 ft) tall with a total screen size of 512.8 m^{2} (5,520 ft^{2}) (289 m^{2} (3,110 ft^{2}) for a 2.39:1 film, 363 m^{2} (3,910 ft^{2}) for 1.85:1 and 469 m^{2} (5,050 ft^{2}) for IMAX 1.43:1).

Before its October 2022 refurbishment it measured 26.5 m (87 ft) wide by 20 m (66 ft) tall, which meant that a film with an aspect ratio of 2.39:1 would only use 293 m^{2} (3,150 ft^{2}) of the screen, or 379 m^{2} (4,080 ft^{2}) for a 1.85:1 film and 491 m^{2} (5,290 ft^{2}) for an IMAX 1.43:1 film. The auditorium seats 493, including 4 wheelchair spaces.

Large format screens in London by size
Cinema	Screen	2.39:1 area	1.85:1 area	Projector	Sound
Cineworld (Empire) Leicester Square	IMAX	295 m^{2} (3,180 ft^{2})	380 m^{2} (4,100 ft^{2})	2 x IMAX Laser (4K each)	IMAX 12ch
BFI IMAX	IMAX	280 m^{2} (3,000 ft^{2})	365 m^{2} (3,930 ft^{2})	1 x IMAX single-laser (CoLa) (4K); 1 x traditional 15/70mm IMAX projector; 1 x Christie (4K) Laser projector; 1 x Century JJ 35mm/70mm projector	IMAX 12ch; Dolby Digital; DTS
Science Museum	IMAX: The Ronson Theatre	247 m^{2} (2,660 ft^{2})	319 m^{2} (3,430 ft^{2})	2 x IMAX Laser (4K each); 1 x traditional 15/70mm IMAX projector	IMAX 12ch
Cineworld, the O2	Superscreen #11	200 m^{2} (2,200 ft^{2})	160 m^{2} (1,700 ft^{2})	1 x Christie 2K or 4K (?)	Dolby Atmos
Cineworld (Empire) Leicester Square	Superscreen	170 m^{2} (1,800 ft^{2})	220 m^{2} (2,400 ft^{2})	2 x Barco DP4K-32B (4K each)	Dolby Atmos
VUE Stratford	Xtreme Screen #5/6/7/17	140 m^{2} (1,500 ft^{2})	180 m^{2} (1,900 ft^{2})	2 x Sony SRX-R515DS (4K each)	Dolby Digital 6.1

== See also ==
- Cardboard City (previous name of site)
- IMAX Melbourne
