= Inner Harbour ferry services =

Inner Harbour
- Locale: Darling Harbour, Mosman, North Sydney, Sydney
- Transit type: Commuter ferry
- Fleet: First Fleet
- Owner: Sydney Ferries
- Operator: Transdev Sydney Ferries
- No. of terminals: 14

Inner Harbour ferry services was a name used for ferry services connecting suburbs on the foreshore of the inner Sydney Harbour with Circular Quay by commuter ferry. Since 2017 this name is no longer used and all services have reverted to individual names

== Current Services ==
- Neutral Bay F5 services - Circular Quay, Kirribilli, North Sydney, Neutral Bay and Kurraba Point
- Mosman F6 services - Circular Quay, Cremorne Point, South Mosman, Old Cremorne and Mosman Bay

== Past Services ==
- Darling Harbour services - Circular Quay, Milsons Point, McMahon Point, Balmain East, Barangaroo and Pyrmont Bay

In October 2017 this was reorganised to become the Cross Harbour ferry services which are no longer considered part of the Inner Harbour services.

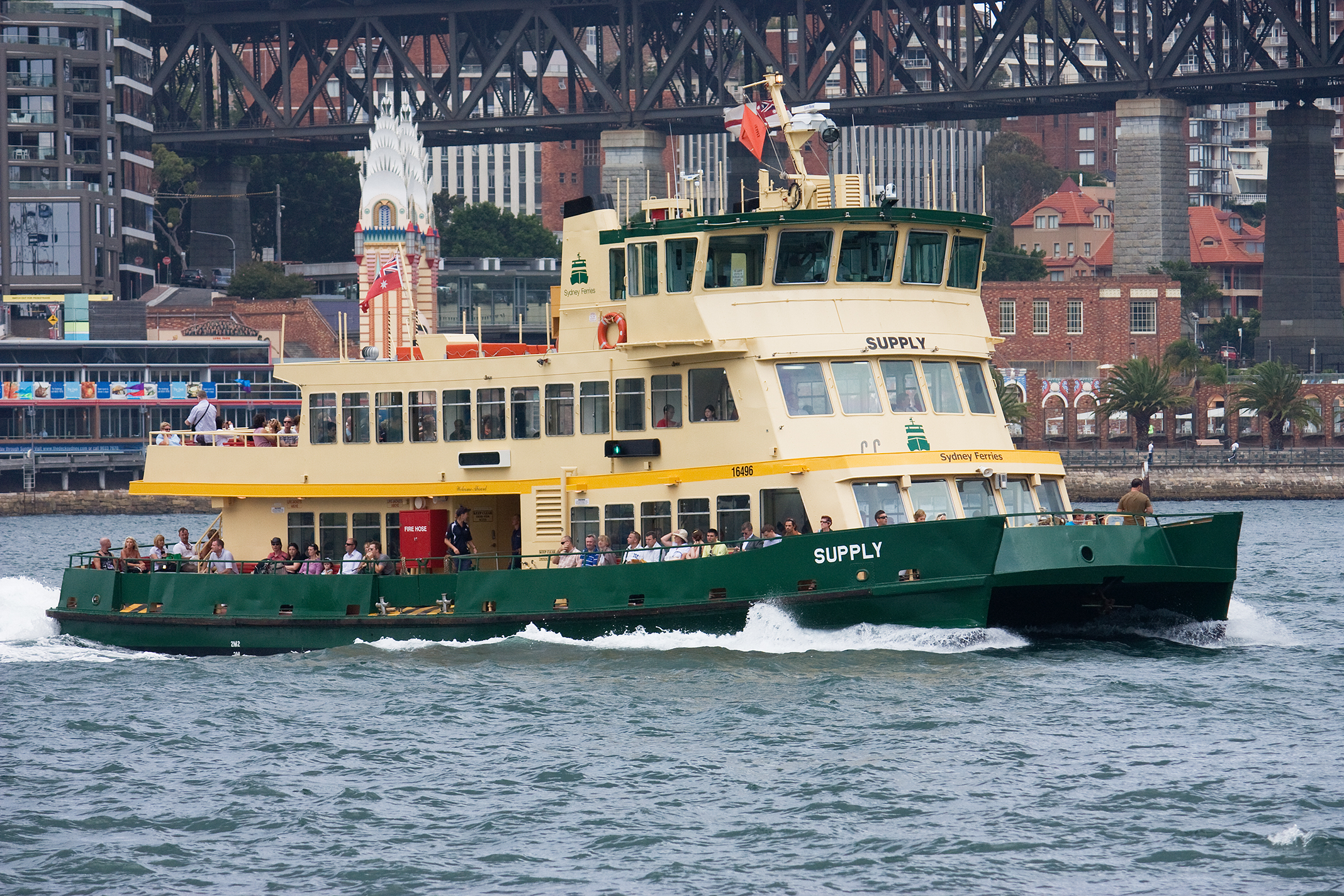
Sydney Ferry Supply

== Patronage ==
The following chart shows the relative patronage of Sydney Ferries' seven lines in the 2016-17 financial year.

== Gallery ==
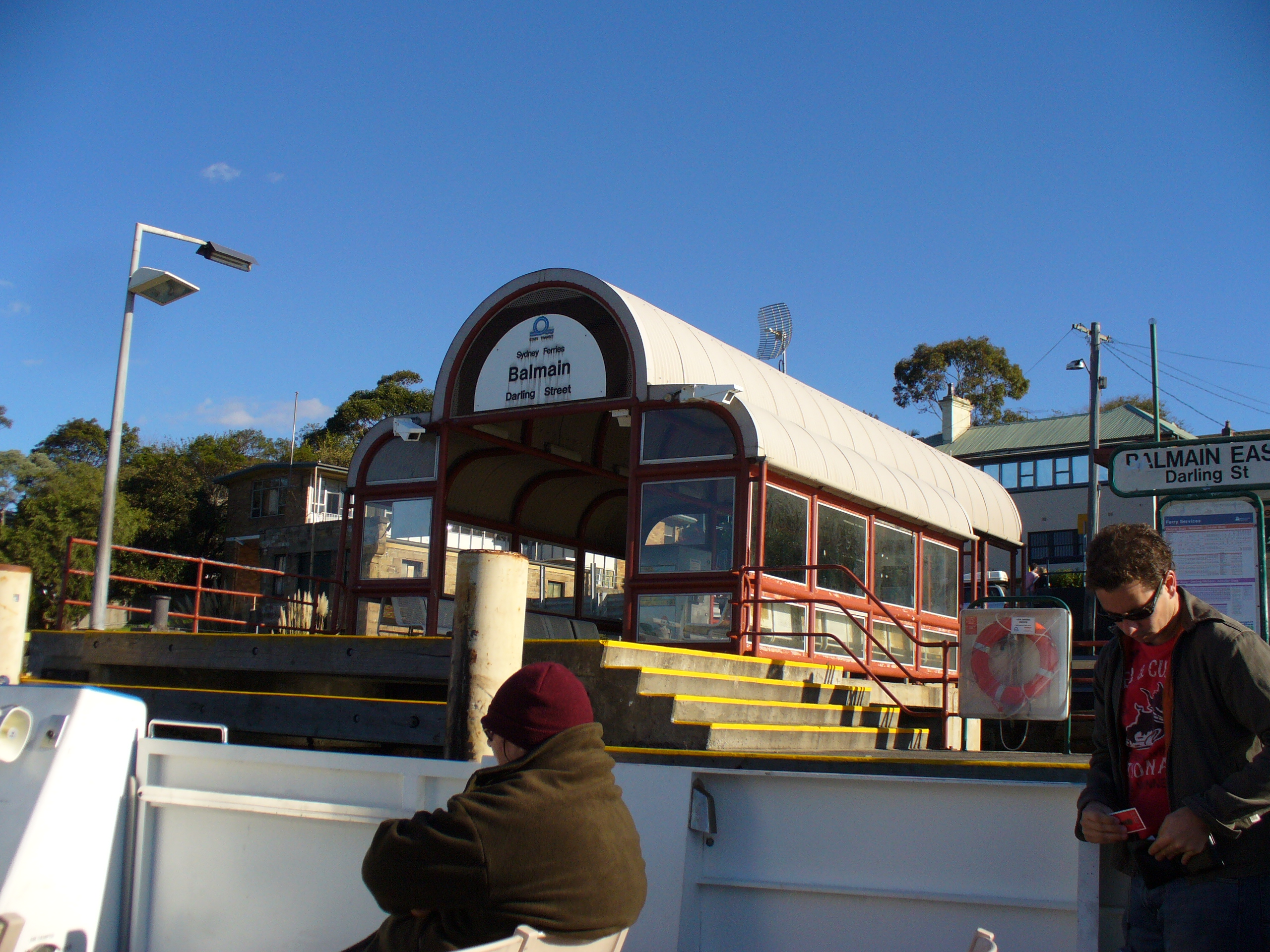
Passengers on a ferry at Balmain East wharf

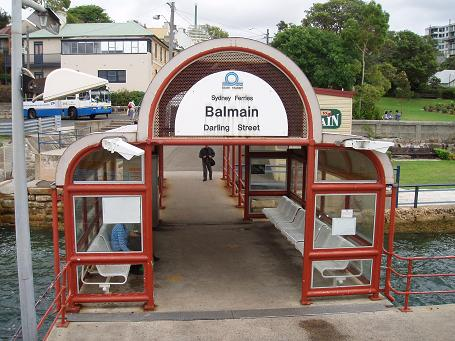
Balmain East (Darling Street) Wharf

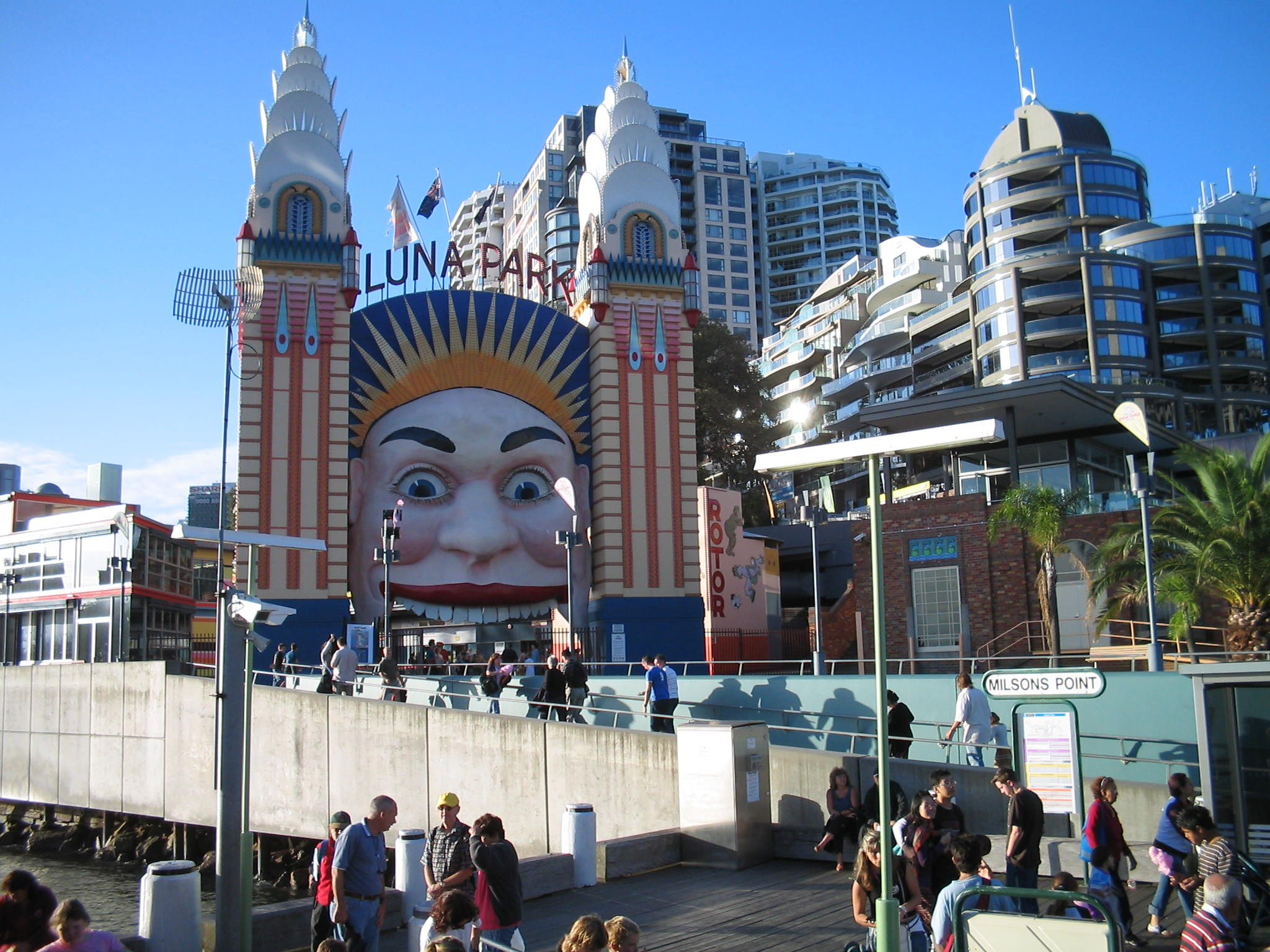
Milsons Point wharf serves as a gateway to Luna Park

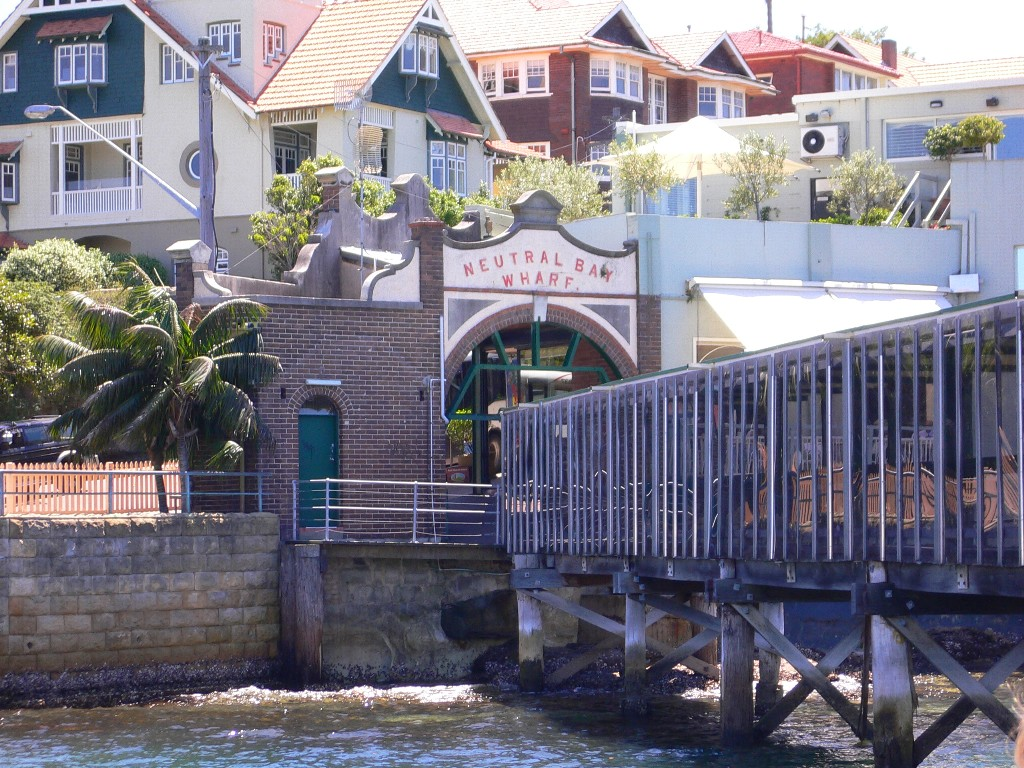
Neutral Bay Wharf

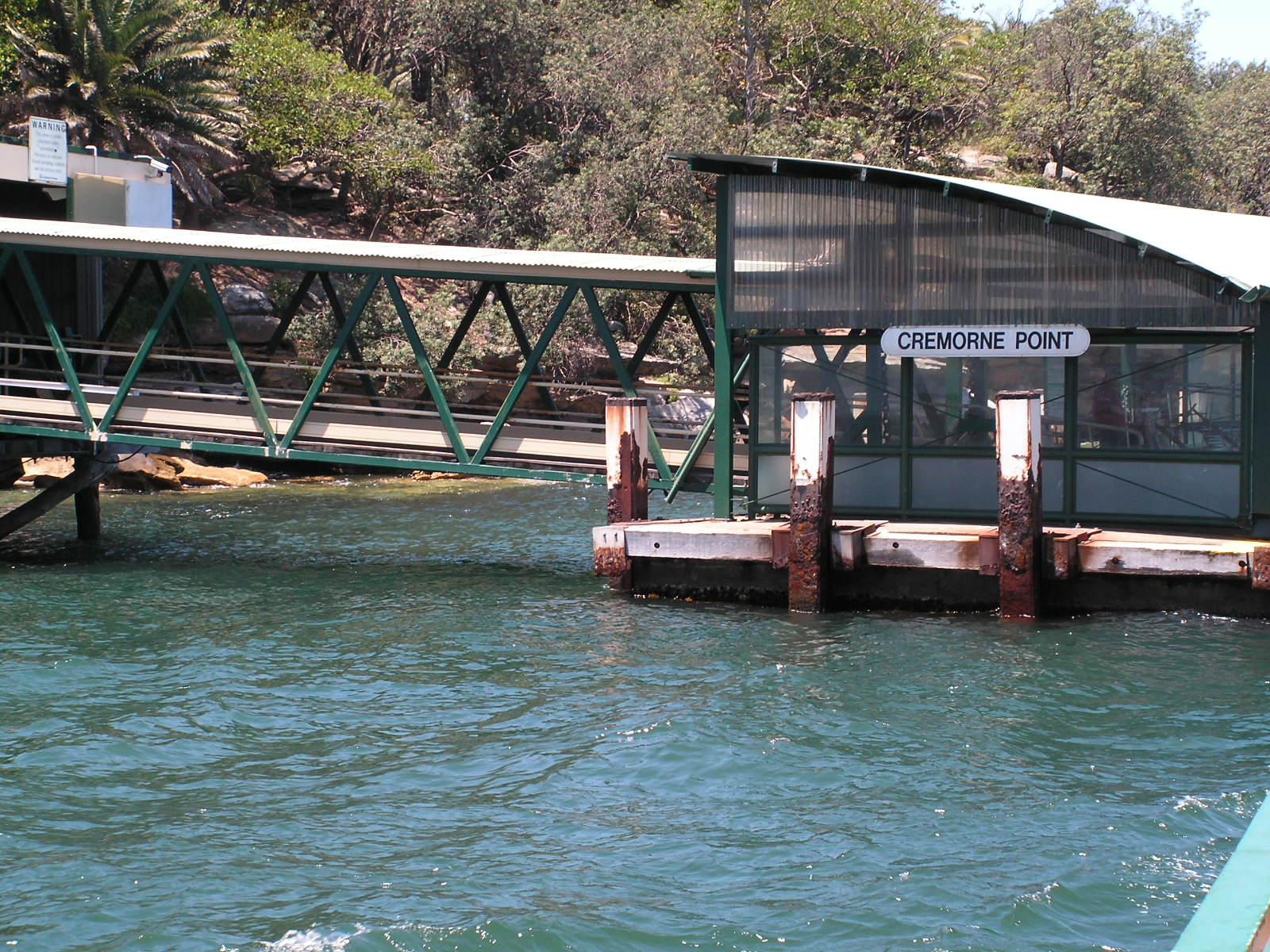
Cremorne Point Wharf
