= Belle Island =

Belle Island may refer to:

- Belle Island (Andaman and Nicobar Islands)
- Belle Island (Wisconsin)
- Belle Island (Kingston, Ontario)

== See also ==
- Bell Island (disambiguation)
- Belle Isle (disambiguation)
- Belleisle (disambiguation)
