= Inner Harbour =

Inner Harbor or Inner Harbour may refer to:

== Antarctica ==
- Inner Harbor (Antarctica)

== Australia ==
- Inner Harbour ferry services, Sydney, New South Wales
- Inner Harbour, Fremantle Harbour, Western Australia
- Inner Harbour, Port River, Port Adelaide, South Australia

== Canada ==
- Inner Harbour of Victoria Harbour, British Columbia
- Inner Harbour of Toronto Harbour
- Inner Harbour, Kingston, Ontario

== China ==
- Haikou New Port, Hainan, formerly called Inner Harbour

== Denmark ==
- Inner Harbour, Copenhagen, the oldest and most central part of the Port of Copenhagen

== Germany ==
- Duisburg Inner Harbour

== United States ==
- Inner Harbor Navigation Canal, New Orleans, Louisiana
- Inner Harbor, Baltimore, Maryland
  - Inner Harbor East, Baltimore, Maryland
- Boston Inner Harbor, Boston Harbor, Massachusetts
- Inner Harbor, Syracuse, New York
