= Belleisle =

Belleisle or Belle Île may refer to:

== Places ==
In New Brunswick

- Belleisle, New Brunswick, an informal geographic region in the lower Saint John River valley
- Belleisle Bay, a fjord-like branch of the St. John River
- Belleisle Creek, New Brunswick, a community in Kings County

Elsewhere

- Belleisle, Nova Scotia, a community in Annapolis County
- Belle Isle Castle, a castle in County Fermanagh, Northern Ireland
- Belle Île, a French island off the coast of Brittany

== Ships ==
- Belleisle Bay Ferry, a cable ferry in New Brunswick
- Belleisle-class ironclad, a British ship class of two ironclads
- HMS Belleisle, three ships of the Royal Navy

== See also ==
- Belle Isle (disambiguation)
- Belle Island (disambiguation)
- Bell Island (disambiguation)
