= Bull Island (disambiguation) =

Bull Island is an island located in Dublin Bay in Ireland.

Bull Island or Bulls Island or Bull's Island may also refer to the following:

== Places ==
- Bull Island (Antarctica), see Kemp Rock

=== United States ===
- Bull Island (California)
- Bull Island, Illinois, location of the 1972 Erie Canal Soda Pop Festival
- Bull Island (Dukes County, Massachusetts)
- Bull Island (Essex County, Massachusetts), an island of Massachusetts
- Bull Island (Montana), an island in Flathead Lake
- Bulls Island (Delaware River), an island in Hunterdon County, New Jersey
  - Bulls Island Recreation Area
- Bull Island (South Carolina), formerly called Bulls Island, part of Cape Romain National Wildlife Refuge
- Poquoson, Virginia, informally known as Bull Island

== Other ==
- Bull Island (TV series), a satirical RTÉ television and radio series

== See also ==
- Bell Island (disambiguation)
- Buol Island, Indonesia
- Bulla Island, in the Caspian Sea
