= Kirribilli ferry wharf =

Ferry wharf in Sydney, Australia

Kirribilli
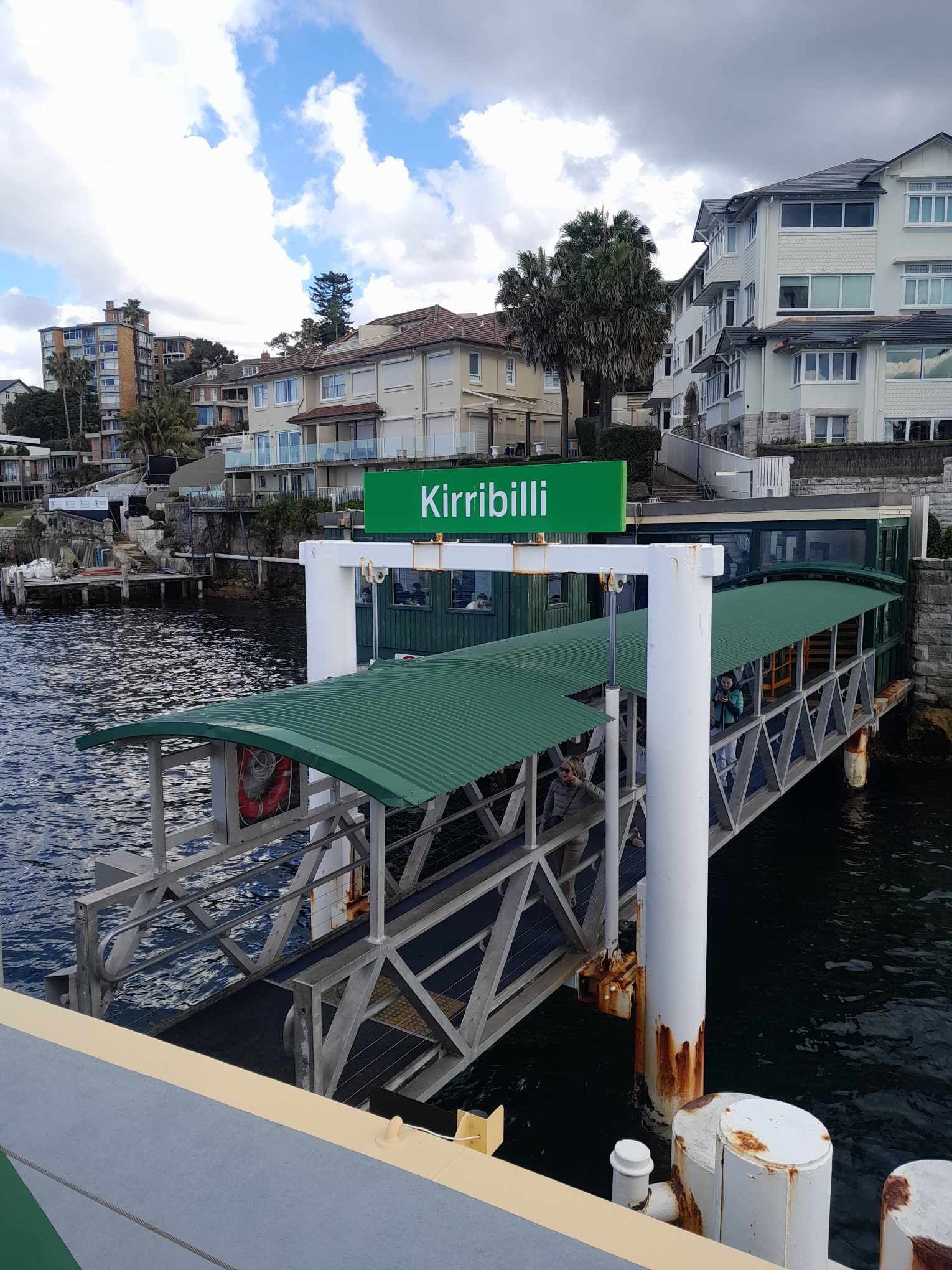
- Wharf in 2024.

General information
- Location: Holbrook Avenue, Kirribilli; New South Wales; Australia
- Coordinates: 33°50′58″S 151°13′13″E
- Owner: Transport for NSW
- Operator: Transdev Sydney Ferries
- Platforms: 1 wharf (1 berth)
- Connections: Carabella St at Peel St

Construction
- Accessible: Yes

Other information
- Status: Unstaffed

History
- Former names: North Sydney, Kirribilli (–2002)

Services
Preceding wharf	Sydney Ferries	Following wharf
Circular Quay Terminus	F5 Neutral Bay	North Sydney towards Neutral Bay
Circular Quay Terminus	F5 Neutral Bay	Kurraba Point One-way operation
Location

Kirribilli ferry wharf is located on the northern side of Sydney Harbour serving the North Sydney Council suburb of Kirribilli. It is served by Sydney Ferries Neutral Bay services operating between Circular Quay and Neutral Bay. The single wharf is served by First Fleet class ferries.

== Wharves and services ==
Platform	Line	Stopping pattern	Notes
1	F5	Circular Quay to Neutral Bay	

== Connections ==
Busways operates one bus route via Kirribilli wharf, under contract to Transport for NSW:

- 269: to McMahons Point wharf
