= Best Island =

Island in New Zealand

- Interactive map of Best Island

Geography
- Location: Tasman Bay / Te Tai-o-Aorere
- Coordinates: 41.294°S 173.155°E
- Area: 1.32 km^{2} (0.51 sq mi)
- Length: 3.7 km (2.3 mi)
- Width: 0.7 km (0.43 mi)

Administration
- New Zealand
- District: Tasman District
- Ward: Richmond Ward

Demographics
- Population: 88 (2023)
- Pop. density: 67/km^{2} (174/sq mi)

Best Island, previously Bests Island, is an island in the Waimea Inlet, an arm in the southernmost part of Tasman Bay / Te Tai-o-Aorere, on the northern coast of New Zealand's South Island. The island runs northwest to southeast for 3.7 kilometres (2.3 mi). It is connected to the South Island on the southwest and to Bell Island to the northeast by causeways. It is in the Richmond Ward of Tasman District.

The northeastern half of the island contains the Greenacres Golf Club. The middle of the island contains farms. The population is concentrated at the southwestern end. Legal access to properties is only from the sea, although private roads have been used for decades to give property-owners access. A plan for the district council to buy land for public road access failed in 2016.

The island was originally called Bests (or Best's) Island after a local family.

== Demographics ==
These islands are contained in the statistical area Islands Tasman District, which covers 15.94 km^{2} (6.15 sq mi) and also includes the sparsely populated Moturoa / Rabbit Island, Bell Island and Rough Island. The statistical area had an estimated population of 90 as of June 2025, with a population density of 5.6 people per km^{2}. Best Island contains almost the entire population of the area, with the population being 88 in 2023.

Historical population
Year	Pop.	±% p.a.
2006	93	—
2013	96	+0.45%
2018	102	+1.22%
2023	90	−2.47%

Islands Tasman District had a population of 90 in the 2023 New Zealand census, a decrease of 12 people (−11.8%) since the 2018 census, and a decrease of 6 people (−6.2%) since the 2013 census. There were 48 males and 42 females in 51 dwellings. The median age was 55.3 years (compared with 38.1 years nationally). There were 9 people (10.0%) aged under 15 years, 12 (13.3%) aged 15 to 29, 45 (50.0%) aged 30 to 64, and 21 (23.3%) aged 65 or older.

People could identify as more than one ethnicity. The results were 96.7% European (Pākehā), and 3.3% Māori. English was spoken by 100.0%, and other languages by 3.3%. The percentage of people born overseas was 20.0, compared with 28.8% nationally.

Religious affiliations were 30.0% Christian, and 3.3% other religions. People who answered that they had no religion were 60.0%, and 3.3% of people did not answer the census question.

Of those at least 15 years old, 24 (29.6%) people had a bachelor's or higher degree, 48 (59.3%) had a post-high school certificate or diploma, and 12 (14.8%) people exclusively held high school qualifications. The median income was $37,700, compared with $41,500 nationally. The employment status of those at least 15 was 45 (55.6%) full-time, 9 (11.1%) part-time, and 3 (3.7%) unemployed.
