= Neutral Bay ferry service =

Ferry route in Sydney, Australia

F5 Neutral Bay

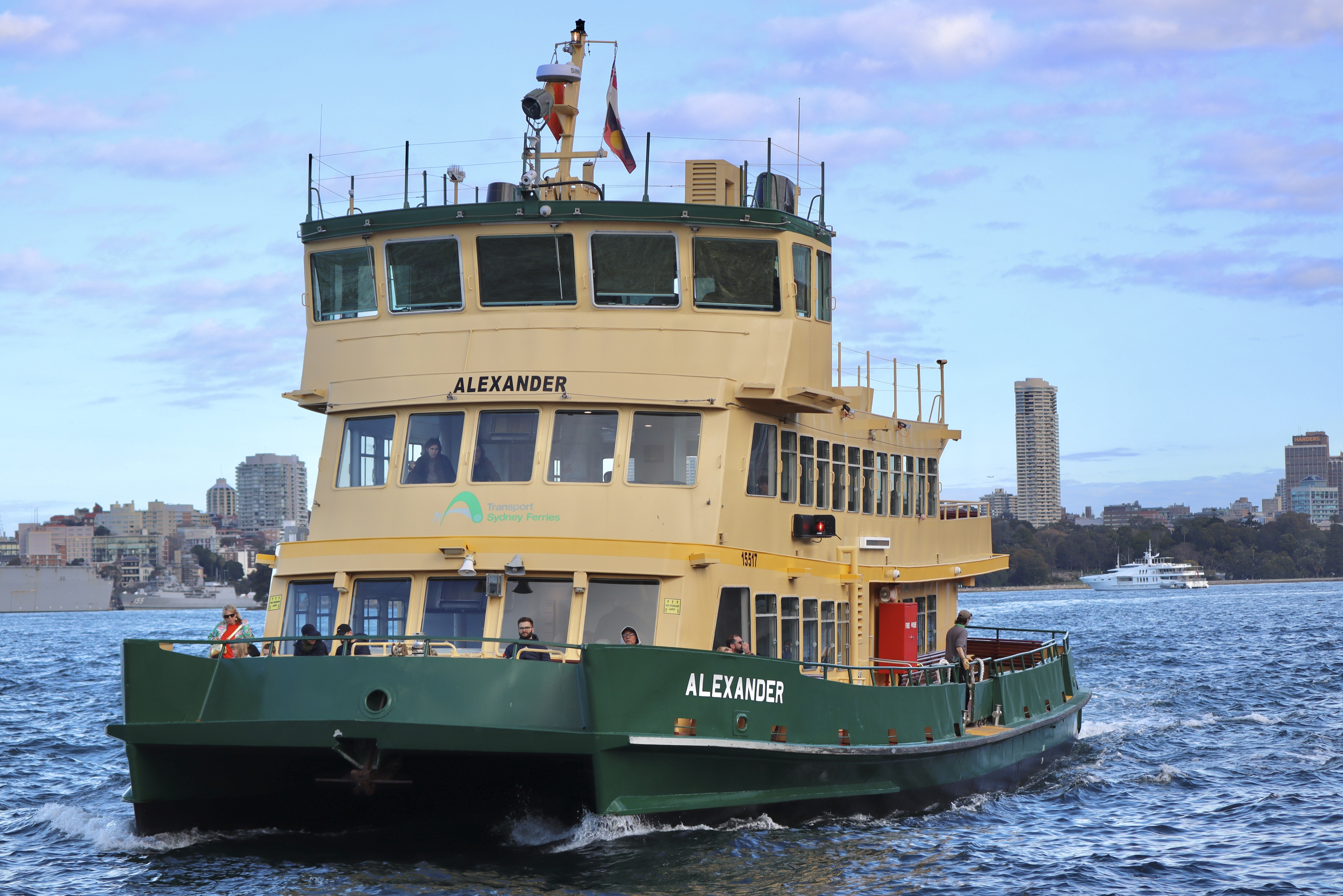
- MV Alexander approaching Kirribilli Wharf
- Locale: Sydney
- Transit type: Commuter ferry
- Fleet: First Fleet
- Owner: Sydney Ferries
- Operator: Transdev Sydney Ferries
- No. of terminals: 5

The Neutral Bay ferry service (numbered F5) is a commuter ferry route in Sydney, New South Wales, Australia. Part of the Sydney Ferries network, it serves several Lower North Shore suburbs around Neutral Bay.

Services begin on the southern side of Sydney Harbour at Circular Quay, then head northeast to Kirribilli. From there, services proceed in a loop, stopping at North Sydney, Neutral Bay and Kurraba Point. The journey is completed by returning to Kirribilli and Circular Quay. Services operate every half an hour on weekdays and every hour at night and on weekends.

== Wharves ==
=== Circular Quay ===
Circular Quay wharf is located at the northern end of the Sydney central business district. The locality of Circular Quay is a major Sydney transport hub, with a large ferry, rail and bus interchange.

=== Kirribilli ===
Transfer
269 bus route
Location
33°50′57.79″S 151°13′12.96″E

Kirribilli ferry wharf is located near Holbrook Avenue in Kirribilli. It consists of a single wharf.

=== North Sydney ===
Transfer
None
Location
33°50′42″S 151°13′07″E

North Sydney ferry wharf (also known as High Street wharf) is located at the end of High Street, North Sydney and serves the eastern part of the suburb. It consists of a single wharf.

=== Neutral Bay ===
Transfer
225 bus route
Location
33°50′32″S 151°13′10″E

Neutral Bay ferry wharf is located at the end of Hayes Street, Neutral Bay. It consists of a single wharf.

The wharf was rebuilt between February and August 2012.

=== Kurraba Point ===
Transfer
None
Location
33°50′36″S 151°13′18″E

Kurraba Point ferry wharf is located near Kurraba Road in Kurraba Point. It consists of a single wharf.

== Patronage ==
The following table shows the patronage of Sydney Ferries network for the year 2025.

2025 Sydney Ferries annual patronage by line (Note: Figures based on Opal tap on and tap off data)
F1	6,747,745	View source data.
F2	1,546,710	View source data.
F3	2,485,544	View source data.
F4	2,715,673	View source data.
F5	561,321	View source data.
F6	704,576	View source data.
F7	248,347	View source data.
F8	497,533	View source data.
F9	1,658,217	View source data.
