= Bell Island =

Bell Island may refer to:

== North America ==
=== Canada ===
- Bell Island (Newfoundland and Labrador), Canada, an island in Conception Bay
  - Bell Island (electoral district), a provincial electoral district which represented the island in the Newfoundland House of Assembly from 1956 to 1975, now part of Conception Bay East–Bell Island
- Bell Island (Grey Islands), Canada, one of the Grey Islands, off Newfoundland's Great Northern Peninsula

=== Elsewhere in North America ===
- Bell Island (The Bahamas), and island part of the Lucayan Archipelago
- Bell Island (Alaska), U.S.

== Other places ==
- Bell Island (Franz Josef Land), Russia
- Bell Island (New Zealand), in Waimea Inlet, part of Tasman Bay

== See also ==
- Belle Island (disambiguation)
- Belle Isle (disambiguation)
- Belleisle (disambiguation)
