= Kurraba Point ferry wharf =

Ferry wharf in Sydney, Australia

Kurraba Point
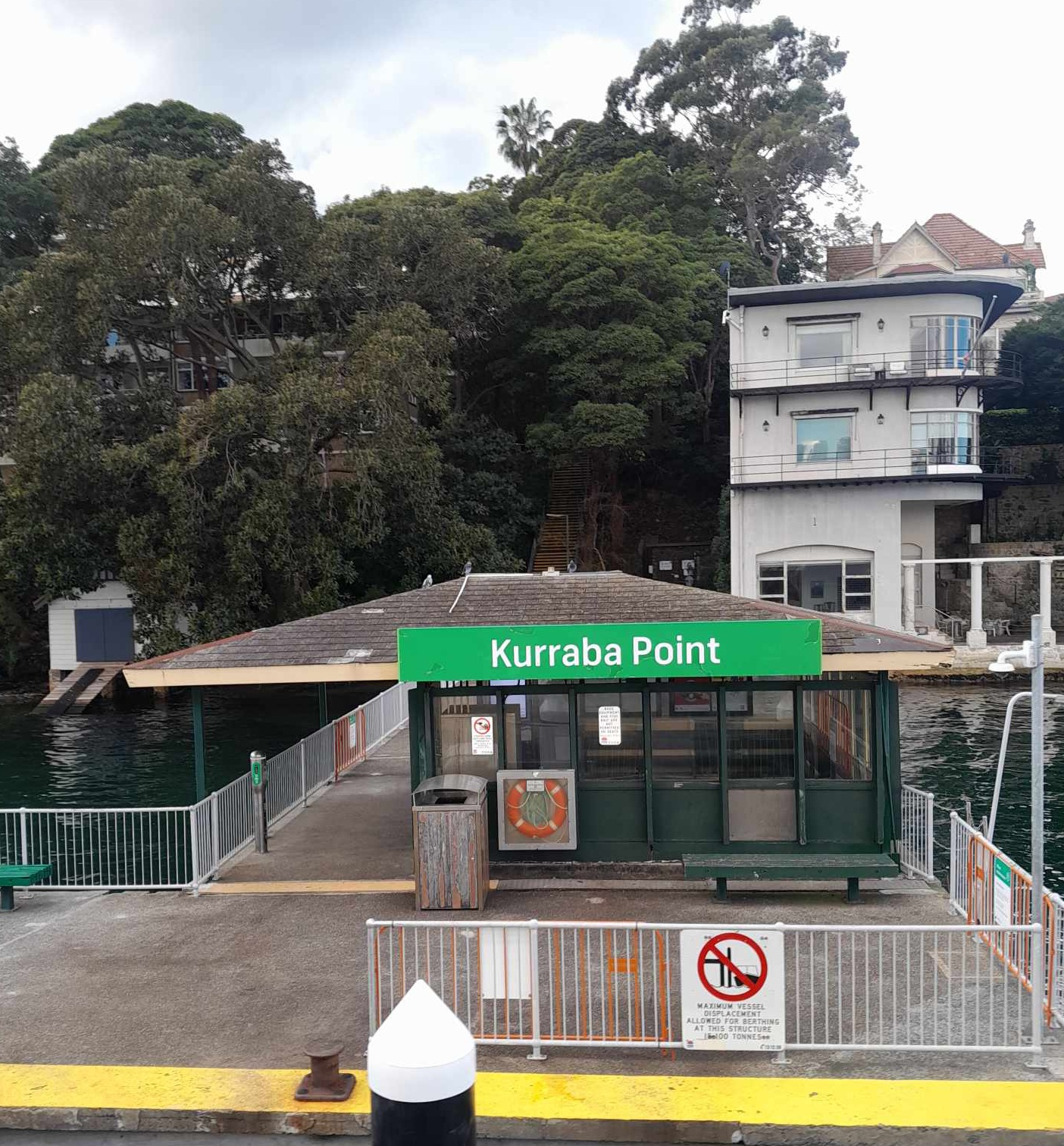
- Wharf in June 2024

General information
- Location: Kurraba Road, Kurraba Point; New South Wales; Australia
- Coordinates: 33°50′36″S 151°13′18″E
- Owner: Transport for NSW
- Operator: Transdev Sydney Ferries
- Platforms: 1 wharf (1 berth)

Other information
- Status: Unstaffed

History
- Former names: Kurraba Point, Neutral Bay (–2002)

Services
Preceding wharf	Sydney Ferries	Following wharf
Kirribilli towards Circular Quay	F5 Neutral Bay	Neutral Bay One-way operation
Location

Kurraba Point ferry wharf is located on the northern side of Sydney Harbour serving the suburb of Kurraba Point.

Located immediately adjacent to the wharf is the "Once Upon a Time" residence built by William Crowle, originally part of the Wyldefel Gardens complex on the other side of the harbour and transported over brick-by-brick by Crowle in 1936 when the Royal Australian Navy claimed the land to build the Garden Island navy base.

== Wharves and services ==
Kurraba Point wharf is served by Sydney Ferries Neutral Bay services operated by First Fleet class ferries.

Platform	Line	Stopping pattern	Notes
1	F5	Circular Quay to Neutral Bay	
