= Belle Isle =

Belle Isle may refer to:

== Places ==
=== Canada ===
- Belle Isle (Newfoundland and Labrador), an island between Labrador and Newfoundland
  - Strait of Belle Isle, in which the island is situated

=== England ===
- Belle Isle Junction on the East Coast Main Line, where the Canal Tunnels diverge
- Belle Isle, Leeds, West Yorkshire
- Belle Isle (Windermere), an island in Lake District, Cumbria
- Belle Isle Park (Exeter), a small park in Exeter, Devon

=== France ===
- Belle Isle (Brittany)

=== Ireland ===
- Belle Isle Castle, a castle in County Fermanagh, Northern Ireland

=== United States ===
- Belle Isle, Florida, an inland town in central Florida
- Bell Isle (Louisiana)
- Belle Isle (Miami Beach), an artificial island in Biscayne Bay
- Belle Isle, a small island in Isle Royale National Park, Michigan
- Belle Isle Marsh Reservation, parkland near Boston
- Belle Isle Park, in Detroit, Michigan
- Belle Isle State Park (Virginia), along the Rappahannock River in Lancaster, Virginia
- Belle Isle (Lancaster, Virginia), a historic plantation house surrounded by Belle Isle State Park
- Belle Isle (Richmond, Virginia), an island and public city park in the James River

== People ==
- Charles Louis Auguste Fouquet, duc de Belle-Isle (1684–1761), French general and statesman
- Louis Charles Armand Fouquet, chevalier de Belle-Isle (1693–1747), French general and brother of the former

== Music ==
- Belle Isle, a 2009 album by MoZella
- "Belle Isle", a song by Bob Dylan from Self Portrait

== See also ==
- Bell Island (disambiguation)
- Belle Île
- Belleisle (disambiguation)
- Belle Island (disambiguation)
- Detroit Belle Isle Grand Prix, an IndyCar Series race weekend held at Belle Isle in Detroit, Michigan
