= Inner Harbour, Kingston =

Coordinates: 44.2395°N 76.4876°W

Inner Harbour
- Neighbourhood
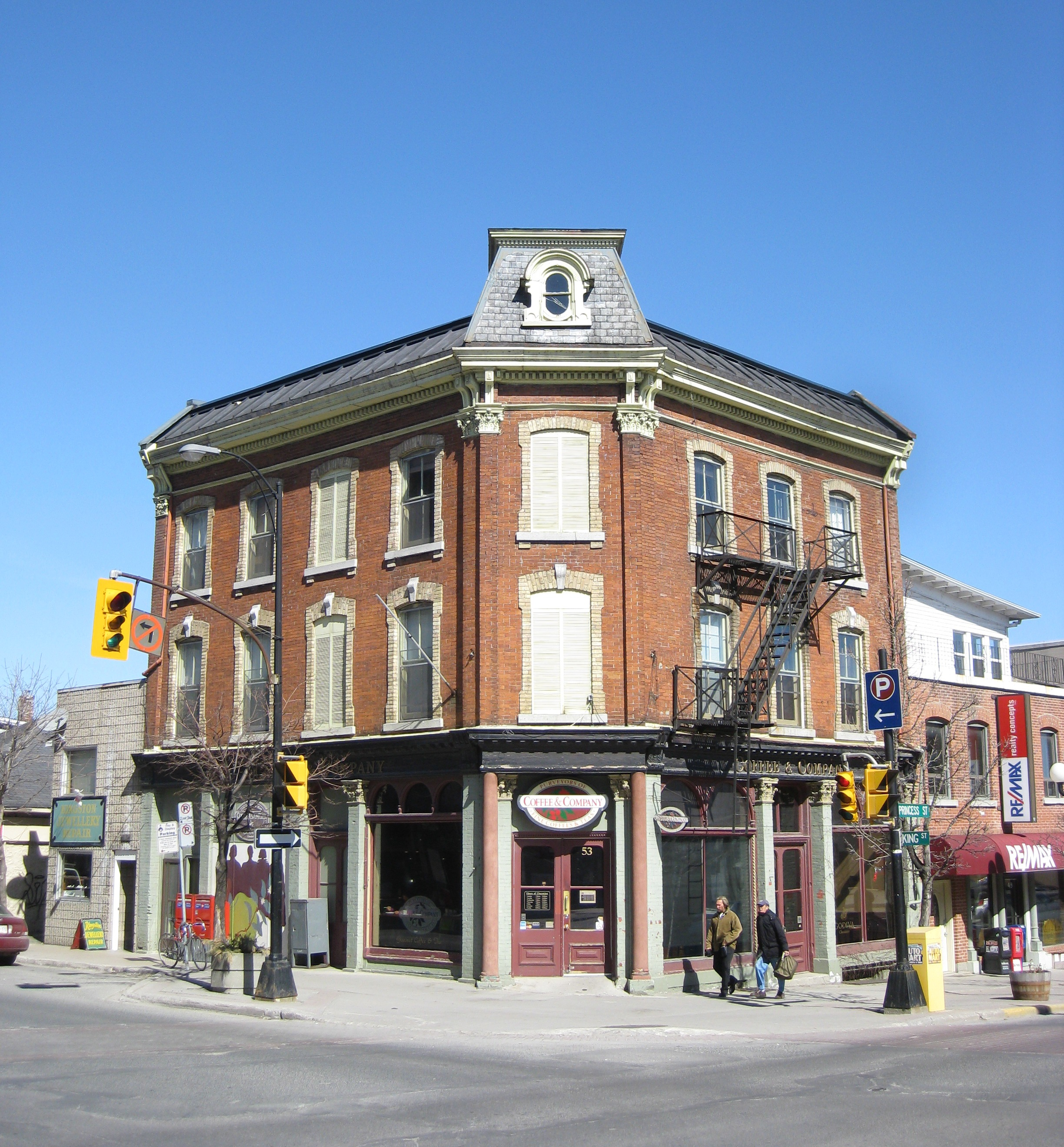
- Historic Commercial Building at King & Princess Streets
- Interactive map of Inner Harbour
- Country: Canada
- Province: Ontario
- City: Kingston, Ontario

Population
  - Total: 3,672
- Time zone: UTC-5 (Eastern Time Zone)
  - Summer (DST): UTC-4 (Eastern Time Zone)
- Postal code: K7L
- Area code: 613

Inner Harbour is a neighbourhood located in downtown Kingston, Ontario, Canada. The Inner Harbour district is bounded by Joseph Street to the north, Princess Street to the south, Division Street on the west and the Cataraqui River on the east. The area is within the King's Town District. The District is represented on Kingston City Council by Councillor Rob Hutchison for the 2010-14 term of office.

The average family income for the area is $45,715 which is lower than the city average. The Inner Harbour area consists primarily of working-class families with commercial activity focused primarily along Princess and Queen Streets on the south side of the neighbourhood.

In the past the demographics of the Inner Harbour in addition to other north Kingston neighbourhoods contributed to local negativity toward living "north of Princess". The term refers to areas located on the north side of Princess Street, which is the main east–west thoroughfare through Kingston, and runs the length of the city as it is Highway 2 through town. In recent years the socio-demographic nature of this area has changed as increasing levels of gentrification and some studentification (the social and environmental changes caused by increasing numbers of post-secondary students living in a particular urban area) has taken place in some of these neighbourhoods.

The areas proximity to downtown Kingston means it has many good examples of 19th century heritage buildings constructed of local limestone. It is also home to Leon's Centre, a large venue entertainment and sporting arena. The La Salle Causeway which enters the Inner Harbour neighbourhood at the foot of Ontario Street is also the main link between Kingston and its eastern suburbs. It consists of three bridges, one of which is a lift bridge allowing boats access to the Cataraqui River, Inner Harbour and Rideau Canal system linking Kingston with Ottawa.

== Notable attractions ==
St. Andrew's Presbyterian Church at Princess & Clergy Streets

- Slush Puppie Place
- The Princess of Wales' Own Regiment
- Providence Continuing Care Centre
- Wolfe Island Ferry Terminal
- St. Andrew's Presbyterian Church
- Belle Park

== Education ==
- Central Public School
- St. Patrick Catholic School
- KCVI Street Smart Community Education Centre
