= North Sydney ferry wharf =

Ferry wharf in North Sydney

North Sydney
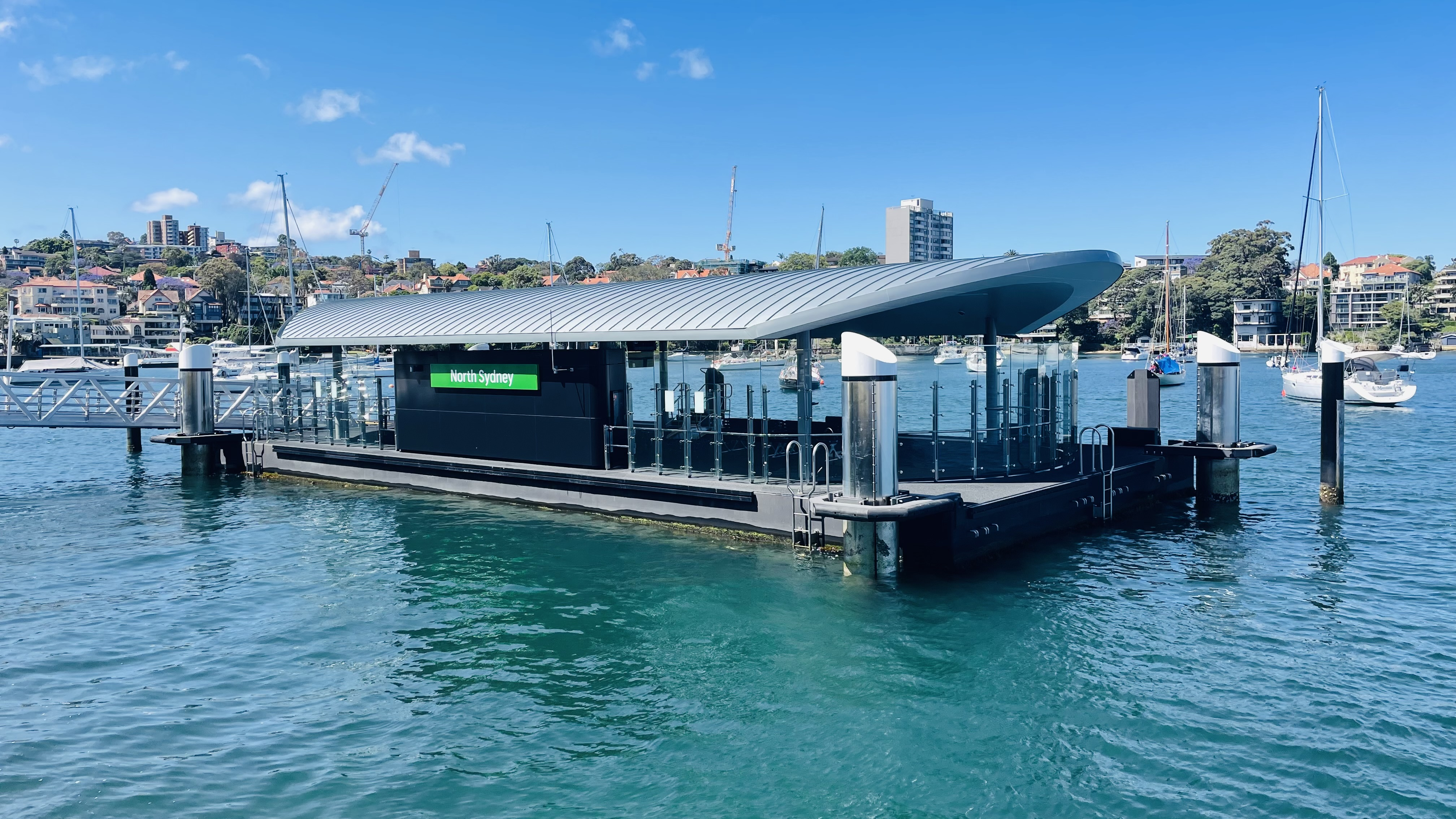
- The new ferry wharf in November 2022

General information
- Location: High Street, North Sydney; New South Wales; Australia
- Coordinates: 33°50′42″S 151°13′07″E
- Owner: Transport for NSW
- Operator: Transdev Sydney Ferries
- Platforms: 1 wharf (1 berth)

Other information
- Status: Unstaffed

History
- Former names: North Sydney, High Street (–2002)

Services
Preceding wharf	Sydney Ferries	Following wharf
Kirribilli One-way operation	F5 Neutral Bay	Neutral Bay Terminus
Location

North Sydney ferry wharf (also known as High Street wharf) is located on the northern side of Sydney Harbour serving the Lower North Shore suburb of North Sydney.

In June 2022, a replacement wharf opened to the left of the original wharf, with upgraded facilities.

== Wharves and services ==
North Sydney wharf is served by Sydney Ferries Neutral Bay services operated by First Fleet class ferries.

Platform	Line	Stopping pattern	Notes
1	F5	Circular Quay to Neutral Bay	

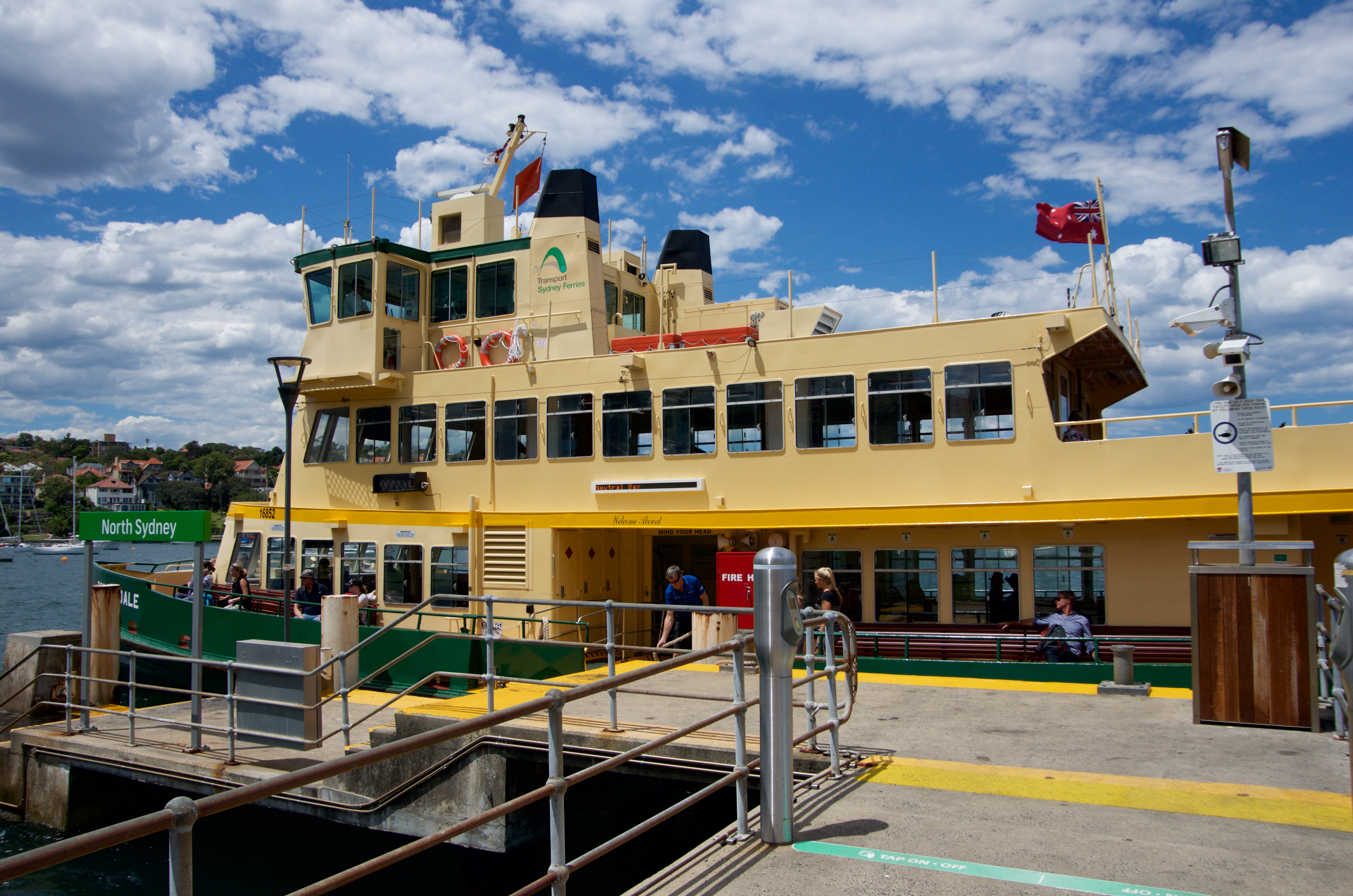
The ferry Borrowdale at original North Sydney ferry wharf in December 2017

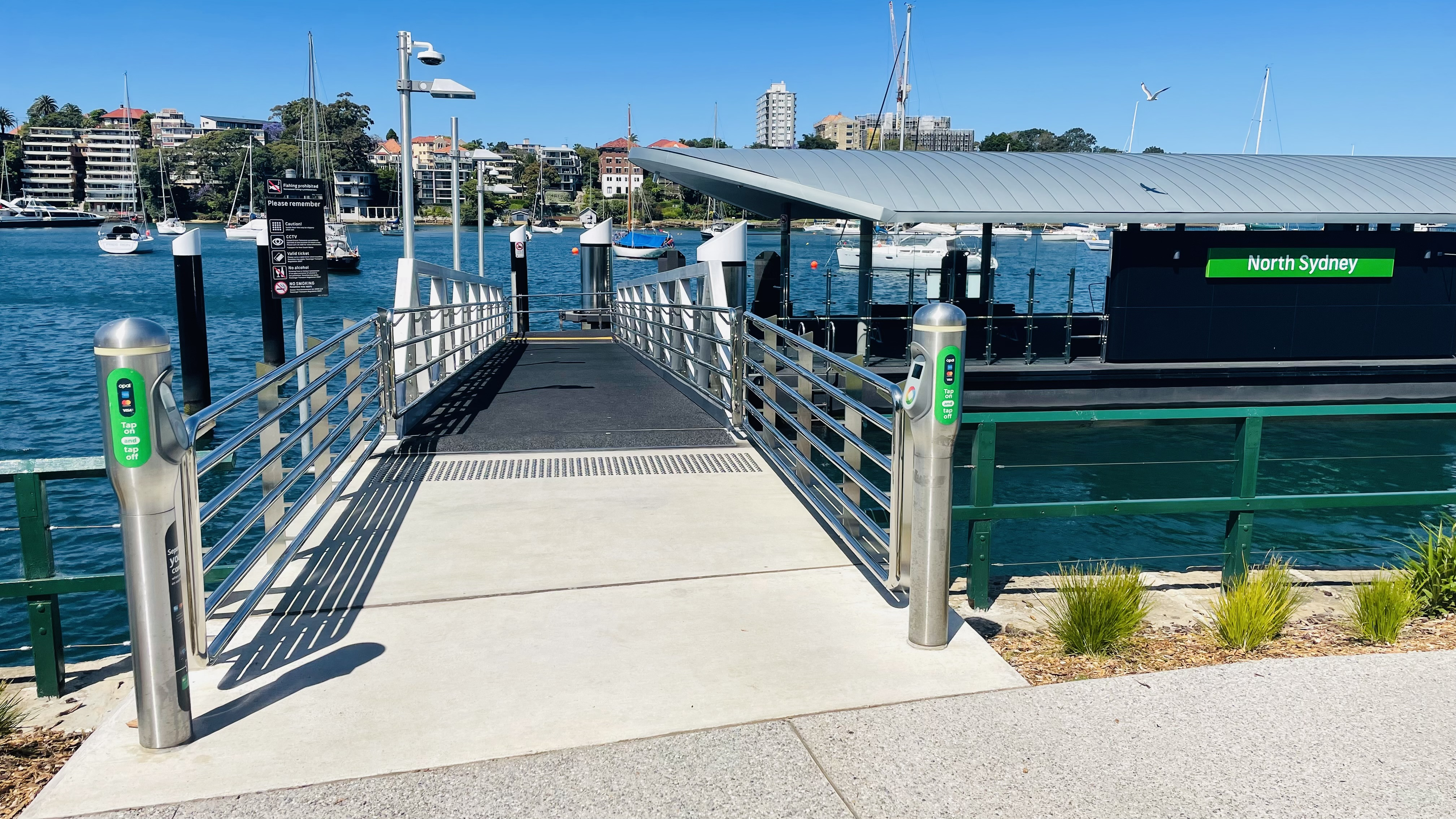
Walkway to the wharf

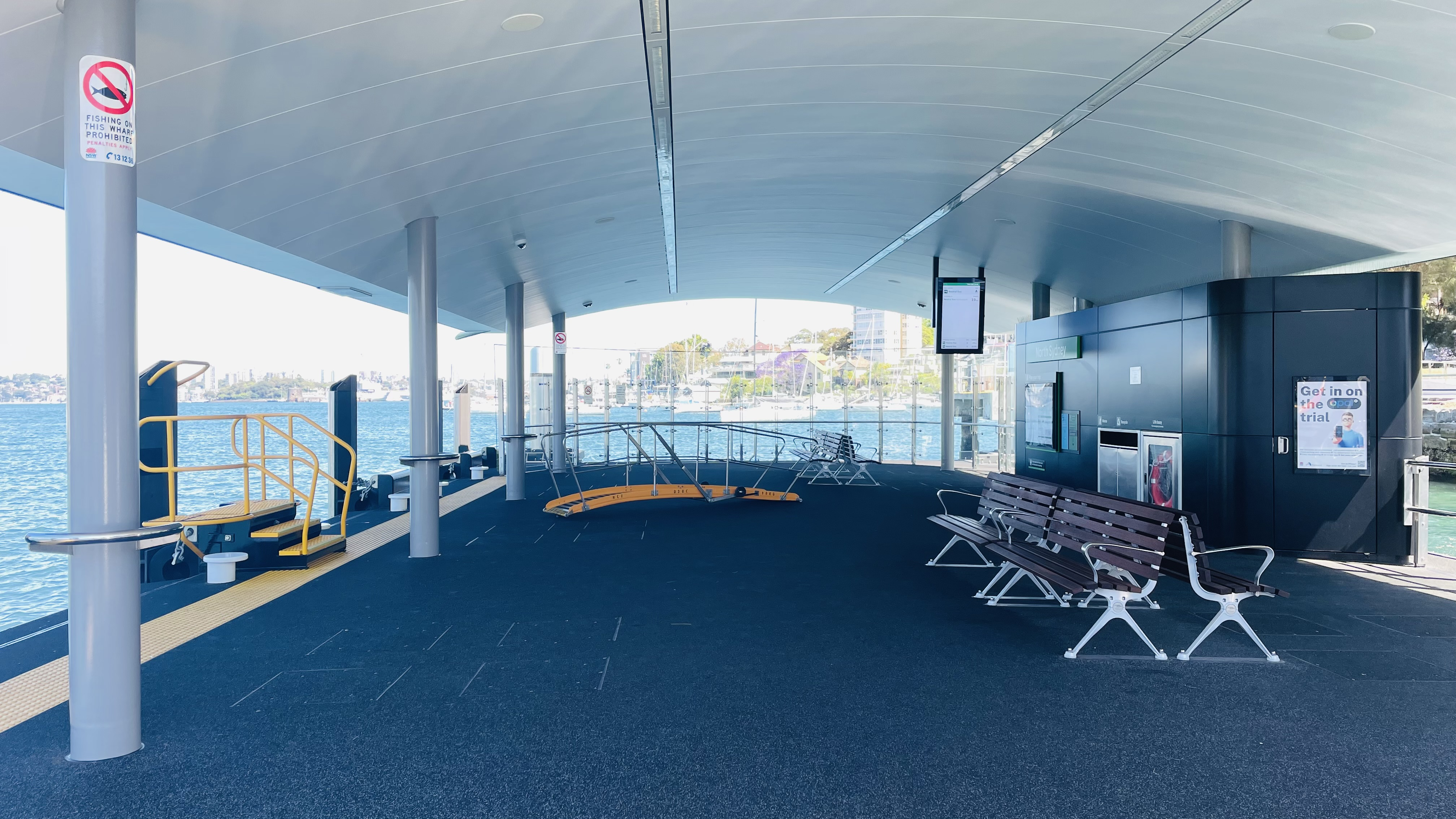
Waiting area

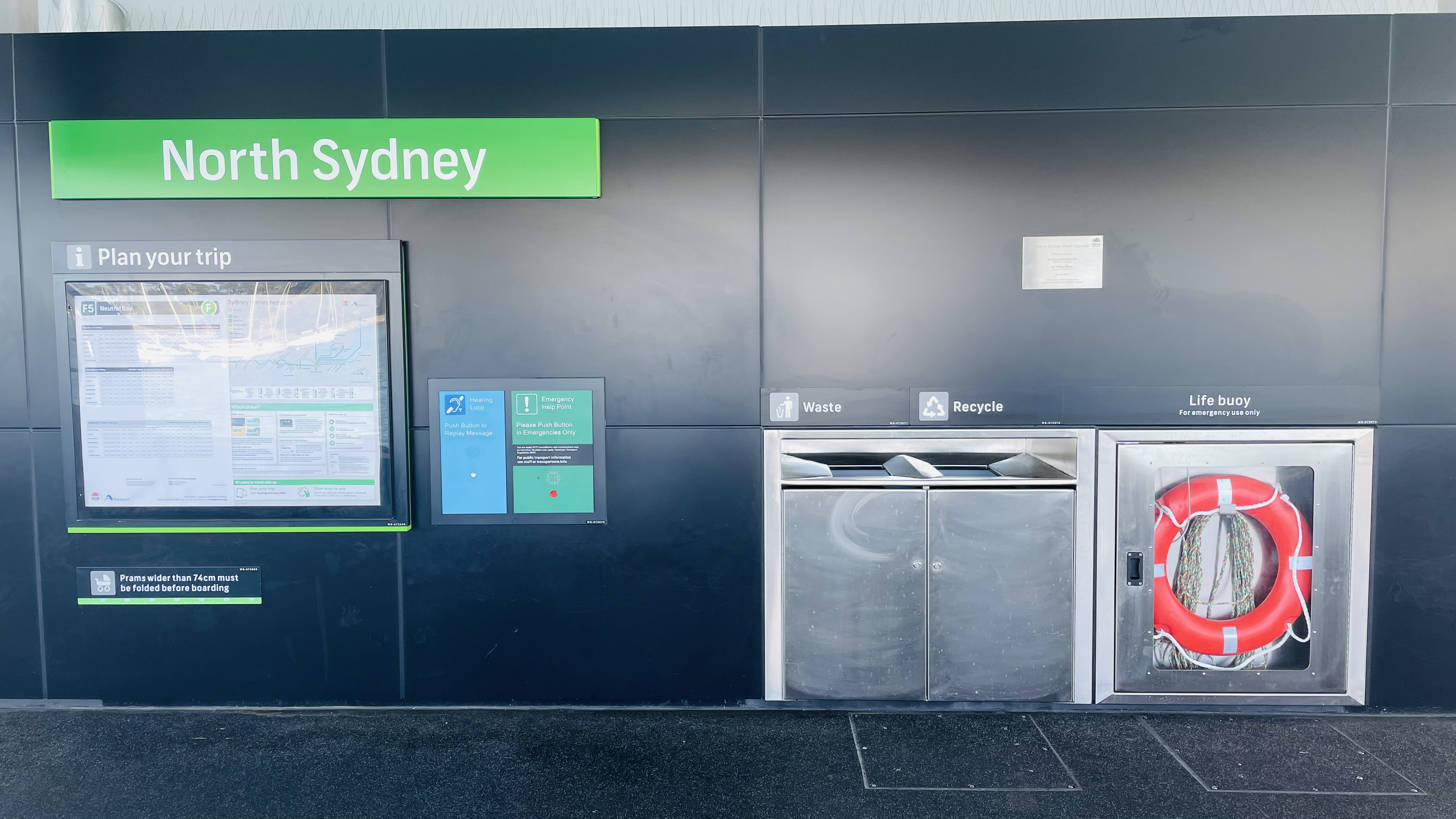
Wharf facilities
