= HMS Belleisle =

Three ships of the Royal Navy have been named HMS Belleisle after Belle Île off the coast of Brittany:

- HMS Belleisle (1761) was a 64-gun ship of the line of the French Navy, launched in 1760. Captured by the Royal Navy on 3 April 1761, and commissioned as the third-rate HMS Belleisle.
- HMS Belleisle (1795) was a French 74-gun third-rate ship of the line named Formidable captured in 1795 near Belle Île. She fought at the Battle of Trafalgar and was broken up in 1814.
- HMS Belleisle (1819) was a 74-gun third rate launched in 1819 and broken up in 1872.
- HMS Belleisle (1876) was the lead ship of her class of ironclad battleship, originally built for the Ottoman Empire as Peiki Shereef, but purchased in 1876, used as a coast defense ship and expended as a target ship in 1903.
- A destroyer named Belleisle was launched in 1946 but never completed.

== See also ==
- HMS Belle Isle
