= Waimea Inlet =

Estuary in New Zealand

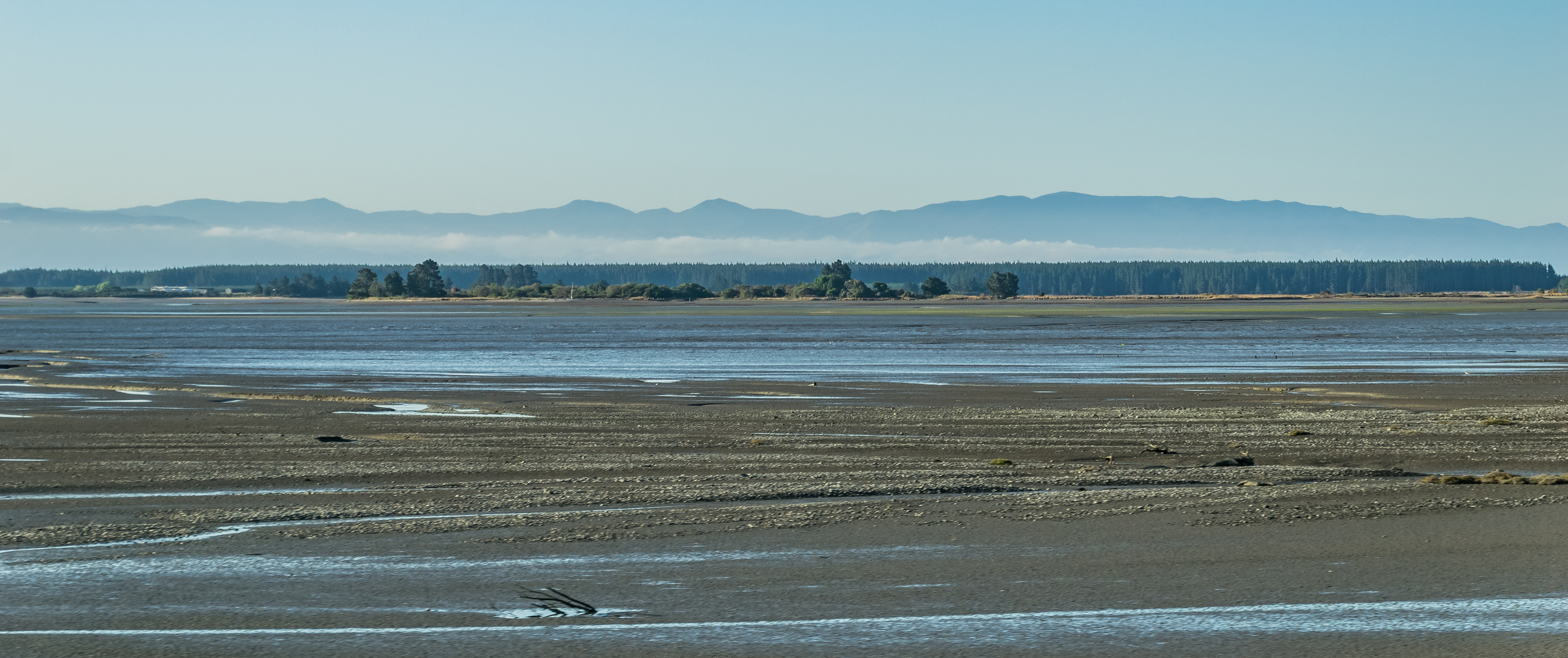
- Waimea Inlet at low tide, with tidal flats exposed

- Location in New Zealand
- Location: Tasman Bay / Te Tai-o-Aorere, South Island, New Zealand
- Coordinates: 41.304°S 173.193°E
- Type: Estuary
- Primary inflows: Waimea River
- Primary outflows: Tasman Bay
- Catchment area: 800 square kilometres (310 sq mi)
- Basin countries: New Zealand
- Surface area: 3,455 hectares (8,540 acres)
- Islands: 10, including Bell and Bests
- Settlements: Richmond, Stoke

Waimea Inlet is the largest estuary in the South Island of New Zealand, covering about 3,455 hectares (8,540 acres) at the southern end of Tasman Bay / Te Tai-o-Aorere. Shallow and bar-built, it lies behind Rabbit Island and contains 10 islands. The inlet is regarded as an area of outstanding biological value and is nationally important for wading birds, but its margins have been heavily modified since European settlement, with about 200 hectares lost to reclamation.

== Geography ==
Waimea Inlet took its present form over the last 6,000 years, after post-glacial sea levels rose and sediment was deposited as storm beach ridges across the Waimea Plains. It is a shallow bar-built estuary, open to Tasman Bay at the western (Mapua) and eastern (Nelson) ends of Rabbit Island. The sea enters twice daily, the tide rising between 2.6 and 4.2 m, and as much as 62 million m^{3} of water flows in on a spring tide; combined with the inlet's shallowness, this produces a relatively quick flushing.

The tidal area of about 3,455 hectares (8,540 acres) is dominated by intertidal flats (2,867 hectares (7,080 acres)), with 587 hectares (1,450 acres) of subtidal water and river channels; a further 466 hectares (1,150 acres) is made up of islands. Waimea Inlet is the largest single estuarine unit in the South Island and falls within the 10% of New Zealand estuaries larger than 1,700 hectares (4,200 acres). It contains 10 islands, the largest being Bell (147 hectares (360 acres)) and Bests (132 hectares (330 acres)). The Waimea River, which drains a catchment of about 800 square kilometres (310 sq mi), is the main source of freshwater, with normal flows of about 19 m^{3}/s and recorded floods of up to 2,000 m^{3}/s; about 22 small streams also enter the inlet, the largest being O'Connor, Nieman and Pearl Creeks.

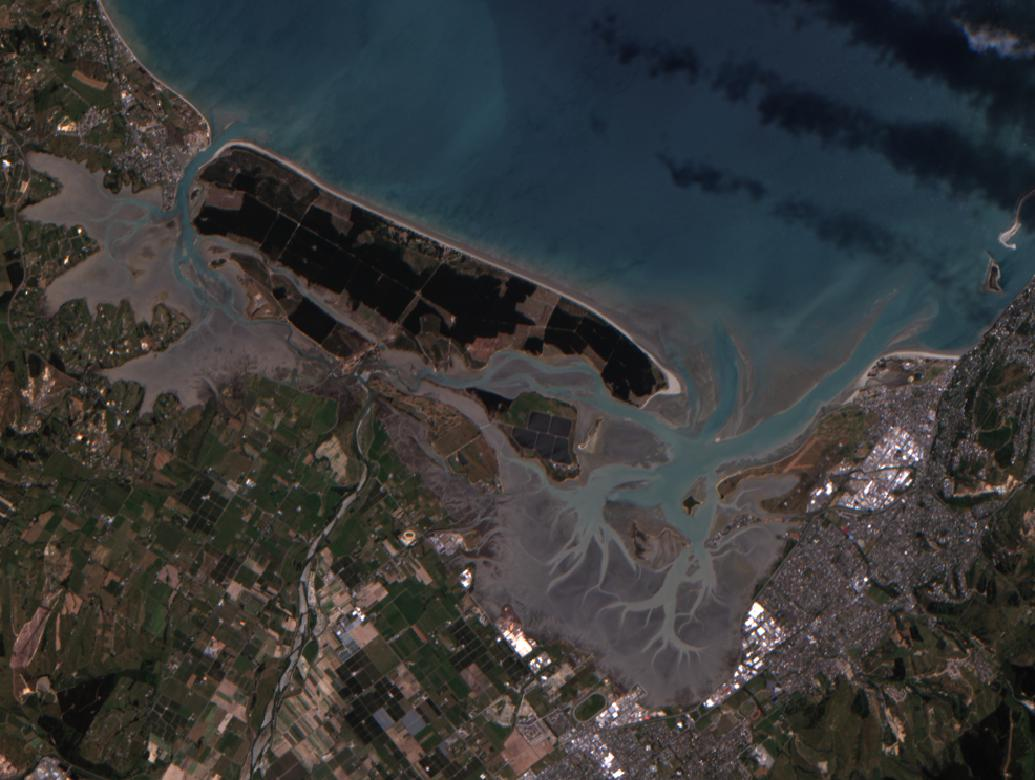
Satellite view, with Rabbit Island enclosing the inlet and Nelson and Richmond to the east

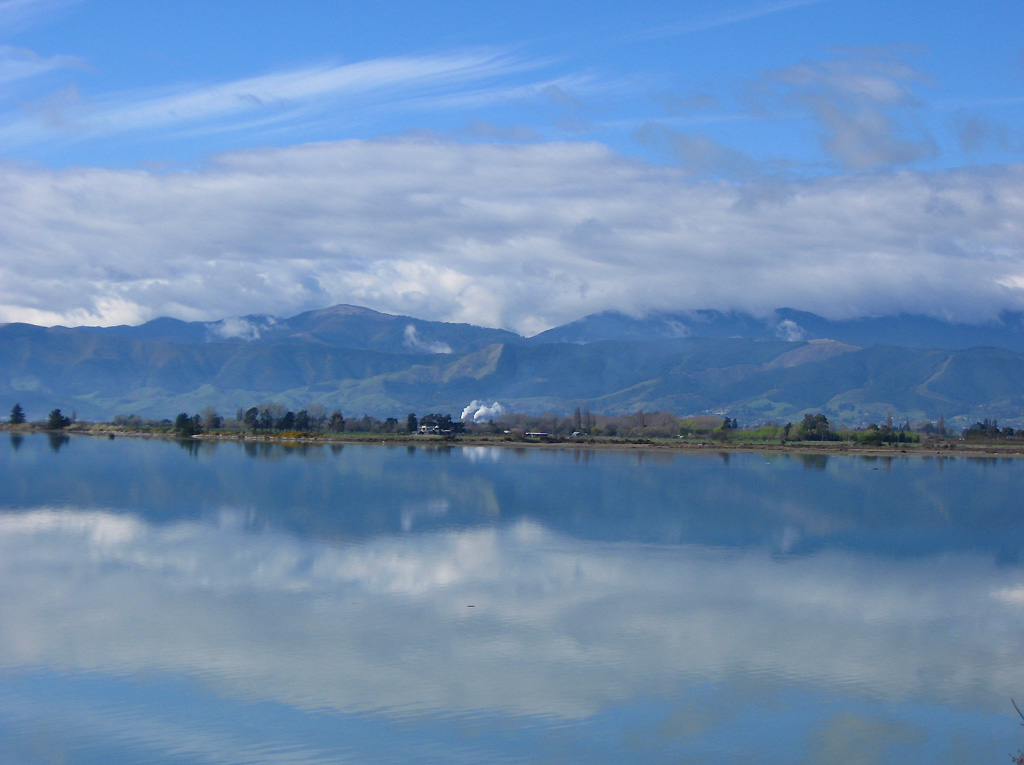
The inlet looking towards Richmond and the Barnicoat Range

== Ecology ==
The Department of Conservation survey recognised 10 habitat types in the inlet. Mudflat was the most extensive (1,126 hectares (2,780 acres)), followed by fine sand flat (784 hectares (1,940 acres)), subtidal (587 hectares (1,450 acres)), mobile sand (342 hectares (850 acres)), pebble and cobble (197 hectares (490 acres)), highshore flat (145 hectares (360 acres)), Sarcocornia saltmarsh (93 hectares (230 acres)), rushes and sedges (75 hectares (190 acres)), eelgrass (58 hectares (140 acres)) and Spartina (29 hectares (72 acres)).

The 1990 survey recorded 112 invertebrate species, 31 marine and 11 freshwater fish species, and 20 estuarine vascular plants; only 227 hectares (560 acres), or 6.6% of the intertidal area, remained in native estuarine vegetation. Compared with two other South Island estuaries against conservation criteria, Waimea Inlet scored the highest of the three, and its whole western arm was assessed as being of outstanding biological importance.

=== Birds ===
The inlet supports a wide variety of estuarine birds and is regarded as nationally important for waders, herons, egrets and spoonbills, and banded rail. A study of monthly low-tide counts across 14 tidal zones between August 1976 and July 1978, drawing on records from 1955 to 1984, recorded 75 species: 52 on the tidal flats and saltmarsh and 23 on the inlet and its immediate shoreline. About 95% of the inlet is exposed at low water on spring tides, giving a wide expanse of intertidal flat for feeding. Numbers were highest from March to June, reflecting a winter increase in South Island pied oystercatcher, southern black-backed gull and red-billed gull; of the Northern Hemisphere migratory waders present in summer, the bar-tailed godwit and knot were the most common. High-tide roosts include the shell bank off Bells Island. The spread of cordgrass (Spartina townsendii), first planted at Mapua around 1932, has reduced feeding habitat by covering tidal flats with dense vegetation that few waders can use.

== Human impact ==
The inlet and its margins have been occupied since the 1500s; a pā and gardens were recorded near Appleby, and the Māori population later declined following invasion by the forces of Te Rauparaha. European settlement began in the 1840s and brought intensive land development. The inlet lies close to the urban centres of Nelson, Stoke and Richmond, with more than 42,000 people living within 8 kilometres (5.0 mi), and it was described as probably the most threatened estuary in the Nelson/Marlborough region. About 200 hectares of the original estuary, mostly marginal saltmarsh, has been lost to reclamation since European settlement. The quality of the inlet's surface waters was assessed as early as the 1970s.
