= Bell Island (Alaska) =

Island in Ketchikan Gateway Borough, Alaska, United States

- Location in Alaska

Geography
- Location: Behm Canal
- Coordinates: 55°57′25″N 131°29′10″W
- Archipelago: Alexander

Administration
- USA
- State: Alaska
- Borough: Ketchikan Gateway

Additional information
- Time zone: Alaska Time Zone

Bell Island is an island in the Alexander Archipelago in Southeast Alaska, United States. It is 14 kilometres (8.7 mi) long, lying in Behm Canal, north of Revillagigedo Island. George Vancouver first visited the island on August 12, 1793, in the evening dining on its south coast. He suspected that it was an island, but this was not proven until later in the same month, when Joseph Whidbey, master of HMS Discovery, charted its entire coastline. Vancouver later named it "Bell's Island" after one of his crew, Midshipman Bell.
