= Neutral Bay ferry wharf =

Ferry wharf in Sydney

Neutral Bay
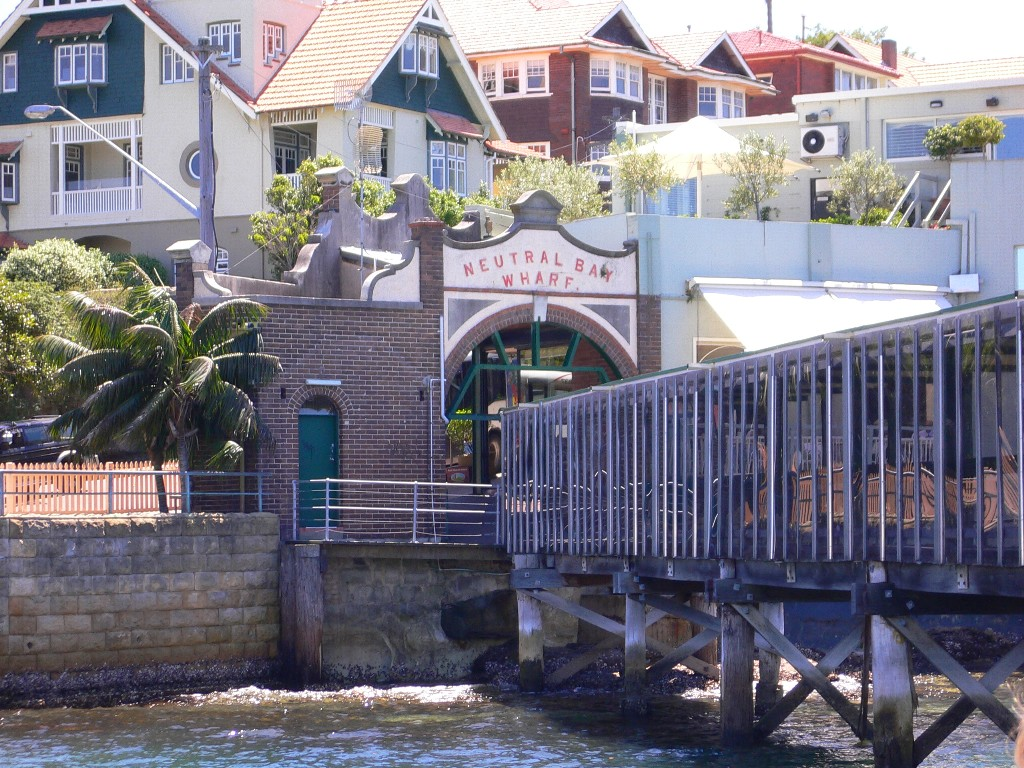
- Previous wharf in March 2007

General information
- Location: Hayes Street, Neutral Bay; New South Wales; Australia
- Coordinates: 33°50′32″S 151°13′10″E
- Owner: Transport for NSW
- Operator: Transdev Sydney Ferries
- Platforms: 1 wharf (1 berth)
- Connections: Bus

Construction
- Accessible: Yes

Other information
- Status: Unstaffed

History
- Rebuilt: 20 August 2012
- Former names: Hayes Street, Neutral Bay (–2002)

Services
Preceding wharf	Sydney Ferries	Following wharf
North Sydney One-way operation	F5 Neutral Bay	Terminus
Kurraba Point towards Circular Quay	F5 Neutral Bay	Terminus
Location

Neutral Bay ferry wharf is located on Neutral Bay on the northern side of Sydney Harbour serving the North Sydney Council suburb of Neutral Bay.

On 20 February 2012, the wharf closed for a rebuild. The existing wharf was demolished, with a new one built reopening on 20 August 2012.

== Wharves and services ==
Neutral Bay wharf is served by Sydney Ferries Neutral Bay services operated by First Fleet class ferries.

Platform	Line	Stopping pattern	Notes
1	F5	to Circular Quay	

== Transport links ==
Keolis Downer Northern Beaches operates one bus route from Neutral Bay wharf:

- 225: to Cremorne Point wharf
