= Bell Island (New Zealand) =

Island in the Nelson harbour, New Zealand

- Interactive map of Bell Island

Geography
- Location: Waimea Inlet, Tasman Bay
- Coordinates: 41°17′30″S 173°10′25″E
- Area: 120 ha (300 acres)
- Length: 2.9 km (1.8 mi)
- Width: 1.1 km (0.68 mi)

Administration
- New Zealand
- Region: Tasman
- Ward: Richmond

Demographics
- Population: uninhabited

Bell Island, or Bell's Island (unofficial) is an island in New Zealand. It functions as a wastewater treatment plant for the nearby city of Nelson and town of Richmond.

Bell Island is a low-lying triangular island, being formed from a raised sandbank in the delta of the Waimea River. It lies to the west of the city of Nelson in the Waimea Inlet, an arm of Tasman Bay / Te Tai-o-Aorere, at the northern end of the South Island. It lies immediately south of the larger Rabbit Island and northeast of Best Island. The island is dominated by the treatment ponds of the sewage plant, which cover much of the east of the island. At the western end, a long narrow spit extends into the mouth of the Waimea River. A smaller, unnamed island and wide sandbank protrude into the inlet at the eastern end of the island.

Bell Island is not to be confused with Pakatoa Island, which previously was known as Bell's Island, nor with Waiheke Island, which was also known as Bell's Island.

== History ==
In 1980 it was announced that there were plans to create a sewage plant on Bell Island. In the 1980s, treatment ponds were constructed on the island, covering approximately 55 hectares. Upgrades were considered in 2008.
