= Belle Island (Wisconsin) =

Island in Wisconsin, United States

Coordinates: 44°23′13″N 89°49′55″W

Belle Island is a river island in Wood County, Wisconsin.

Former variant names were Neeve's Island and Mead Island, after former owners George Neeves and George Mead, respectively. The present name "Belle Island" is commendatory.
