= Transdev Sydney Ferries =

Operator of ferries in Sydney, New South Wales, Australia

- Industry: Ferries
- Predecessor: Sydney Ferries
- Founded: 28 July 2012
- Headquarters: Sydney, Australia
- Area served: Port Jackson; Parramatta River
- Services: Ferry operator
- Parent: Transdev Australasia
- Website: www.transdev.com.au/solutions/sydney-ferries/

Logo of Harbour City Ferries until its rebranding in 2019

Transdev Sydney Ferries, formerly Harbour City Ferries, is a subsidiary of Transdev Australasia, and is the operator of ferry services in the Sydney Ferries network since July 2012. It currently operates the ferry network under a contract until June 2028. As part of the operation contract, Transdev Sydney Ferries leases both the Balmain Maintenance Facility and the fleet from the government agency Sydney Ferries.

== History ==
In 2011, the NSW government decided to contract out ferry services to the private sector. Harbour City Ferries was formed as a 50/50 joint venture between Transfield Services (later Broadspectrum) and Veolia Transdev (later Transdev). In May 2012, Harbour City Ferries was announced as the successful tenderer to operate the services on a seven-year contract starting 28 July 2012.

In December 2016, Harbour City Ferries became fully owned by Transdev Australasia after Transdev bought out Broadspectrum's 50% shareholding. As of December 2016, Harbour City Ferries employs more than 650 people and its fleet consisted of 32 vessels. The government acquired six more ferries in 2017 that were added to the Harbour City Ferries fleet.

In July 2019, Harbour City Ferries commenced a new contract to operate the ferries until June 2028. To coincide with the contract, Harbour City Ferries was rebranded Transdev Sydney Ferries. Its website was updated prematurely in June 2019 to reflect the name change. Ten new River-class ferries were commissioned in 2021. 3 Emerald Class Ferries entered service in 2021 however were briefly withdrawn in 2022 due to multiple steering failures. Seven new Parramatta River-class ferries have been introduced to replace the RiverCats.

== Ferry classes ==
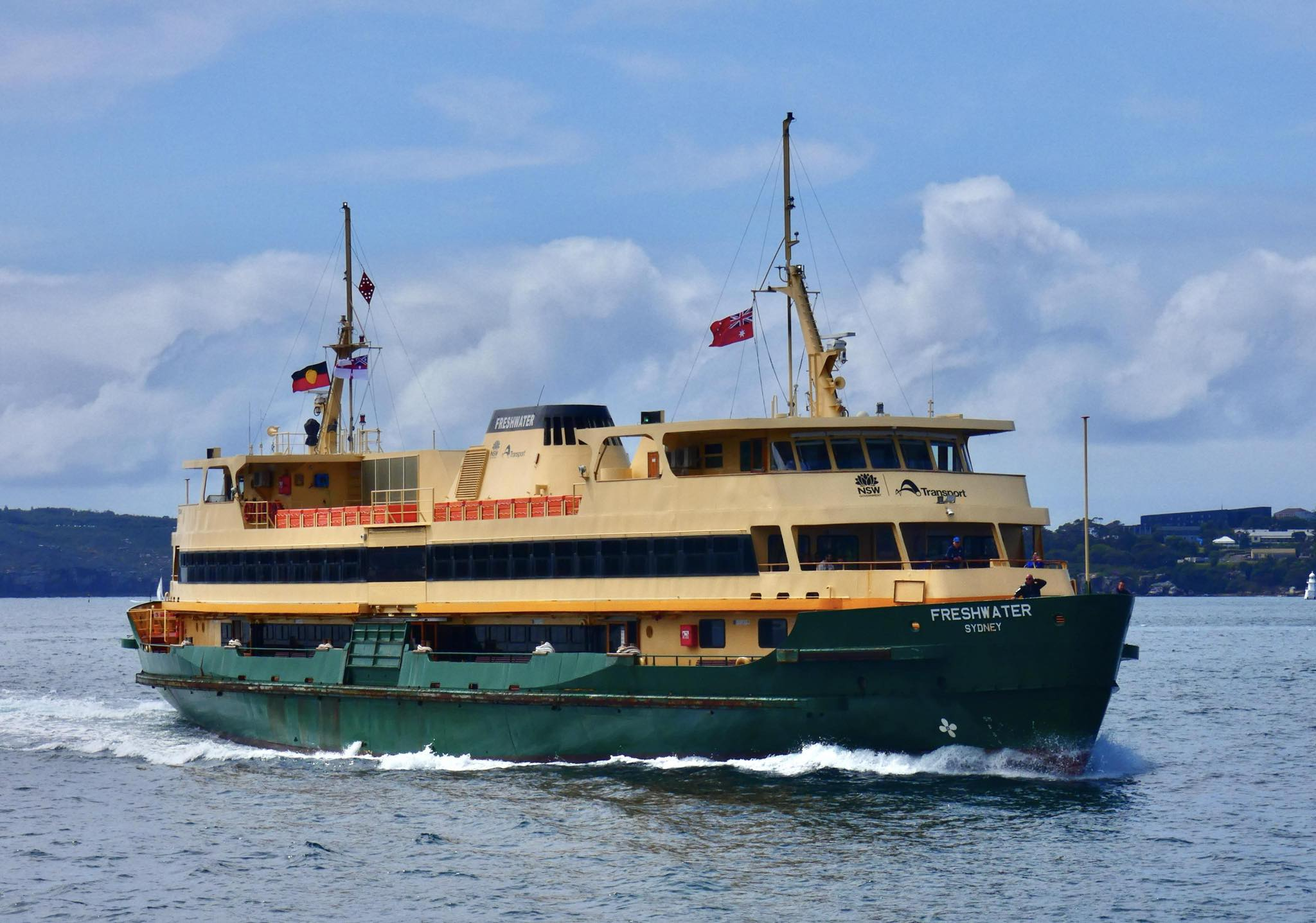
Freshwater-class, since 1982 (Freshwater)

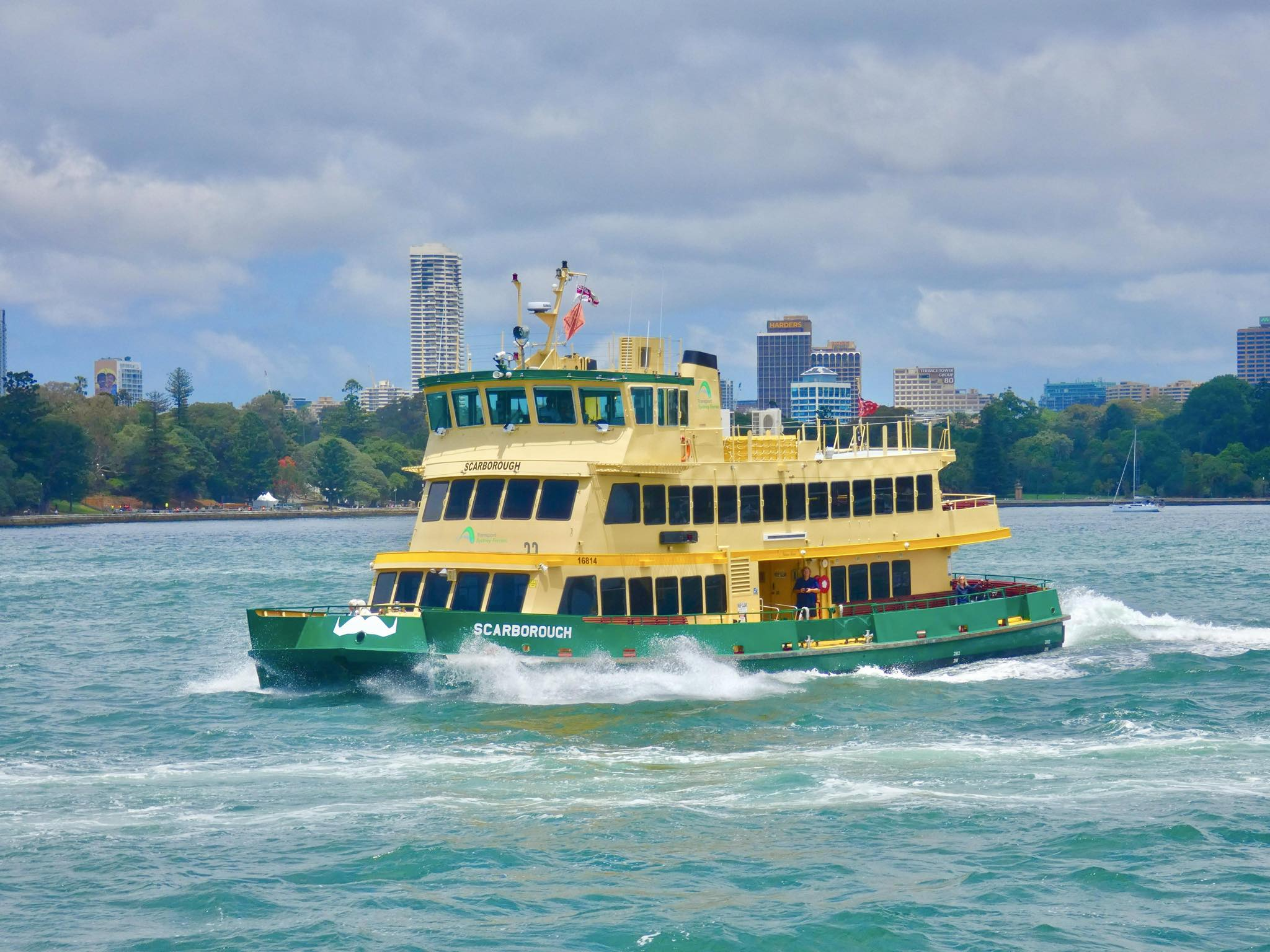
First Fleet-class, since 1984 (Scarborough)

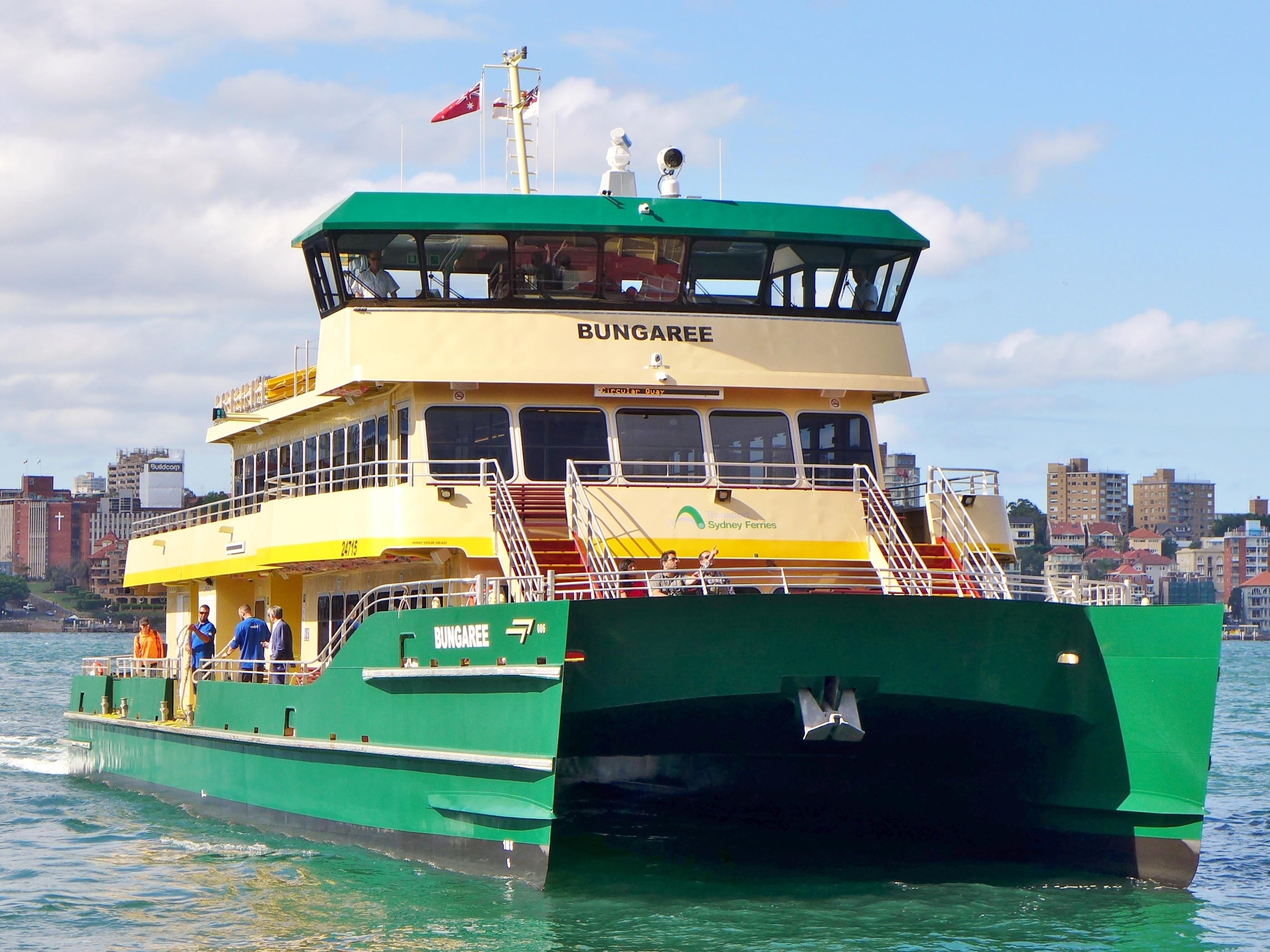
Emerald-class, since 2017.
(Bungaree)

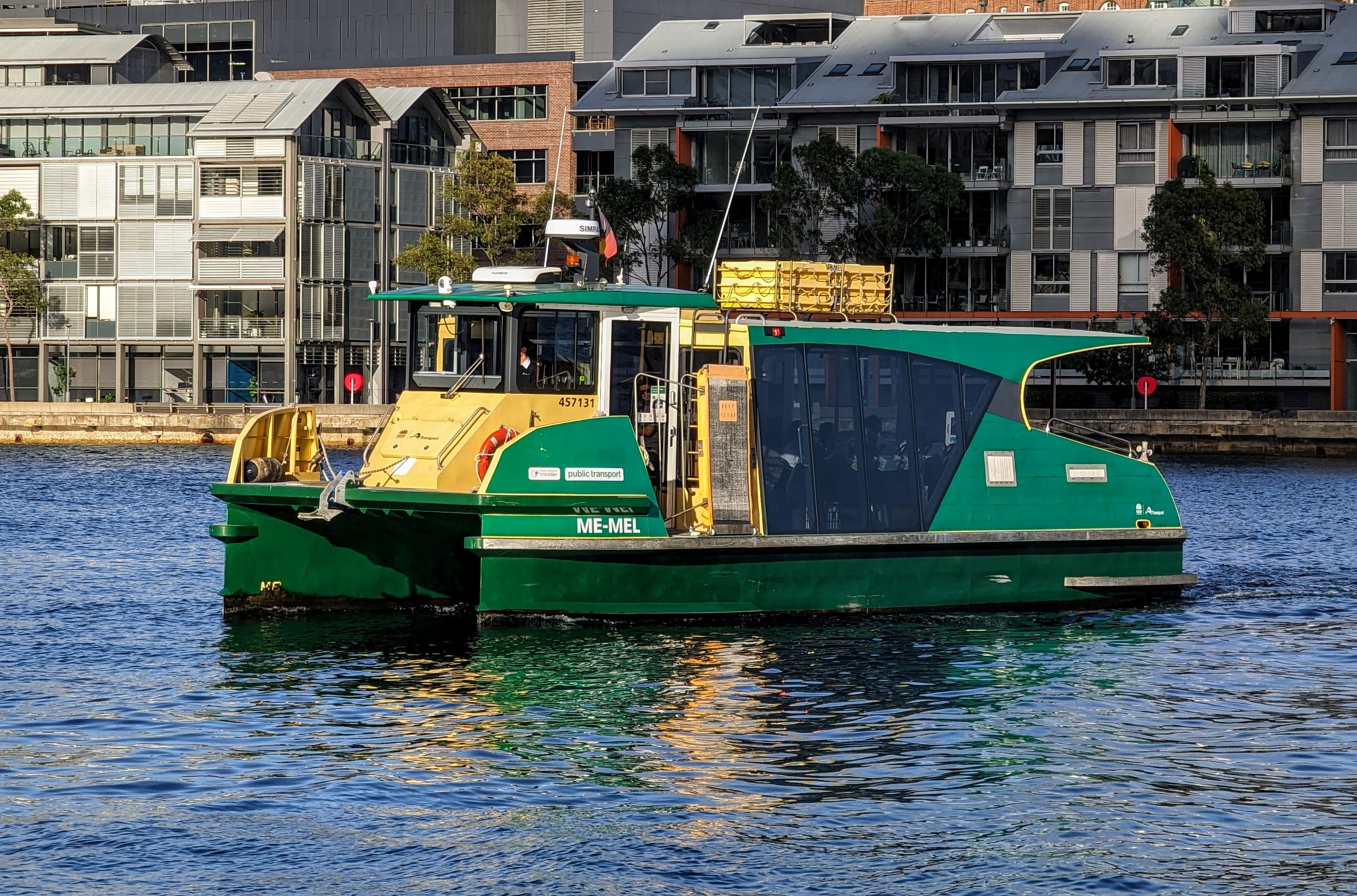
MiniCat-class, since 2019.
(Me‐Mel)

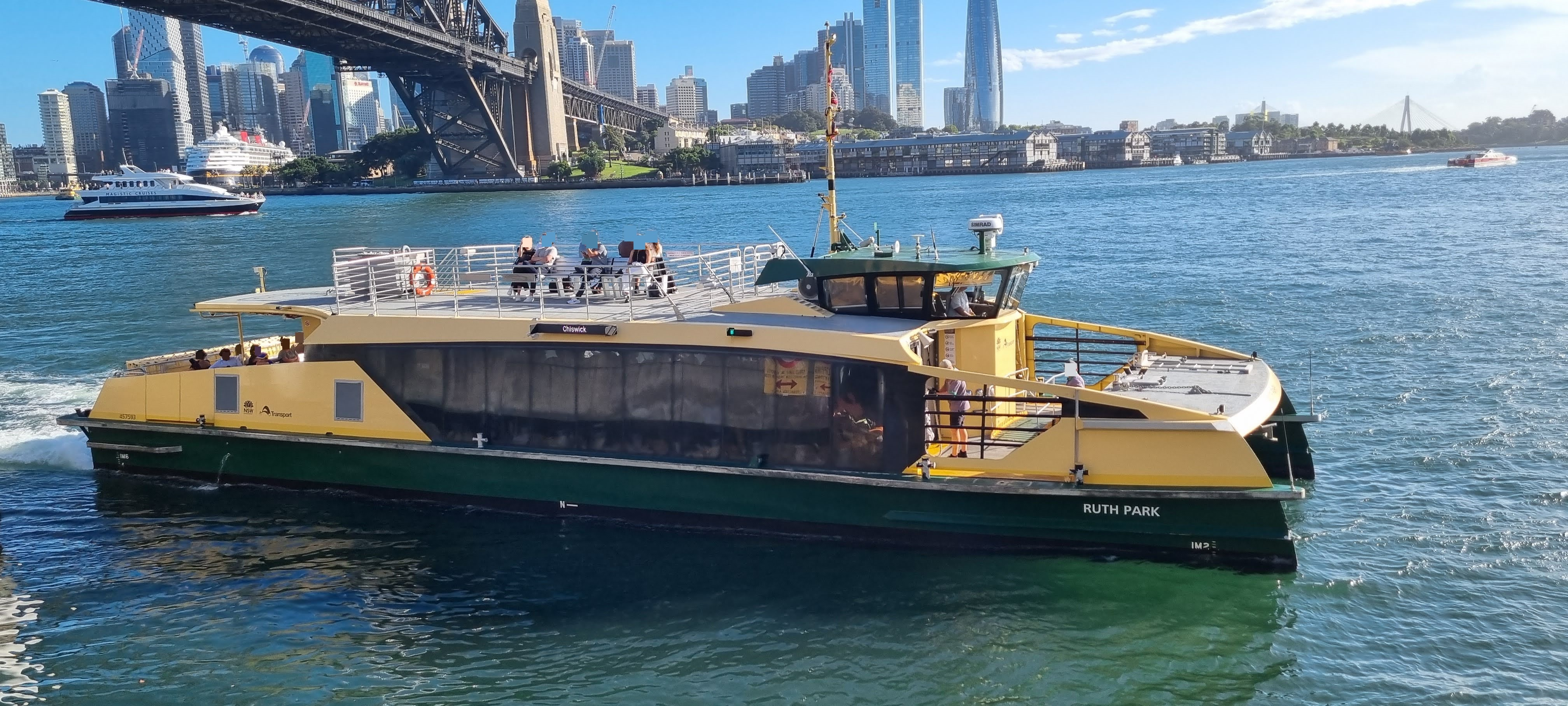
River-class, since 2021.
(Ruth Park)

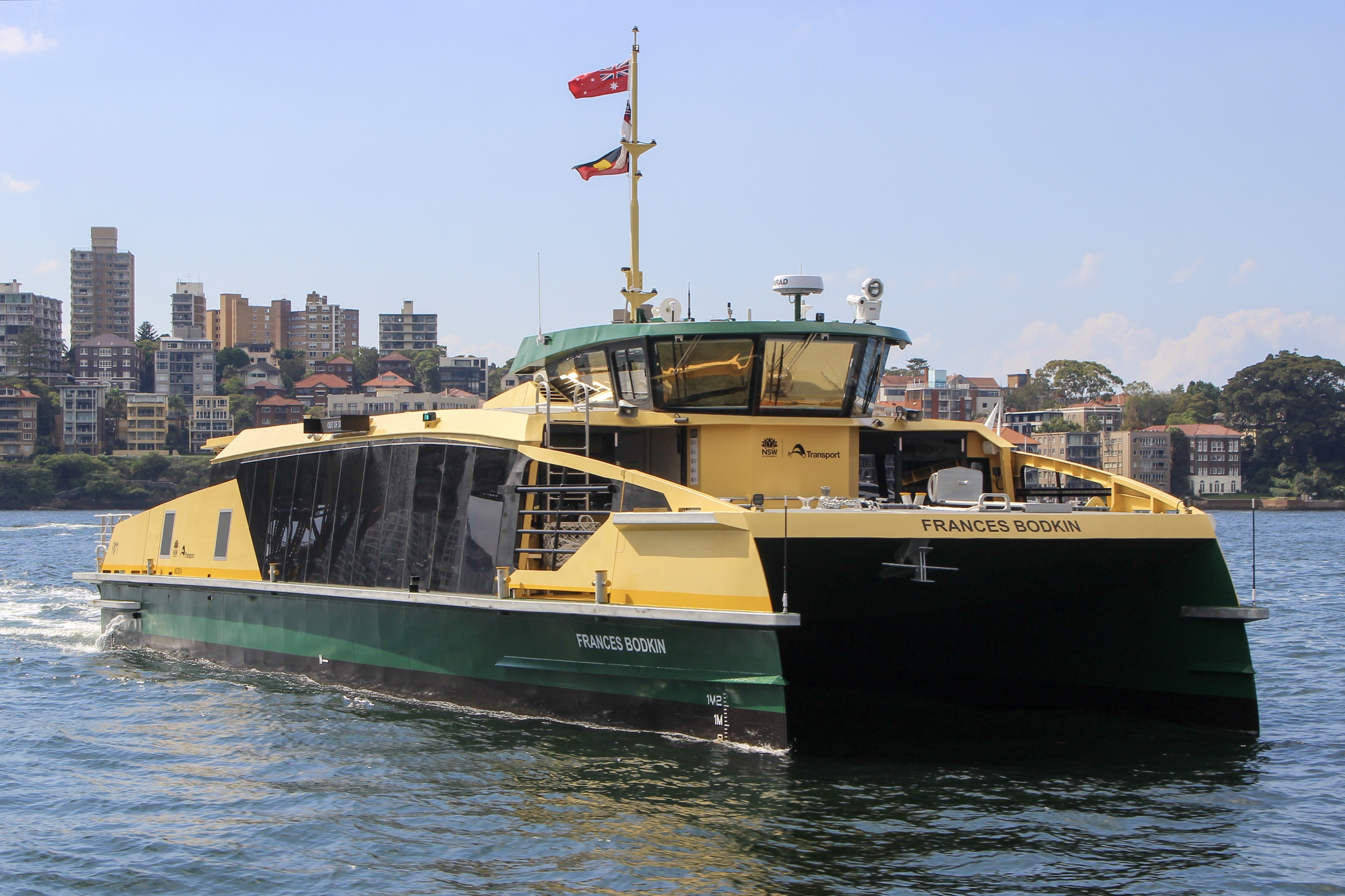
Parramatta River-class, since 2024.
(Frances Bodkin)

== Fleet ==
Sydney Ferries fleet
| Vessel | Class | Service | Capacity | Speed | Length | Displacement | Routes | Origin of name |
|---|---|---|---|---|---|---|---|---|
| Freshwater | Freshwater | 1982 | 1100 | 15 kn | 70.4 m | 1150 t | Manly | Freshwater Beach |
| Queenscliff | Freshwater | 1983 | 1150 | 15 kn | 70.4 m | 1140 t | Manly | Queenscliff Beach |
| Narrabeen | Freshwater | 1984 | 1100 | 15kn | 70.4m | 1150 t | Manly | Narrabeen Beach |
| Alexander | First Fleet | 1985 | 393 | 12 kn | 25.38 m | 105 t | Inner Harbour, Taronga Zoo, Cockatoo Island Double Bay | Alexander, part of the 1787 First Fleet |
| Borrowdale | First Fleet | 1985 | 393 | 12 kn | 25.38 m | 105 t | Inner Harbour, Taronga Zoo, Cockatoo Island Double Bay | Borrowdale, part of the 1787 First Fleet |
| Charlotte | First Fleet | 1985 | 393 | 12 kn | 25.38 m | 105 t | Inner Harbour, Taronga Zoo, Cockatoo Island Double Bay | Charlotte, part of the 1787 First Fleet |
| Fishburn | First Fleet | 1985 | 403 | 12 kn | 25.38 m | 105 t | Inner Harbour, Taronga Zoo, Cockatoo Island Double Bay | Fishburn, part of the 1787 First Fleet |
| Friendship | First Fleet | 1986 | 403 | 12 kn | 25.38 m | 105 t | Inner Harbour, Taronga Zoo, Cockatoo Island Double Bay | Friendship, part of the 1787 First Fleet |
| Golden Grove | First Fleet | 1986 | 403 | 12 kn | 25.38 m | 105 t | Inner Harbour, Taronga Zoo, Cockatoo Island Double Bay | Golden Grove, part of the 1787 First Fleet |
| Scarborough | First Fleet | 1986 | 403 | 12 kn | 25.38 m | 105 t | Inner Harbour, Taronga Zoo, Cockatoo Island Double Bay | Scarborough, part of the 1787 First Fleet |
| Sirius | First Fleet | 1984 | 393 | 12 kn | 25.38 m | 105 t | Inner Harbour, Taronga Zoo, Cockatoo Island Double Bay | HMS Sirius, flagship of the 1787 First Fleet |
| Supply | First Fleet | 1984 | 393 | 12 kn | 25.38 m | 105 t | Inner Harbour, Taronga Zoo, Cockatoo Island Double Bay | HMS Supply, part of the 1787 First Fleet |
| Catherine Hamlin | Emerald | 2017 | 400 | 26 kn | 36.38 m | 40 t | Eastern Suburbs, Inner Harbour | Catherine Hamlin, obstetrician and gynaecologist |
| Fred Hollows | Emerald | 2017 | 400 | 26 kn | 36.38 m | 40 t | Eastern Suburbs, Inner Harbour | Fred Hollows, ophthalmologist |
| Victor Chang | Emerald | 2017 | 400 | 26 kn | 36.38 m | 40 t | Eastern Suburbs, Inner Harbour | Victor Chang, cardiac surgeon |
| Pemulwuy | Emerald | 2017 | 400 | 26 kn | 36.38 m | 40 t | Eastern Suburbs, Inner Harbour | Pemulwuy, Aboriginal political leader and elder |
| Bungaree | Emerald | 2017 | 400 | 26 kn | 36.38 m | 40 t | Eastern Suburbs, Inner Harbour | Bungaree, Aboriginal explorer and leader |
| May Gibbs | Emerald | 2017 | 400 | 26 kn | 36.38 m | 40 t | Eastern Suburbs, Inner Harbour | May Gibbs |
| Me‐Mel | MiniCat | 2019 | 60 | 22 kn | 12.5 m | | Blackwattle Bay | Goat Island | Gadigal word meaning “the eye” |
| Fairlight | Emerald | 2021 | 400 | 26 kn | 36.38 m | 40 t | Manly | Sydney beach |
| Balmoral | Emerald | 2021 | 400 | 26 kn | 36.38 m | 40 t | Manly | Sydney beach |
| Clontarf | Emerald | 2021 | 400 | 26 kn | 36.38 m | 40 t | Manly | Sydney beach |
| Ruby Langford Ginibi | River | 2021 | 200 | | 25 m | | Inner Harbour, Parramatta River | Ruby Langford Ginibi |
| Esme Timbery | River | 2021 | 200 | | 25 m | | Inner Harbour, Parramatta River | Esme Timbery |
| Margaret Olley | River | 2021 | 200 | | 25 m | | Inner Harbour, Parramatta River | Margaret Olley |
| Olive Cotton | River | 2021 | 200 | | 25 m | | Inner Harbour, Parramatta River | Olive Cotton |
| Ruth Park | River | 2021 | 200 | | 25 m | | Inner Harbour, Parramatta River | Ruth Park |
| Ethel Turner | River | 2021 | 200 | | 25 m | | Inner Harbour, Parramatta River | Ethel Turner |
| Cheryl Salisbury | River | 2021 | 200 | | 25 m | | Inner Harbour, Parramatta River | Cheryl Salisbury |
| Liz Ellis | River | 2021 | 200 | | 25 m | | Inner Harbour, Parramatta River | Liz Ellis |
| Lauren Jackson | River | 2021 | 200 | | 25 m | | Inner Harbour, Parramatta River | Lauren Jackson |
| Kurt Fearnley | River | 2021 | 200 | | 25 m | | Inner Harbour, Parramatta River | Kurt Fearnley |
| Frances Bodkin | Parramatta River | 2024 | 200 | | 24 m | | Parramatta River | Frances Bodkin |
| John Nutt | Parramatta River | 2024 | 200 | | 24 m | | Parramatta River | John Nutt |
| Isobel Bennett | Parramatta River | 2024 | 200 | | 24m | | Parramatta River | Isobel Bennett |
| Martin Green | Parramatta River | 2025 | 200 | | 24m | | Parramatta River | Martin Green (professor) |
| Ruby Payne Scott | Parramatta River | 2025 | 200 | | 24m | | Parramatta River | Ruby Payne-Scott |
| Norman Selfe | Parramatta River | 2025 | 200 | | 24m | | Parramatta River | Norman Selfe |
| Jack Mundey | Parramatta River | 2925 | 200 | | 24m | | Parramatta River | Jack Mundey |

=== Former fleet ===
| Vessel | Class | Entered service | Retired from service | Capacity | Length | Displacement | Routes | Origin of name | Current status of vessel |
|---|---|---|---|---|---|---|---|---|---|
| Lady Herron | Lady | 1979 | October 2017 | 550 | 38.71 m | 287t | Inner Harbour, Taronga Zoo Double Bay | Leslie Herron Chief justice | Scrapped |
| Lady Northcott | Lady | 1974 | October 2017 | 800 | 42.5 m | 383t | Inner Harbour Taronga Zoo Double Bay | John Northcott Army General | Donated to the Aboriginal cruise company Tribal Warrior in 2021 and was converted to a cruise vessel. |
| Saint Mary Mackillop | SuperCat | 2000 | December 2021 | 250 | 37.76 m | 49 t | Eastern Suburbs | Mary MacKillop Australia's first saint, canonised in 2010 | Sold and renamed Hygeia IV |
| Anne Sargeant | Harbourcat | 1998 | 28 July 2022 | 150 | 29.6 m | 35 t | Parramatta River | Anne sargeant netballer | Sold, currently stored in Brisbane. |
| Susie O'Neill | Supercat | 2000 | 31 August 2022 | 250 | 37.76 m | 49 t | Eastern Suburbs | Susie O'Neill swimmer | Sold to ZigZag Whitsundays in 2024 and renamed "Super Flyer" |
| Betty Cuthbert | RiverCat | 1992 | 17 February 2023 | 230 | 36.8 m | 41 t | Parramatta River | Betty Cuthbert athlete | Scrapped |
| Pam Burridge | Harbourcat | 1998 | 26 July 2023 | 150 | 29.6 m | 35 t | Parramatta River | Pam Burridge surfer | Sold and renamed "Sea Wasp |
| Collaroy | Freshwater | 1988 | 27 September 2023 | 1150 | 70.4 m | 1140 t | Manly | Collaroy Beach | stored at Cockatoo Island |
| Louise Sauvage | Supercat | 2001 | 22 March 2024 | 250 | 37.76 m | 49 t | Eastern Suburbs | Louise Sauvage paralympian | Renamed “Louis” and sold to Coral Sea Cruises, Whitsundays. |
| Supercat 4 | Supercat | 2001 | 28 April 2024 | 250 | 37.76 m | 49 t | Eastern Suburbs | Fourth Supercat ferry | Renamed to "Percat" and sold to Suncity Ferry Services Fiji. |
| Evonne Goolagong | Rivercat | 1993 | 7 June 2024 | 230 | 36.8 m | 41 t | Parramatta River | Evonne Goolagong tennis player | Scrapped |
| Nicole Livingstone | Rivercat | 1995 | 28 October 2024 | 230 | 36.8 m | 41 t | Parramatta River | Nicole Livingstone Swimmer | Scrapped |
| Marlene Mathews | Rivercat | 1993 | 4 February 2025 | 230 | 36.8 m | 41 t | Parramatta River | Marlene Mathews athlete | Scrapped |
| Marjorie Jackson | Rivercat | 1993 | 3 June 2025 | 230 | 36.8 m | 41 t | Parramatta River | Marjorie Jackson Athlete | Scrapped |
| Shane Gould | Rivercat | 1993 | 30 September 2025 | 230 | 36.8 m | 41 t | Parramatta River | Shane Gould swimmer | Scrapped |
| Dawn Fraser | Rivercat | 1992 | 9 March 2026 | 230 | 36.8 m | 41 t | Parramatta River | Dawn Fraser Swimmer | Scrapped |
