= Garden Island ferry wharf =

Ferry in Australia

Garden Island
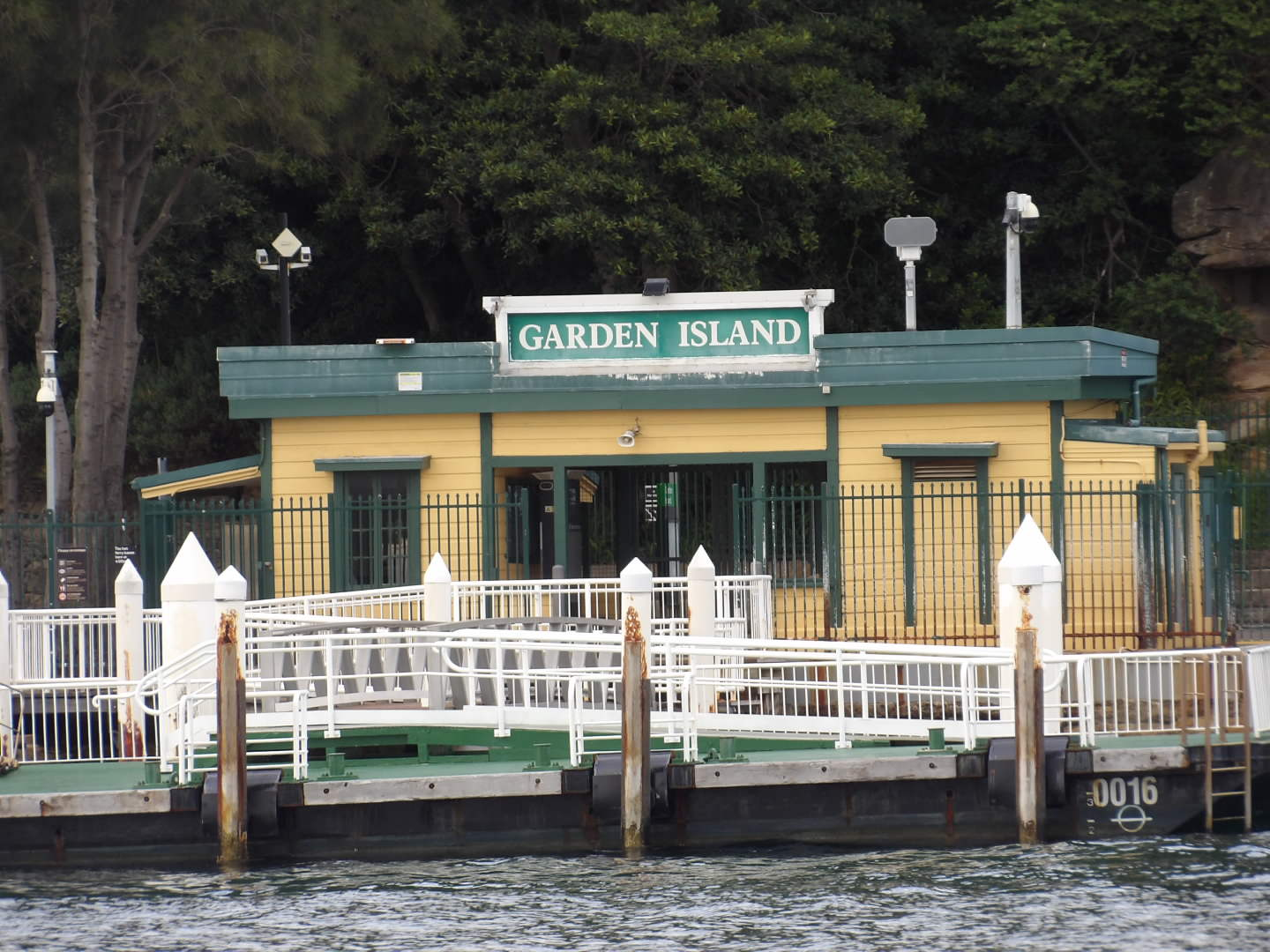
- Garden Island ferry wharf in April 2025

General information
- Location: Garden Island, Potts Point; New South Wales; Australia
- Coordinates: 33°51′29″S 151°13′48″E
- Owner: Transport for NSW
- Platforms: 1
Location

Garden Island ferry wharf is a closed ferry wharf located on the southern side of Sydney Harbour. It serves the Royal Australian Navy's Heritage Centre on Garden Island. The wharf is no longer serviced by public or private ferries and is not open to the public. Fences prevent access from the wharf to the Garden Island Defence Precinct.

== Wharves and services ==
Garden Island wharf was served by Sydney Ferries Double Bay services operated by First Fleet and SuperCat class ferries. Prior to its closure as a public wharf, it only opened between 10:00 and 16:00, coinciding with the opening hours of the Royal Australian Navy's Heritage Centre, Garden Island.

Around 2014 the security arrangements at Garden Island Defence Precinct changed whereby the previously fenced northern section of the facility was now open to all Defence users but would no longer allow the public to access the wharf of Navy Heritage Centre, which now requires special access passes and escorts to visit.

The Captain Cook Cruises Hop On/Hop Off Sydney Harbour ferry service previously operated via Garden Island wharf.
