= Watsons Bay ferry service =

Ferry route in Sydney

F9 Watsons Bay

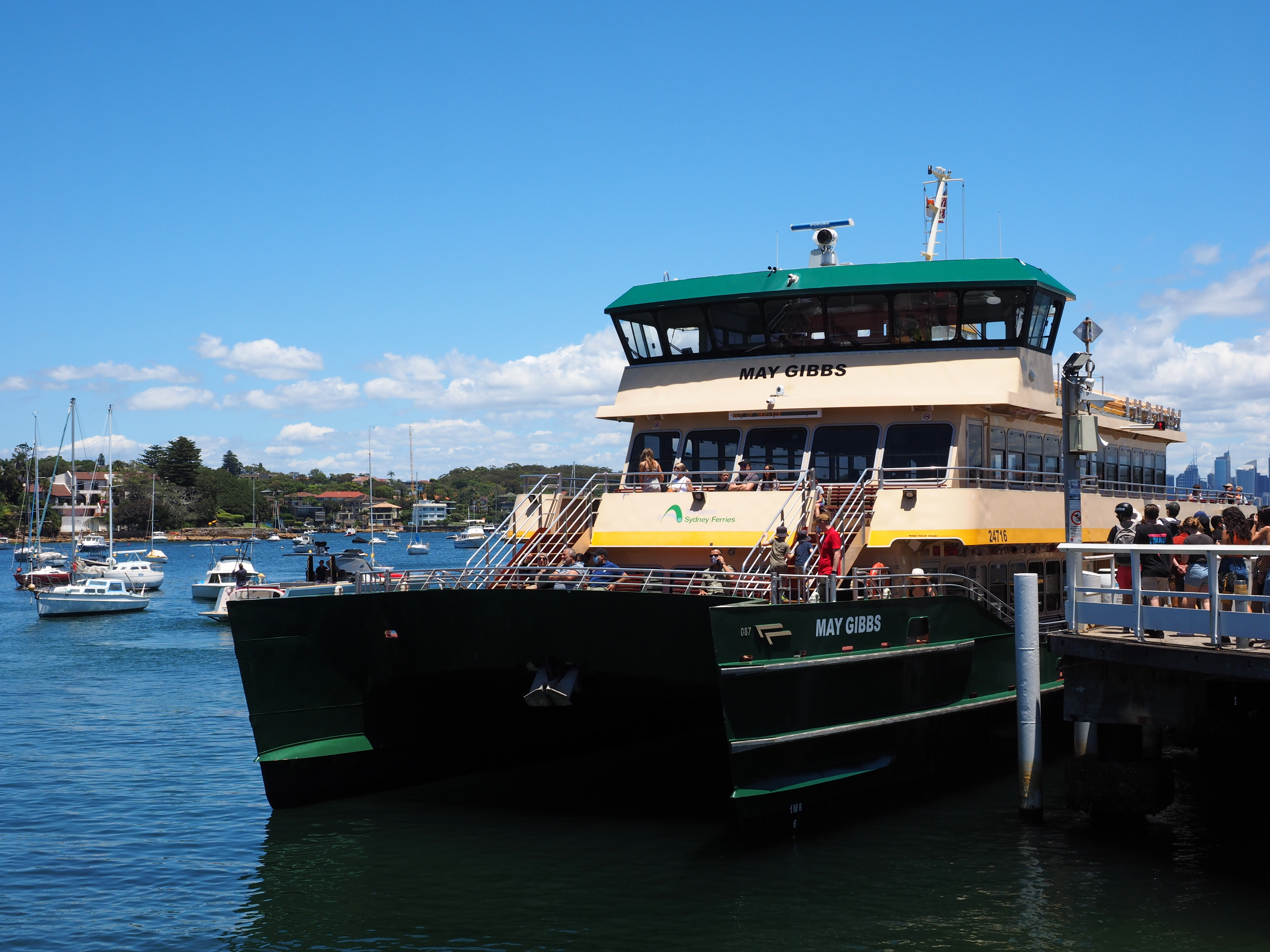
- MV May Gibbs at Watsons Bay in December 2021
- Locale: Sydney
- Waterway: Sydney Harbour
- Fleet: Emerald class
- Owner: Sydney Ferries
- Operator: Transdev Sydney Ferries
- Authority: Transport for NSW

The Watsons Bay ferry service, officially known as F9 Watsons Bay, is a ferry service in Sydney, Australia. Part of the Sydney Ferries network, it is operated by Transdev Sydney Ferries from Circular Quay to Rose Bay and Watsons Bay.

== History ==
Sydney Ferries Limited operated services from Circular Quay to Watsons Bay until withdrawn in 1933. The Sydney Harbour Transport Board reinstated weekend and holiday services to Watsons Bay in 1966 with the Karingal and Karrabee. These ceased due to lack of patronage. Weekend only services were reintroduced by the Urban Transit Authority on 1 February 1987. In 1992, some peak hour State Transit Authority services began to call at Double Bay. By 2002 it was operating daily with SuperCats calling at Garden Island, Darling Point, Double Bay and Rose Bay.

In October 2013, the service received the F7 classification as part of a numbering of all Sydney ferry services. In November 2017 the service was restructured. Services to Garden Island, Darling Point and Double Bay became the F7 Double Bay service, while the Watsons Bay service was merged with the F4 Pyrmont Bay service to become the F4 Cross Harbour service operating from Pyrmont Bay via Circular Quay through to Rose Bay and Watsons Bay. It was split again on 25 October 2020, becoming the F9 service.

During peak hour, the service only operates between Circular Quay and Rose Bay, with Captain Cook Cruises operating a service to Watsons Bay during these times.

During high winds Ferries do not run to Watsons Bay and terminate at Rose Bay.

== Patronage ==
The following table shows the patronage of Sydney Ferries network for the year 2025.

2025-26 Sydney Ferries annual patronage by line (Note: Figures based on Opal tap on and tap off data)
Manly ferry service	4,532,938	View source data.
Taronga Zoo ferry service	1,545,805	View source data.
Parramatta River ferry service	2,429,310	View source data.
Pyrmont Bay ferry service	2,779,319	View source data.
Neutral Bay ferry service	562,998	View source data.
Mosman Bay ferry service	709,762	View source data.
Double Bay ferry service	273,741	View source data.
Cockatoo Island ferry service	535,934	View source data.
Watsons Bay ferry service	1,873,854	View source data.
Blackwattle Bay ferry service	17,970	
