= Eastern Suburbs ferry services =

Eastern Suburbs ferry services may refer to:

- Double Bay ferry service
- Watsons Bay ferry service
