= Rose Bay ferry wharf =

Sydney Ferries ferry wharf

Rose Bay
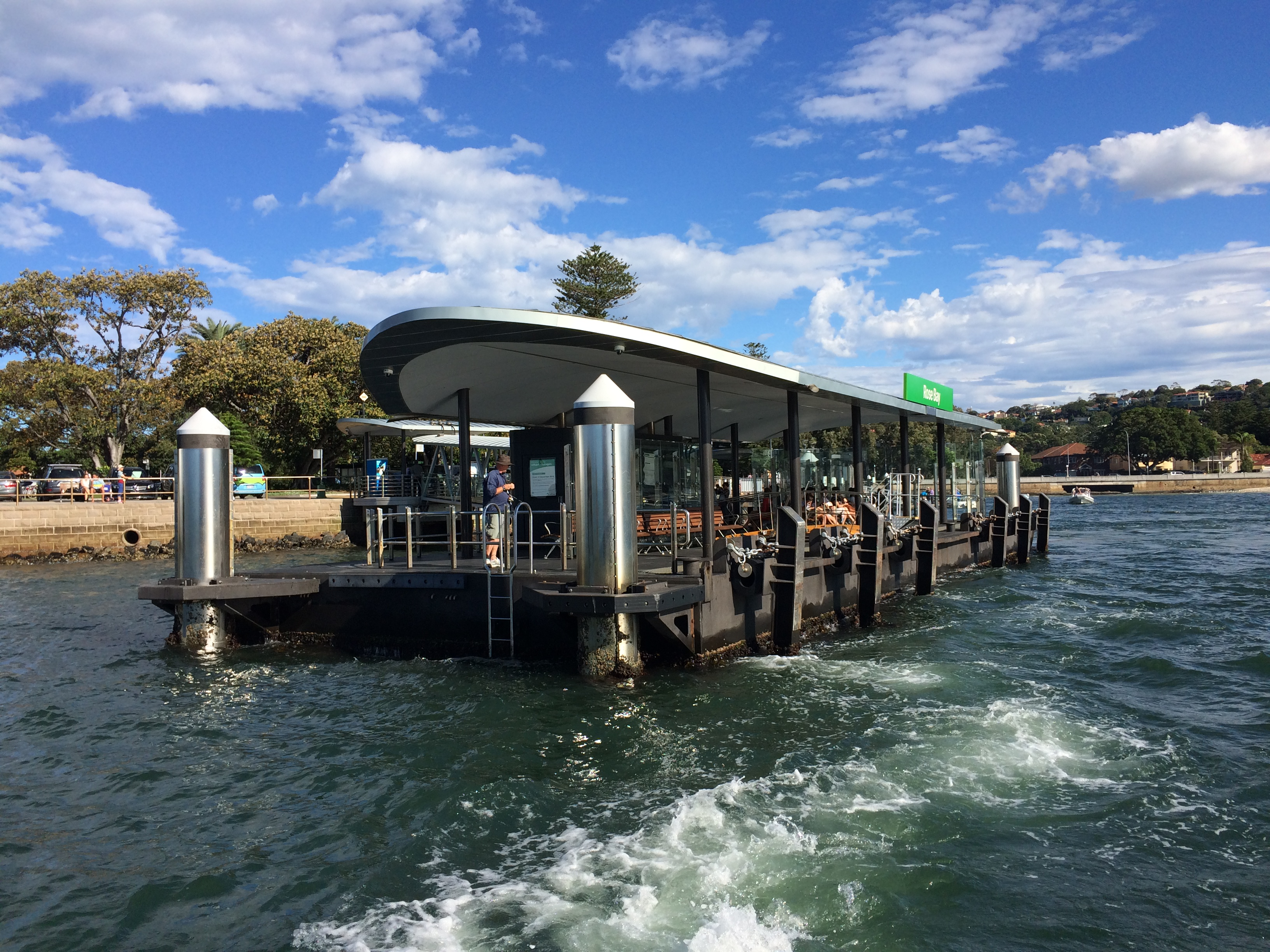
- Rose Bay ferry wharf in April 2017

General information
- Location: New South Head Road, Rose Bay; Australia
- Coordinates: 33°52′16″S 151°15′44″E
- Owner: Transport for NSW
- Operator: Transdev Sydney Ferries
- Platforms: 1
- Connections: Buses

Construction
- Accessible: Yes

History
- Rebuilt: 26 September 2012

Services
Preceding wharf	Sydney Ferries	Following wharf
Circular Quay Terminus	F9 Watsons Bay	Watsons Bay Terminus
Location

Rose Bay ferry wharf is located on the southern side of Sydney Harbour serving the Sydney suburb of Rose Bay.

== History ==
On 23 March 1970, Stannard Brothers commenced operating a service to Circular Quay. On the same date its Mosman to Double Bay service was rerouted to Rose Bay. The former is now operated by Sydney Ferries, while the latter which primarily operated to service private schools in the area and was being operated by Rosman Ferries ceased in December 2003 after the State Government withdrew funding.

In September 2012, a new wharf opened to the east with the older wharf retained for other craft to use.

This wharf is served by Emerald-class ferries.

== Services ==
Rose Bay wharf is served by Sydney Ferries Watsons Bay services.

Manly Fast Ferry operates Sydney Harbour tourist services via Rose Bay.

Platform	Line	Stopping pattern	Notes
1	Watsons Bay ferry service	Services to Watsons Bay & Circular Quay	
1	My Fast Ferry Cruises	Hop on/Hop off service around Sydney Harbour	

== Transport links ==
Transdev John Holland operates three bus routes via New South Head Road, under contract to Transport for NSW:

- 323: Circular Quay to Dover Heights
- 324: Circular Quay to Watsons Bay via Vaucluse
- 325: Circular Quay to Watsons Bay via Nielsen Park
