= Taronga Zoo ferry wharf =

Ferry location in Mosman, New South Wales, Australia

Taronga Zoo
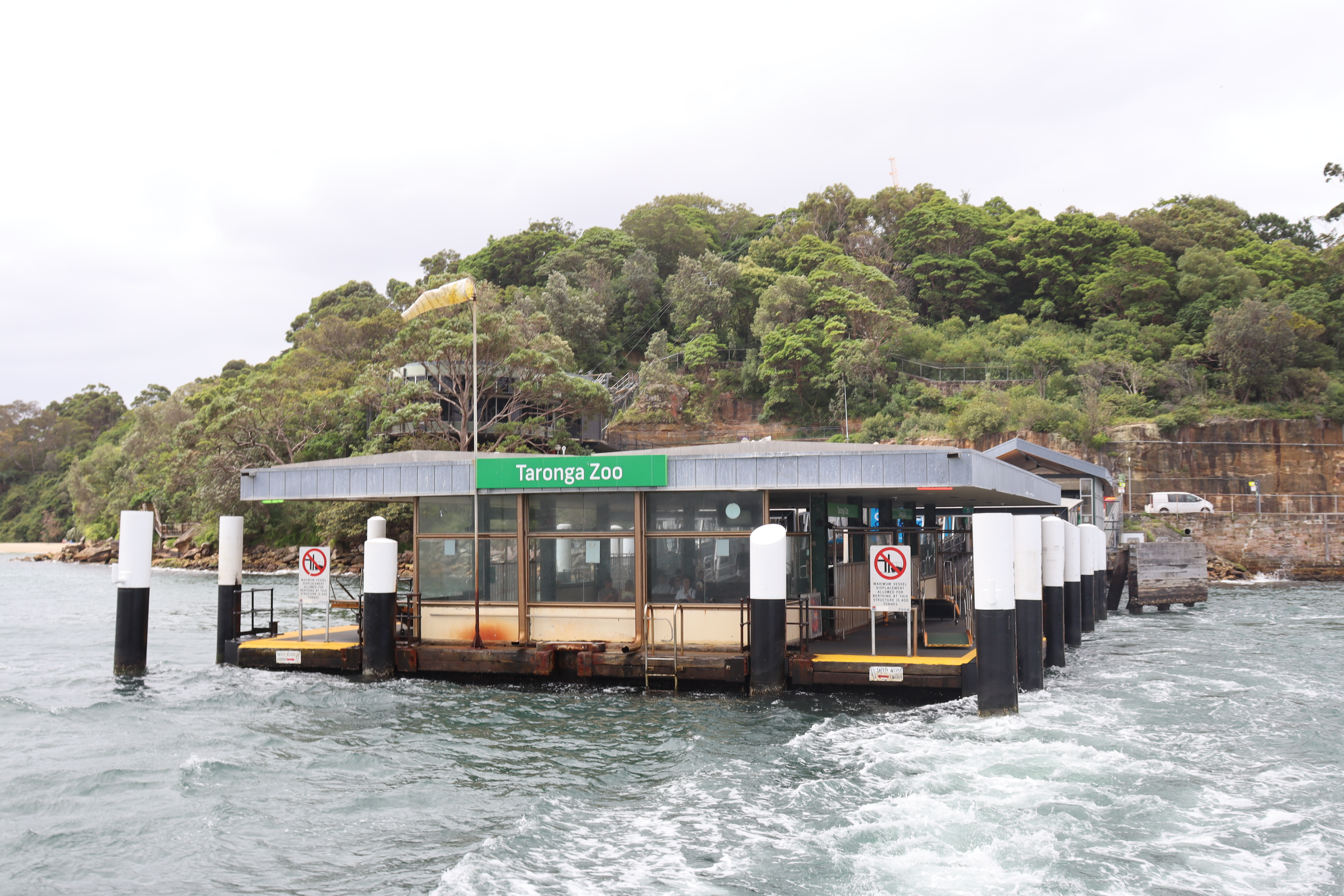
- Wharf in December 2025

General information
- Location: Athol Wharf Road, Mosman; New South Wales; Australia
- Coordinates: 33°50′47″S 151°14′22″E
- Owner: Transport for NSW
- Operator: Transdev Sydney Ferries
- Platforms: 1 wharf (2 berths)
- Connections: Taronga Zoo Wharf, Athol Wharf Rd

Construction
- Accessible: Yes

Other information
- Status: Staffed

History
- Former names: Taronga Zoo Athol Wharf (–1995)

Services
Preceding wharf	Sydney Ferries	Following wharf
Circular Quay Terminus	F2 Taronga Zoo	Terminus
Location

Taronga Zoo ferry wharf is located on the northern side of Sydney Harbour serving Taronga Zoo. It is a short walk from Taronga Zoo's Lower Entrance.

== Services ==
Taronga Zoo wharf is served by Sydney Ferries Taronga Zoo services operated by First Fleet and Emerald class ferries. It is also served by Captain Cook Cruises services to Darling Harbour.

Platform	Line	Stopping pattern	Notes
1	F2	to Circular Quay	
1	Captain Cook Cruises Harbour Explorer	Hop on/Hop off around Sydney Harbour	
1	Fantasea Cruising cruises	Tourist Hop on/Hop off service around Sydney Harbour	

== Transport links ==
Keolis Downer Northern Beaches operates one bus route via Taronga Zoo wharf, under contract to Transport for NSW:

- 238: to Balmoral Beach via Taronga Zoo Main Entrance
