= Circular Quay ferry wharf =

Complex of wharves in Australia

Circular Quay
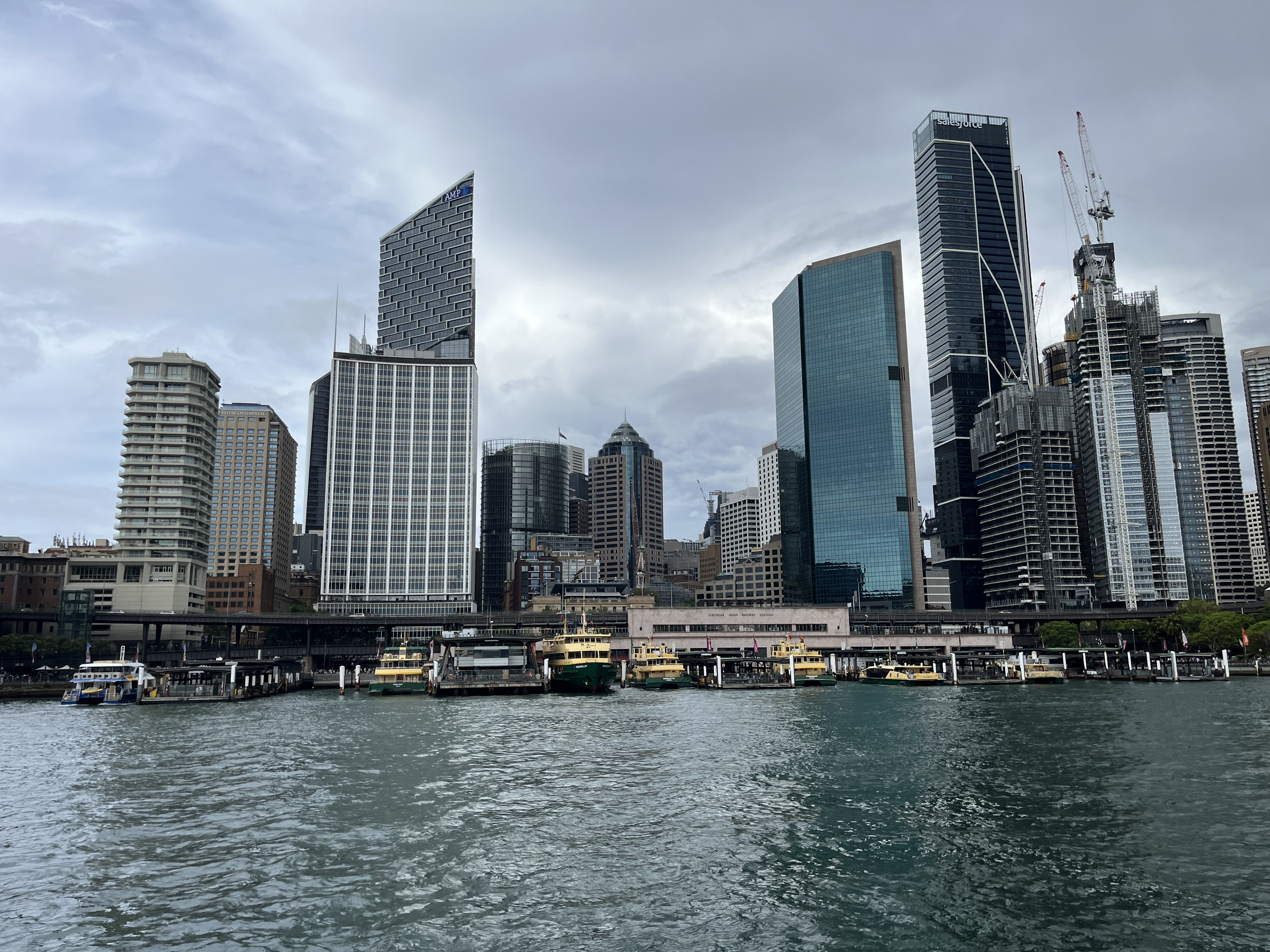
- View towards the wharf, railway station and surrounding buildings from Sydney Cove, 2025

General information
- Location: Alfred Street, Sydney; New South Wales; Australia
- Coordinates: 33°51′40″S 151°12′39″E
- Owner: Transport for NSW
- Operator: Transdev Sydney Ferries
- Platforms: 5 wharves (10 berths)
- Connections: Circular Quay; Circular Quay; Circular Quay

Construction
- Accessible: Yes

Other information
- Status: Staffed

History
- Former names: Circular Quay Ferry Terminal (–2013)
Services
| Preceding wharf | Sydney Ferries | Following wharf |
|---|---|---|
| Terminus | F1 Manly | Manly Terminus |
| Terminus | F2 Taronga Zoo | Taronga Zoo Terminus |
| Terminus | F3 Parramatta | Milsons Point towards Parramatta |
| Terminus | F4 Pyrmont Bay | Milsons Point towards Pyrmont Bay |
| Terminus | F5 Neutral Bay | Kirribilli towards Neutral Bay |
| Terminus | F6 Mosman Bay | Cremorne Point towards Mosman Bay |
| Terminus | F7 Double Bay | Darling Point towards Double Bay |
| Terminus | F8 Cockatoo Island | Balmain towards Cockatoo Island |
| Terminus | F9 Watsons Bay | Rose Bay towards Watsons Bay |
Location

Time-lapse of maritime traffic at Circular Quay, 2018

The Circular Quay ferry wharf is a complex of wharves at Circular Quay, on Sydney Cove, that serves as the hub for the Sydney Harbour ferry network. It is adjacent to Circular Quay railway station and the terminus station for the CBD and South East Light Rail line, thus serving as an interchange for those services. The complex consists of five wharfs, servicing the Sydney ferry fleet as well as various privately owned ferry services.

== Layout ==
The Circular Quay ferry wharf complex consists of five double-sided wharves at 90 degrees to the shoreline, numbered 2 to 6. Wharves 3 to 5 are used exclusively by Sydney Ferries, wharf 2 Side B is used by Sydney Ferries, wharf 2 A is used by Manly Fast Ferry by while wharf 6 is used by other operators including Captain Cook Cruises. Each wharf has ticket selling facilities on both sides of the barriers as most other wharves do not have such facilities.

On the eastern side alongside Bennelong Apartments, is the Eastern Pontoon used by charter operators. On the western side, lie the Commissioners Steps and Harbour Masters Steps that charter operators and water taxis use.

When the Port Jackson & Manly Steamship Company introduced hydrofoils to the Manly service in the mid-1960s, a pontoon was attached to the eastern side of wharf 2 to allow the hydrofoils to berth without their foils fouling the wharf. This was removed when the hydrofoils were replaced by JetCats in 1991 before being replaced by the Manly Fast Ferry service in 2009.

Wharf 3 is exclusively used by ferries on the Manly service. When the Freshwater class ferries were introduced in the 1980s, the wharf was rebuilt to accommodate their onboard gangways. It has a mezzanine level allowing ferries to disembark passengers from their upper decks. It also houses an office for Transdev Sydney Ferries. To better accommodate the larger ferries, wharf 3 is built higher from the water and this combined with differently configured Opal card readers and gates, means only Manly ferries can use the wharf.

Wharves 2 West, 4 and 5 are used interchangeably by Sydney Ferries.

== Ferry services ==
| Platform | Line | Stopping pattern | Notes |
| 2 | MFF | Side A: Fast ferry shuttle to Manly | |
| 2 | Double Bay ferry service | Side B: Direct service to Double Bay in Mornings; Stops at Darling Point and Double Bay in the Afternoon | |
| 2 | Watsons Bay ferry service | Side B: Peak hour weekday services to Rose Bay Only; Off-peak and Weekend all stops Services to Watsons Bay | |
| 3 | Manly ferry service | Side A: Shuttle to Manly | |
| 3 | Manly ferry service | Side B: Shuttle to Manly using Freshwater-class ferries | |
| 4 | Taronga Zoo ferry service | Shuttle to Taronga Zoo | |
| 4 | Neutral Bay ferry service | All Stops to Neutral Bay | |
| 4 | Mosman Bay ferry service | All stops to Mosman Bay | |
| 5 | Parramatta River ferry service | Weekdays to Sydney Olympic Park, Rydalmere or Parramatta using various stopping patterns, Some peak hour trips to Chiswick via Balmain or Balmain West; Weekends to Barangaroo, Cockatoo Island then all stops to Sydney Olympic Park or Parramatta | |
| 5 | Pyrmont Bay ferry service | All stops to Pyrmont Bay | |
| 5 | Cockatoo Island ferry service | All stops to Cockatoo Island; 1 Service at 11:45PM to Woolwich on weekdays only | |
| 6 | CCLC | Captain Cook Cruises service to Hunters Hill | |
| 6 | Harbour Explorer | Captain Cook Cruises service Darling Harbour to Fort Denison, Taronga Zoo, Watsons Bay & Manly | |
| 6 | CCWB | Captain Cook Cruises Watsons Bay Rocket | |
| 6 | MDH | Tourist Hop on/Hop off service around Sydney Harbour; During evenings only Manly Darling Harbour Loop Service | |

== Transport links ==
External image
- Map of Circular Quay Interchange (PDF) by Transport for New South Wales, updated 2020.

The Circular Quay ferry wharf complex is adjacent to an elevated railway station of the same name. The station is served by Sydney Trains services on the T2 Leppington & Inner West Line, T3 Liverpool & Inner West Line and T8 Airport & South Line.

South of the railway station is the Alfred Street bus terminus. A number of Transdev John Holland routes originate from there while two Big Bus Tours routes depart from George Street just north of Alfred Street. There is also the terminus of the L2 and L3 Sydney Light Rail services, located west of the bus terminus, but still on Alfred Street.
