= Double Bay ferry service =

Transport in Sydney, Australia

F7 Double Bay

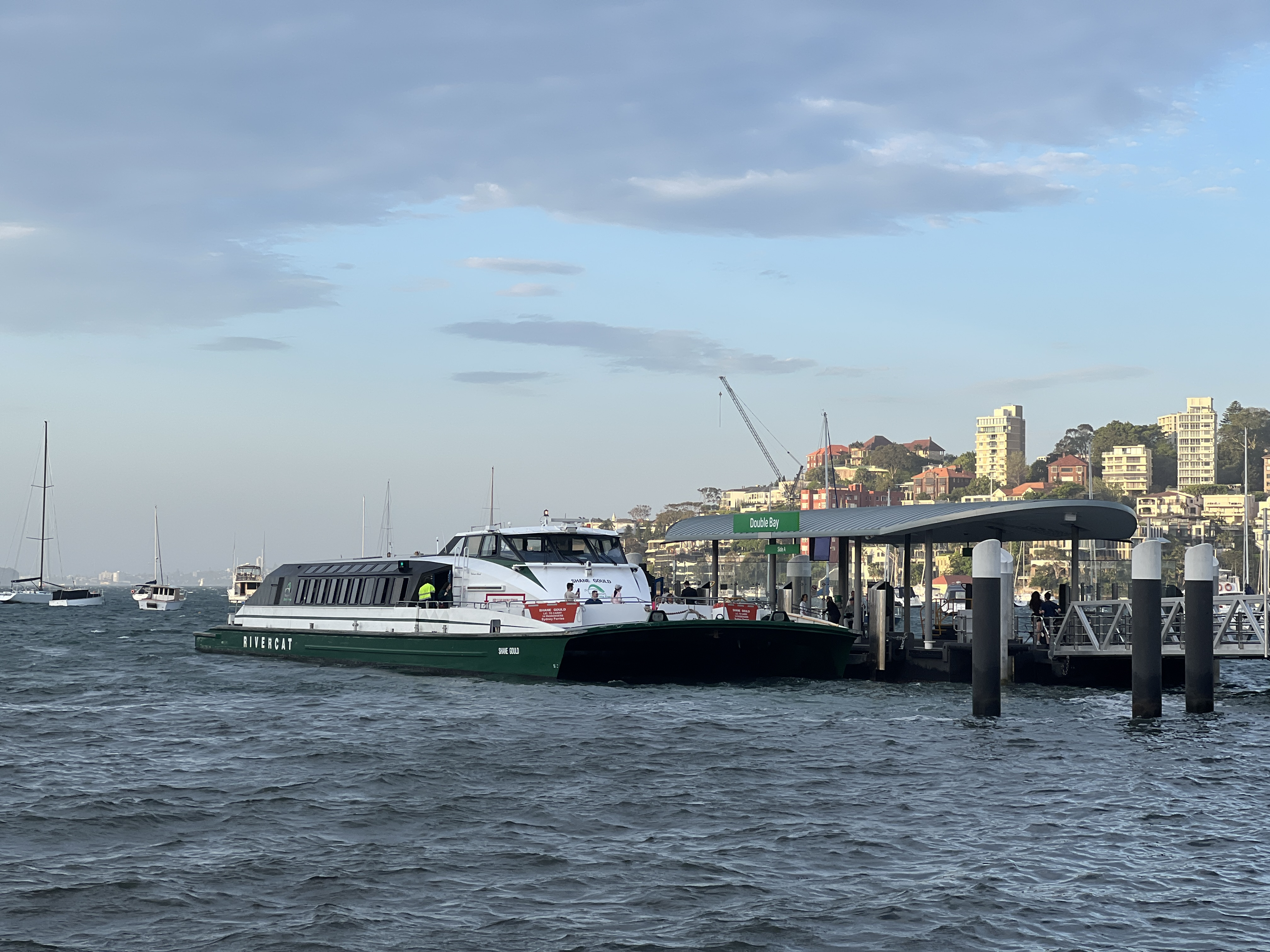
- A Rivercat-class ferry at Double Bay ferry wharf in September 2025
- Locale: Sydney
- Waterway: Sydney Harbour
- Fleet: First fleet class
- Owner: Sydney Ferries
- Operator: Transdev Sydney Ferries
- Authority: Transport for NSW

The Double Bay ferry service, officially known as F7 Double Bay, is a ferry service in Sydney, Australia. Part of the Sydney Ferries network, it is operated by Transdev Sydney Ferries from Circular Quay to Darling Point and Double Bay.

== History ==
In 1908, the Watsons Bay Co began operating a service from Circular Quay to Rose Bay via Darling Point and Double Bay. In 1925, a service from Fort Macquarie to Double Bay commenced.

In 1992, some peak hour State Transit Authority services from Circular Quay to Rose Bay began to call at Double Bay. By 2002 off-peak services had been introduced with SuperCats calling at Garden Island, Darling Point, Double Bay and Rose Bay.

In October 2013, the Eastern Suburbs service received the F7 classification as part of a numbering of all Sydney ferry services. In November 2017 the service was restructured. Services to Garden Island, Darling Point and Double Bay became the F7 Double Bay service, while the Watsons Bay service was merged with the F4 Pyrmont Bay service to become the F4 Cross Harbour service.

Ferries do not stop at Garden Island Wharf because Garden Island is not open to the public.

In the morning, ferries towards Circular Quay stop at Darling Point while ferries to Double Bay skip Darling Point. In the afternoon, ferries stop at Darling Point towards Double Bay and skip it going to Circular Quay.

In August 2025 Garden Island ferry wharf was removed from the Sydney ferries network and the Double Bay service 11 years later after closing in 2014.

== Wharves ==
| Name | Suburbs served | Information on wharf | Photo of wharf |
|---|---|---|---|
| Circular Quay | Sydney CBD, The Rocks | Circular Quay wharf is located at the northern end of the Sydney central business district. The locality of Circular Quay is a major Sydney transport hub, with a large ferry, heavy rail, light rail and bus interchange. Services to Double Bay usually leave from Wharf 2 | |
| Darling Point | Darling Point | Darling Point ferry wharf is a wharf located on the southern side of Sydney Harbour serving the Sydney suburb of Darling Point. | |
| Double Bay | Double Bay | Double Bay ferry wharf is located on the southern side of Sydney Harbour serving the Sydney suburb of Double Bay. The Australian 18 Footers League maintains a function centre adjacent to the wharf. This is the last stop for the F7 ferry route. | |

== Patronage ==
The following table shows the patronage of Sydney Ferries network for the year 2025.

2025-26 Sydney Ferries annual patronage by line (Note: Figures based on Opal tap on and tap off data)
| Manly ferry service | 4,532,938 | View source data. |
| Taronga Zoo ferry service | 1,545,805 | View source data. |
| Parramatta River ferry service | 2,429,310 | View source data. |
| Pyrmont Bay ferry service | 2,779,319 | View source data. |
| Neutral Bay ferry service | 562,998 | View source data. |
| Mosman Bay ferry service | 709,762 | View source data. |
| Double Bay ferry service | 273,741 | View source data. |
| Cockatoo Island ferry service | 535,934 | View source data. |
| Watsons Bay ferry service | 1,873,854 | View source data. |
| Blackwattle Bay ferry service | 17,970 | |
