= Darling Point ferry wharf =

Ferry wharf

Darling Point
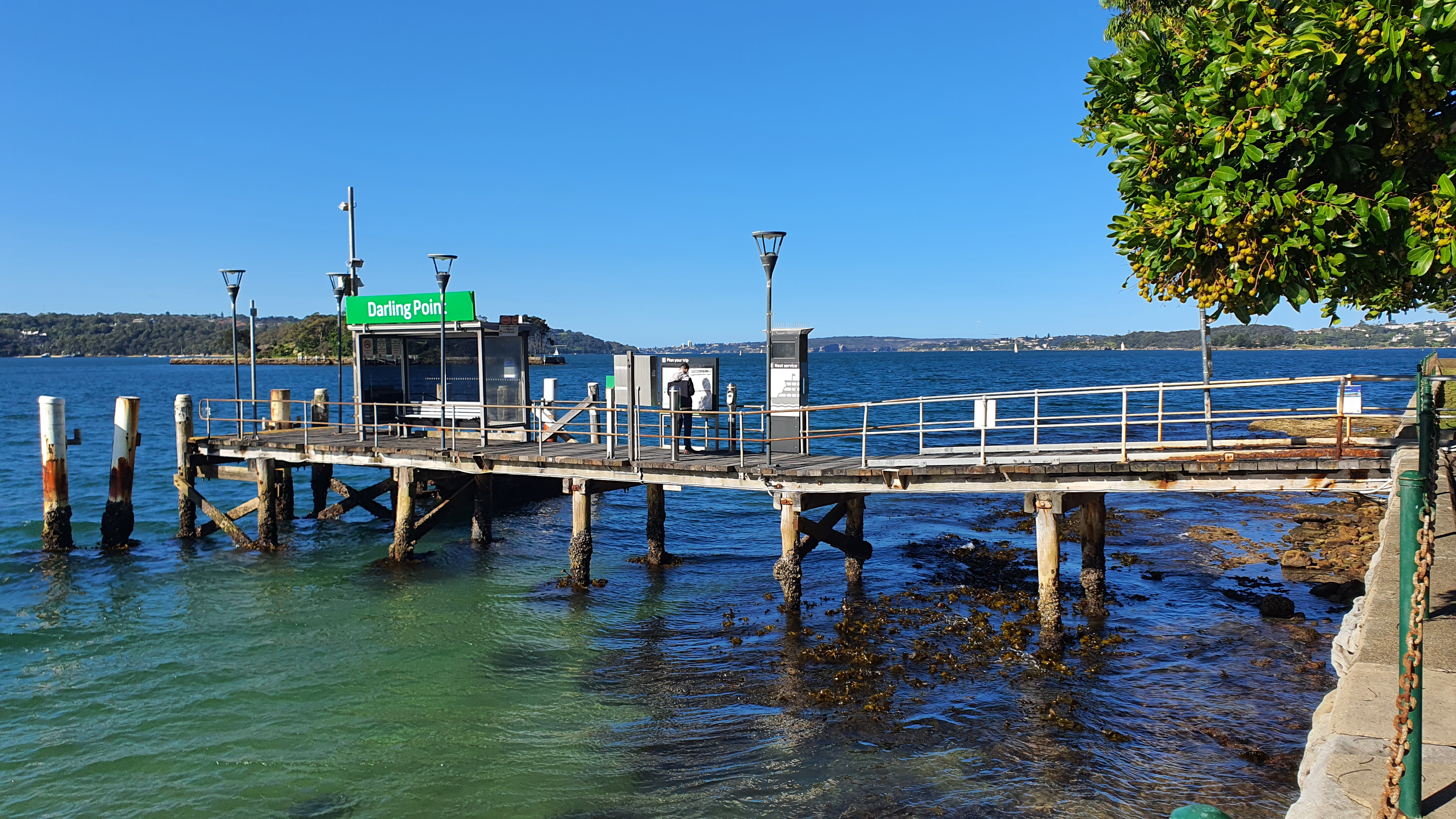
- View of the wharf from McKell Park in 2023

General information
- Location: McKell Park, Darling Point; New South Wales; Australia
- Coordinates: 33°51′59″S 151°14′22″E
- Owner: Transport for NSW
- Operator: Transdev Sydney Ferries
- Platforms: 1 wharf (1 berth)

Other information
- Status: Unstaffed

Services
Preceding wharf	Sydney Ferries	Following wharf
Circular Quay Terminus	F7 Double Bay	Double Bay Terminus
Location

Darling Point ferry wharf is a wharf located on the southern side of Sydney Harbour serving the Sydney suburb of Darling Point.

== Services ==
Darling Point wharf is served by peak-hour Sydney Ferries Double Bay services operated by First Fleet ferries.

Platform	Line	Stopping pattern	Notes
1	Double Bay ferry service	Afternoon services to Double Bay; Morning services to Circular Quay	
