= Watsons Bay ferry wharf =

Ferry wharf in Sydney

Watsons Bay
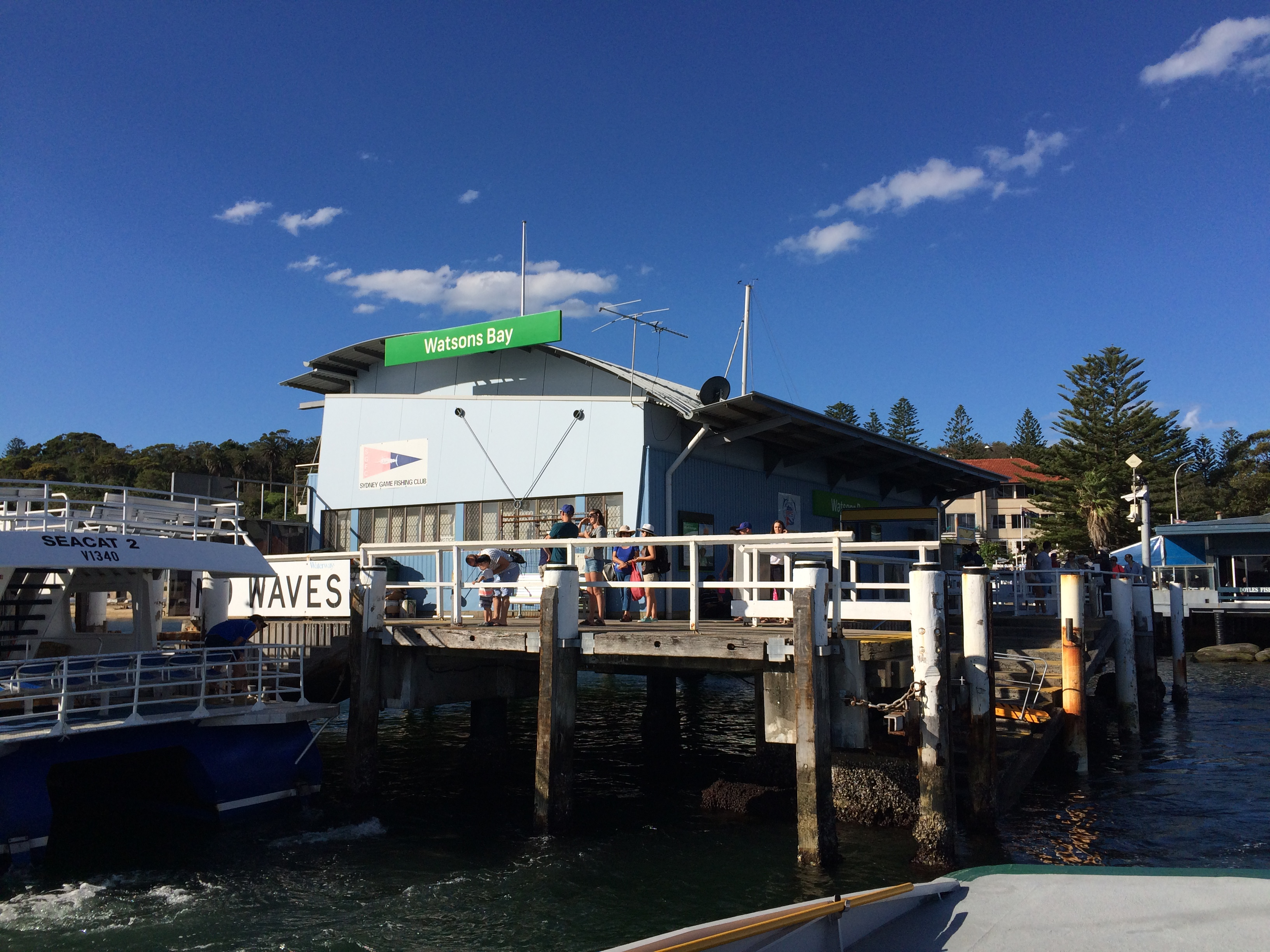
- Watsons Bay ferry wharf in April 2017

General information
- Location: Military Road, Watsons Bay; New South Wales; Australia
- Coordinates: 33°50′36″S 151°16′52″E
- Owner: Transport for NSW
- Operator: Transdev Sydney Ferries
- Platforms: 1 wharf (2 berths)
- Connections: Bus services

Other information
- Status: Unstaffed

Services
Preceding wharf	Sydney Ferries	Following wharf
Rose Bay towards Circular Quay	F9 Watsons Bay	Terminus
Location

Watsons Bay ferry wharf is located on the southern side of Sydney Harbour serving the Sydney suburb of Watsons Bay.

== Services ==
Watsons Bay wharf was served by Sydney Ferries Limited services from Circular Quay until withdrawn in 1933. Weekend only services were reintroduced by the Urban Transit Authority on 1 February 1987. By 2002 it was operating daily.

Today it is served by Sydney Ferries Watsons Bay services operated by Emerald-class ferries.

Watsons Bay wharf is also served by Captain Cook Cruises peak hour commuter services to Circular Quay. At other times the Captain Cook Cruises Hop On/Hop Off Sydney Harbour ferry service operates via Watsons Bay wharf.

Fantasea Cruising operates Sydney Harbour tourist services via Watsons Bay.

Platform	Line	Stopping pattern	Notes
1	Watsons Bay ferry service	to Circular Quay	
1	CCWB	to Circular Quay	peak hour only
1	Captain Cook Cruises Harbour Explorer	op on/Hop off around Sydney Harbour	
1	Fantasea Cruising cruises	Tourist Hop on/Hop off service around Sydney Harbour	

== Transport links ==
Transdev John Holland operates three bus routes from the other side of Robertson Park, under contract to Transport for NSW:

- 324: to Walsh Bay via Vaucluse
- 325: to Walsh Bay via Nielsen Park
- 380: to Bondi Junction via Bondi Beach
