= Double Bay ferry wharf =

Sydney Ferries ferry wharf

Double Bay
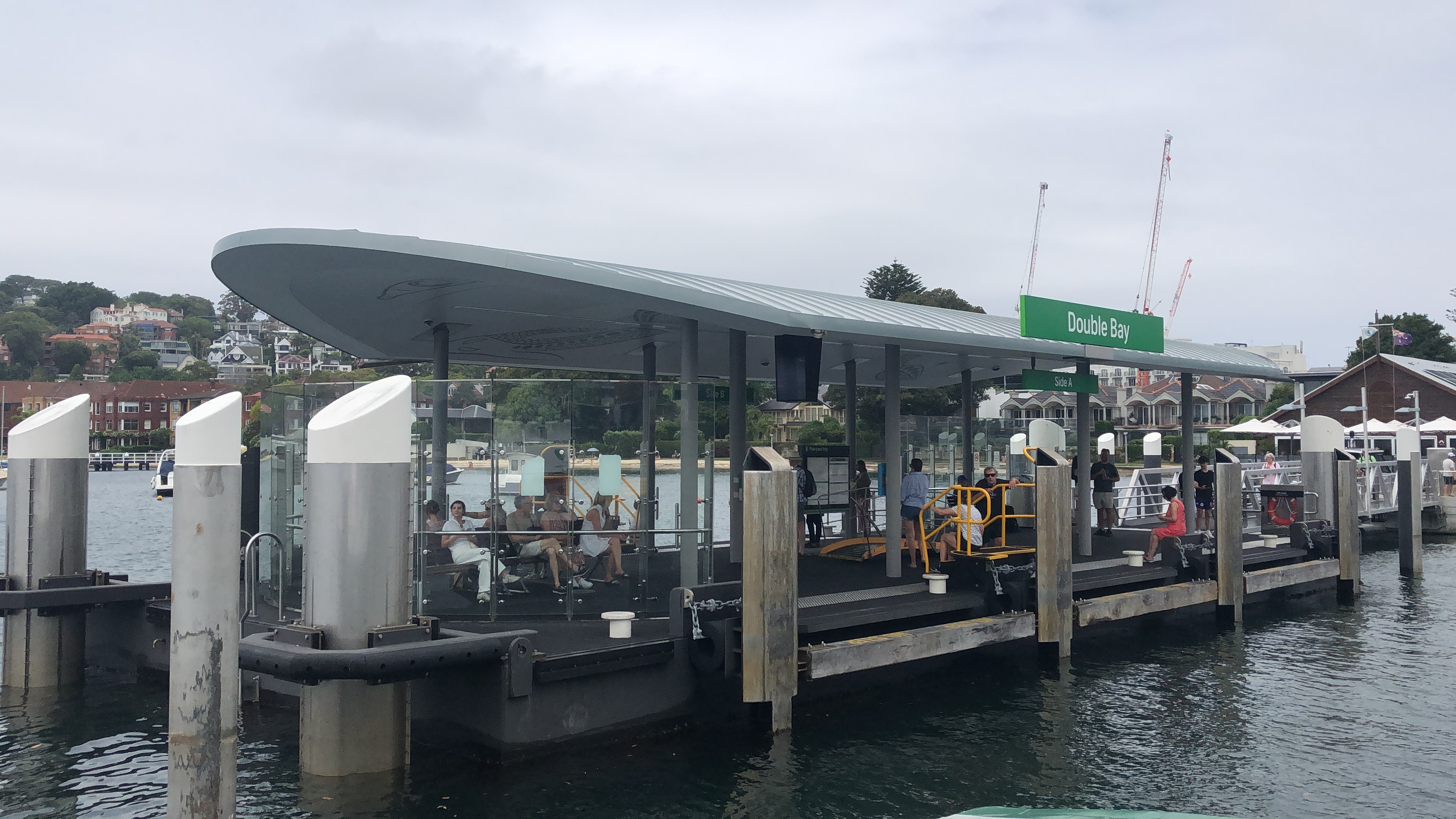
- Wharf in December 2024

General information
- Location: Bay Street, Double Bay; New South Wales; Australia
- Coordinates: 33°52′24″S 151°14′33″E
- Owner: Transport for NSW
- Operator: Transdev Sydney Ferries
- Platforms: 1 wharf (2 berths)

Other information
- Status: Unstaffed

History
- Rebuilt: 2023

Services
| Preceding wharf | Sydney Ferries | Following wharf |
|---|---|---|
| Darling Point towards Circular Quay | F7 Double Bay | Terminus |
Location

Double Bay ferry wharf is located on the southern side of Sydney Harbour serving the Sydney suburb of Double Bay. The Australian 18 Footers League maintain a function centre adjacent to the wharf.

Between May and December 2023 Double Bay wharf was temporally closed while the Wharf was rebuilt to be fully accessible which connects with Cafe 18 and now features 2 berths.

== Services ==
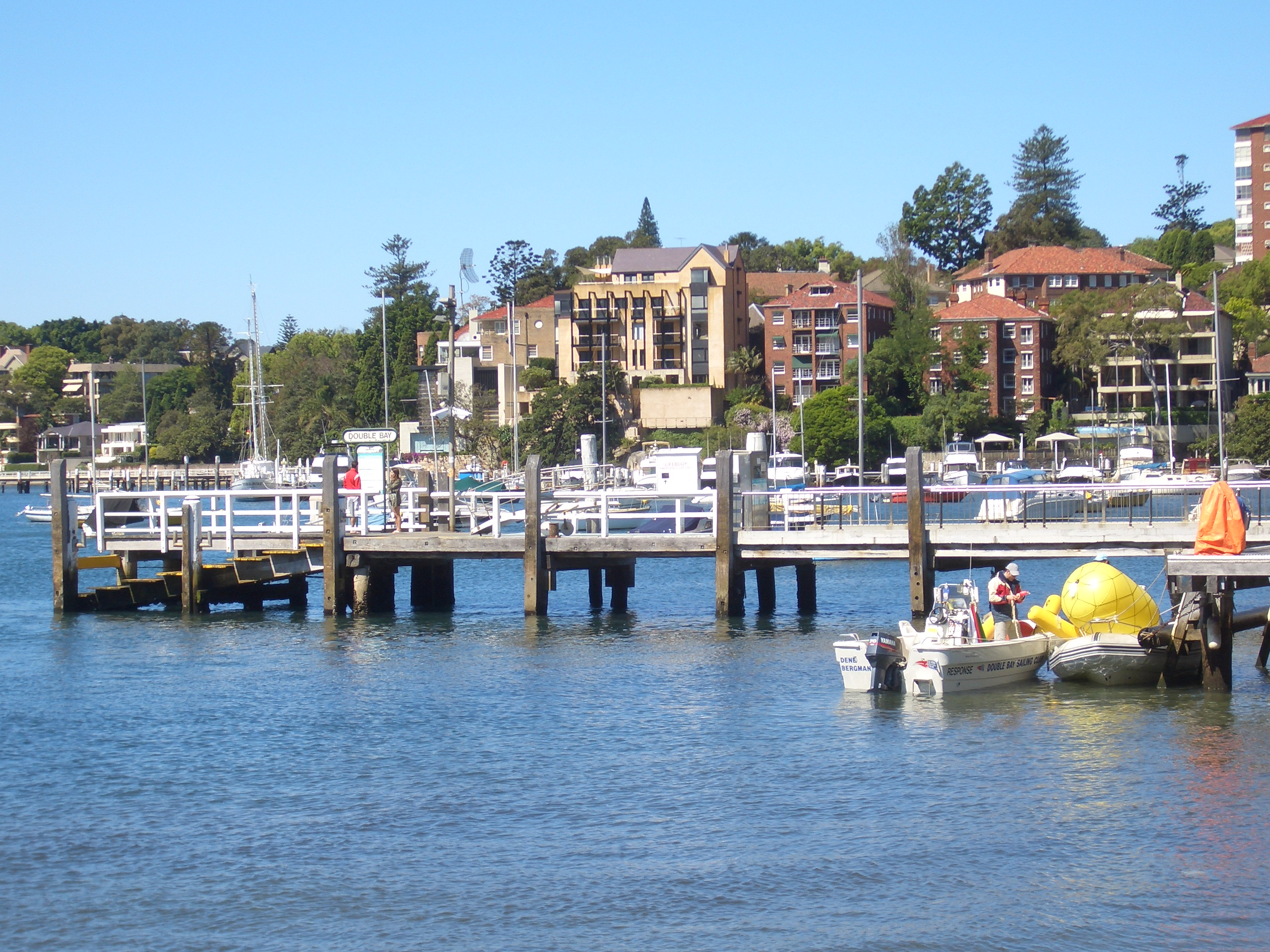
Double Bay Wharf before the rebuilt (October 2007)

Double Bay wharf is served by Sydney Ferries Double Bay services operated by First Fleet ferries.

| Platform | Line | Stopping pattern | Notes |
| 1 | Double Bay ferry service | To Circular Quay via either or both Darling Point; Late afternoon direct to Circular Quay | |
