= Taronga Zoo ferry service =

Ferry Route in Australia

F2 Taronga Zoo

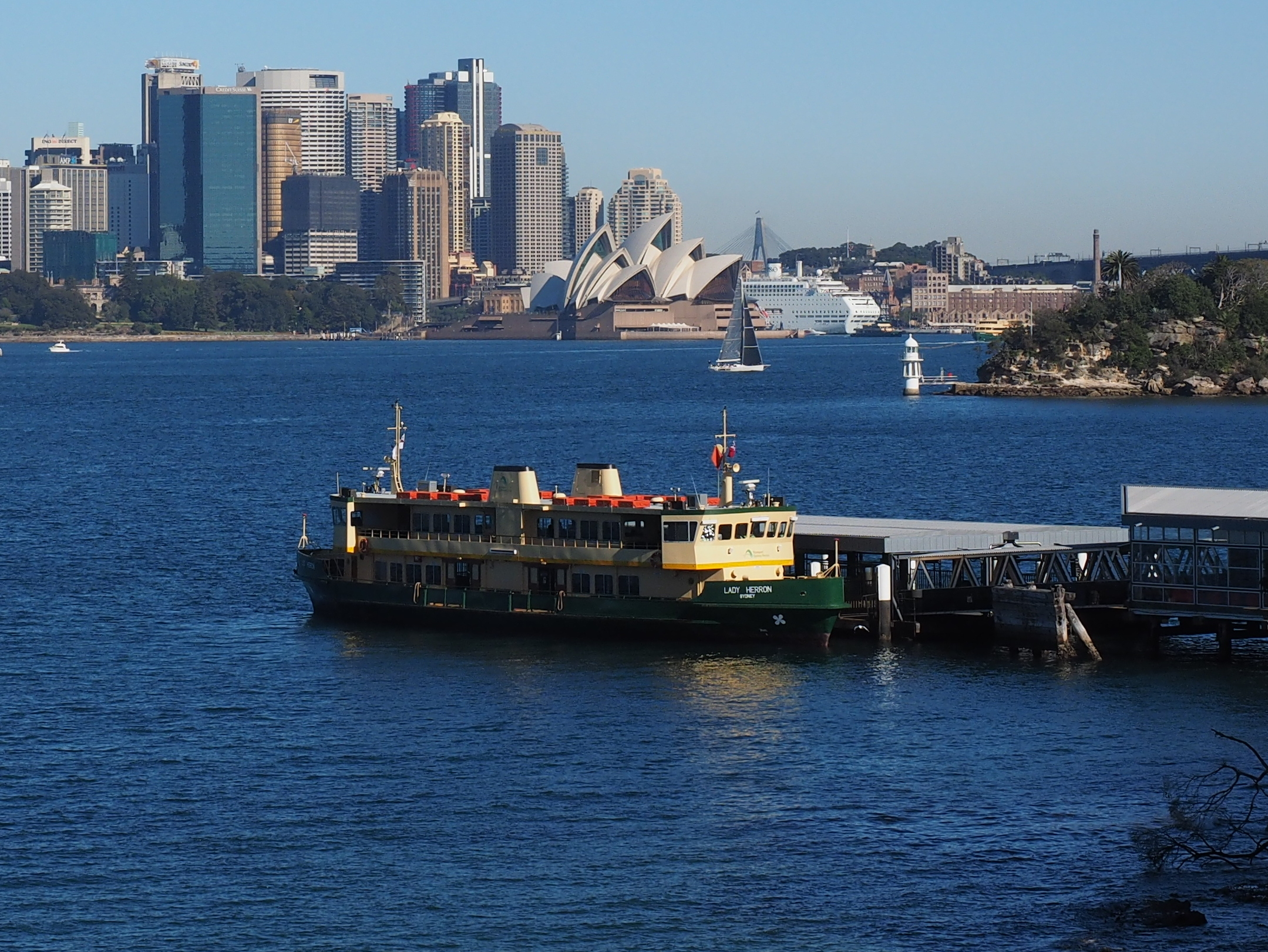
- The ferry Lady Herron at Taronga Zoo wharf ready to go back to Circular Quay in 2017
- Waterway: Sydney Harbour
- Owner: Sydney Ferries
- Operator: Transdev Sydney Ferries
- System length: 2 wharves 3.3 km
- No. of vessels: 2

The Taronga Zoo ferry service is a ferry route in Sydney, New South Wales, Australia. It connects Taronga Zoo with the transport hub at Circular Quay. The route forms part of the Sydney Ferries network. In 2013, the Taronga Zoo ferry service was given the designation of F2 as part of a program to number all Sydney Ferries, Sydney Trains and light rail lines. Some F2 Taronga Zoo services are combined with F6 Mosman services, extending to Mosman Bay.

== History ==
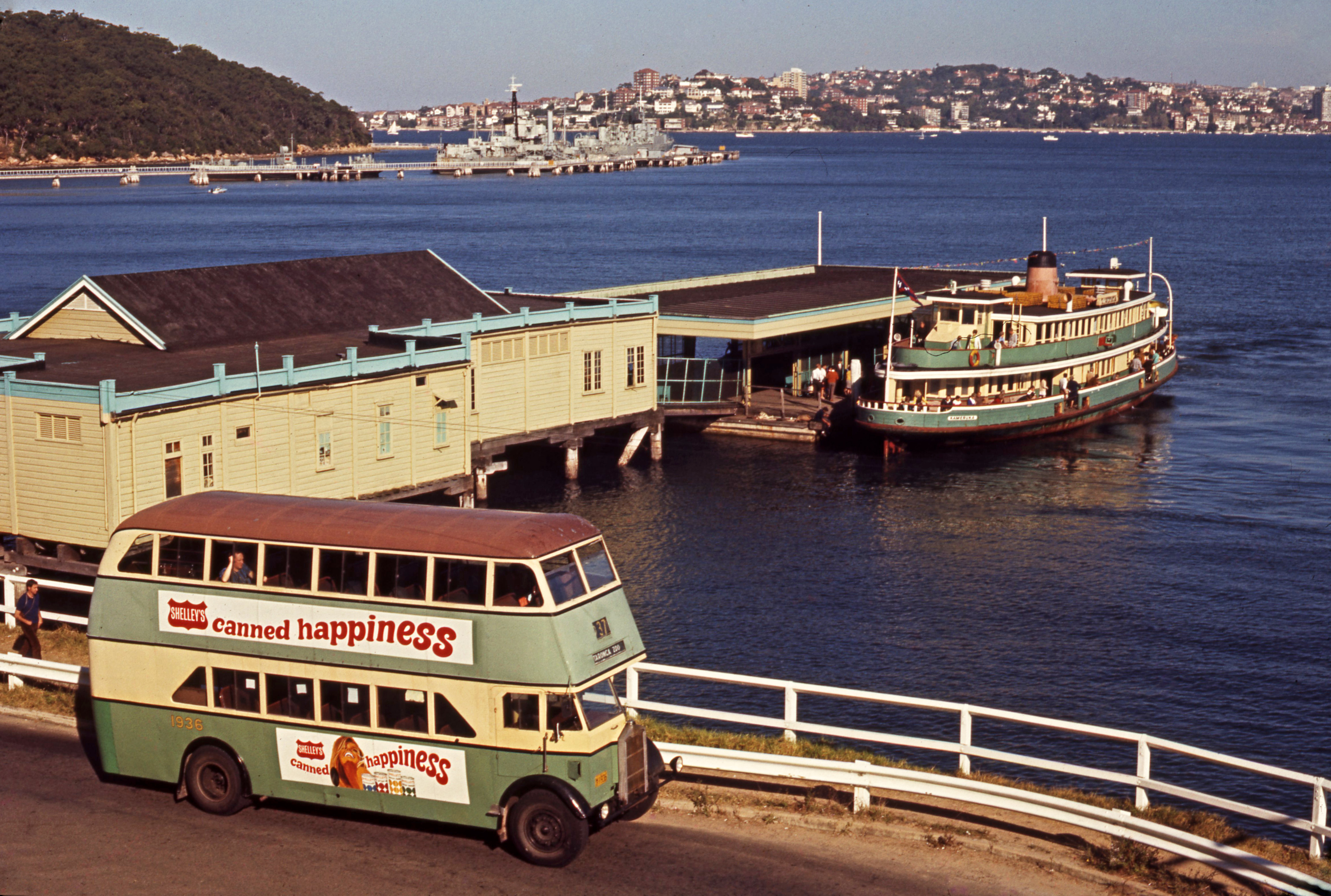
Taronga Zoo wharf, then known as Athol Wharf, in the 1970s with ferry, Kameruka

The first service to Taronga Zoo commenced on 24 September 1916 with a vehicular ferry taking the elephant 'Jessi' across the harbour to her new home from the old zoo at Moore Park.

== Services ==
=== Wharves ===
Wharves served by the F2 ferry

==== Circular Quay ====
Circular Quay is a major Sydney transport hub, with a large ferry, rail and bus interchange. F2 Taronga Zoo services usually depart from Wharf 4. The wharves are wheelchair-accessible.

==== Taronga Zoo ====
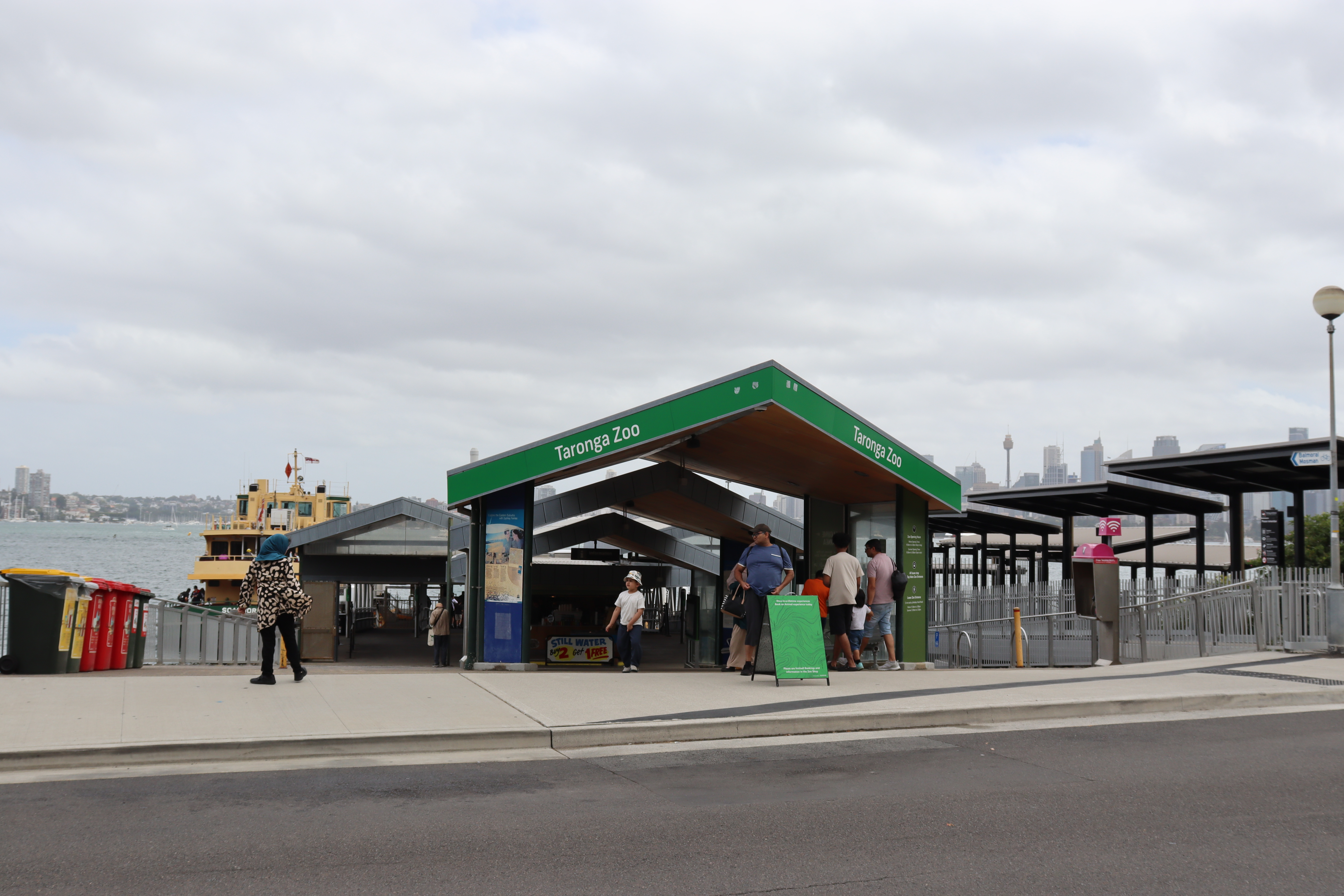
The Taronga Zoo ferry wharf

The Taronga Zoo ferry wharf is, for many tourists, the preferred mode of entry to Sydney's major zoological park. Passengers disembarking at the wharf, located on Bradleys Head Road, can enter the zoo via a cable car or connect with local bus services. The wharf is wheelchair-accessible.

=== Patronage ===
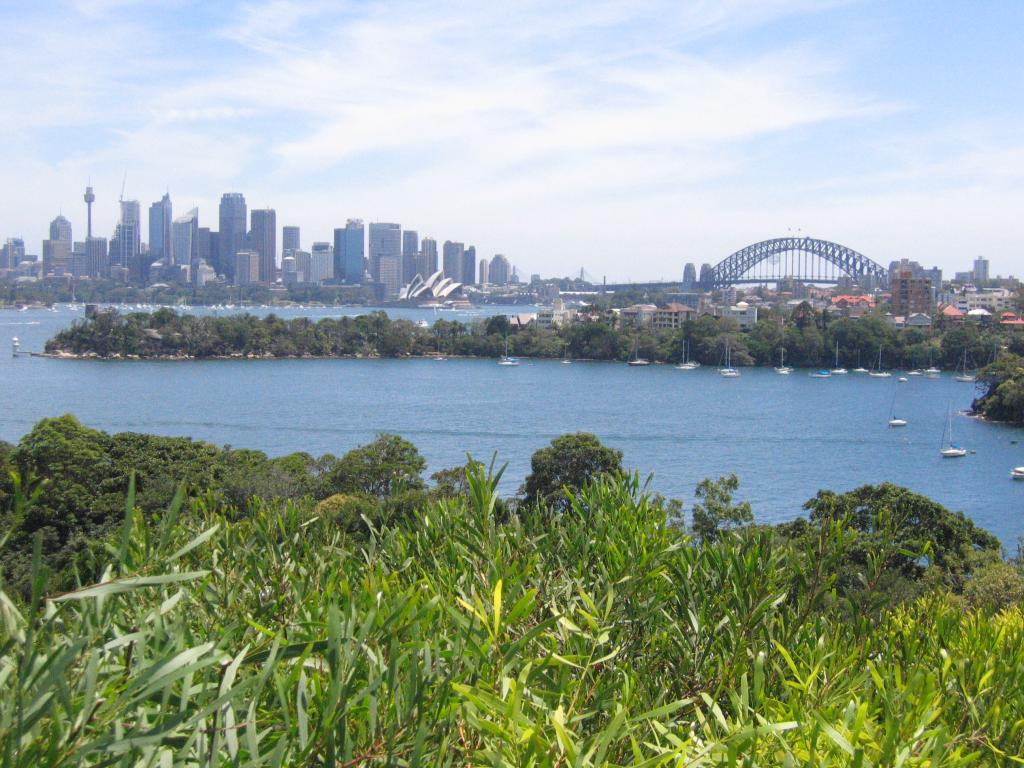
Taronga Zoo is one of Sydney's premier harbourside attractions.

The following table shows the patronage of Sydney Ferries network for the year 2025.

2025-26 Sydney Ferries annual patronage by line (Note: Figures based on Opal tap on and tap off data)
Manly ferry service	4,532,938	View source data.
Taronga Zoo ferry service	1,545,805	View source data.
Parramatta River ferry service	2,429,310	View source data.
Pyrmont Bay ferry service	2,779,319	View source data.
Neutral Bay ferry service	562,998	View source data.
Mosman Bay ferry service	709,762	View source data.
Double Bay ferry service	273,741	View source data.
Cockatoo Island ferry service	535,934	View source data.
Watsons Bay ferry service	1,873,854	View source data.
Blackwattle Bay ferry service	17,970	
