= Sydney SuperCats =

Class of catamarans

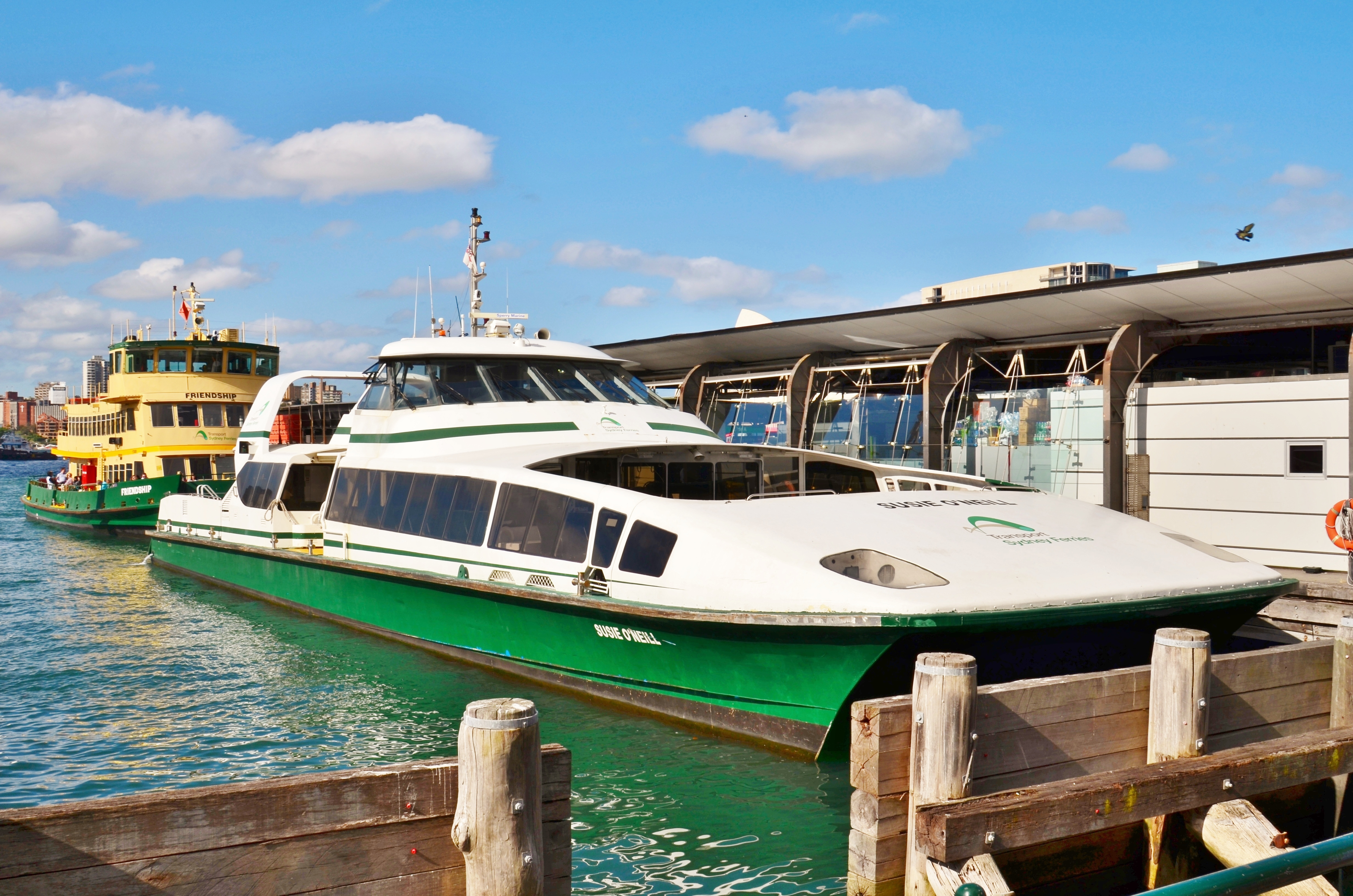
- Susie O'Neill at Circular Quay in 2017

Class overview
- Builders: Australian Defence Industries
- Operators: Sydney Ferries; Transdev Sydney Ferries
- Planned: 8
- Completed: 4
- Active: 0
- Retired: 4

General characteristics
- Type: Catamaran
- Length: 34.2 m (112 ft)
- Speed: 26 kn (48 km/h; 30 mph)
- Capacity: 326

The Sydney SuperCats were a class of catamarans operated by Transdev Sydney Ferries on Sydney Harbour.

== History ==
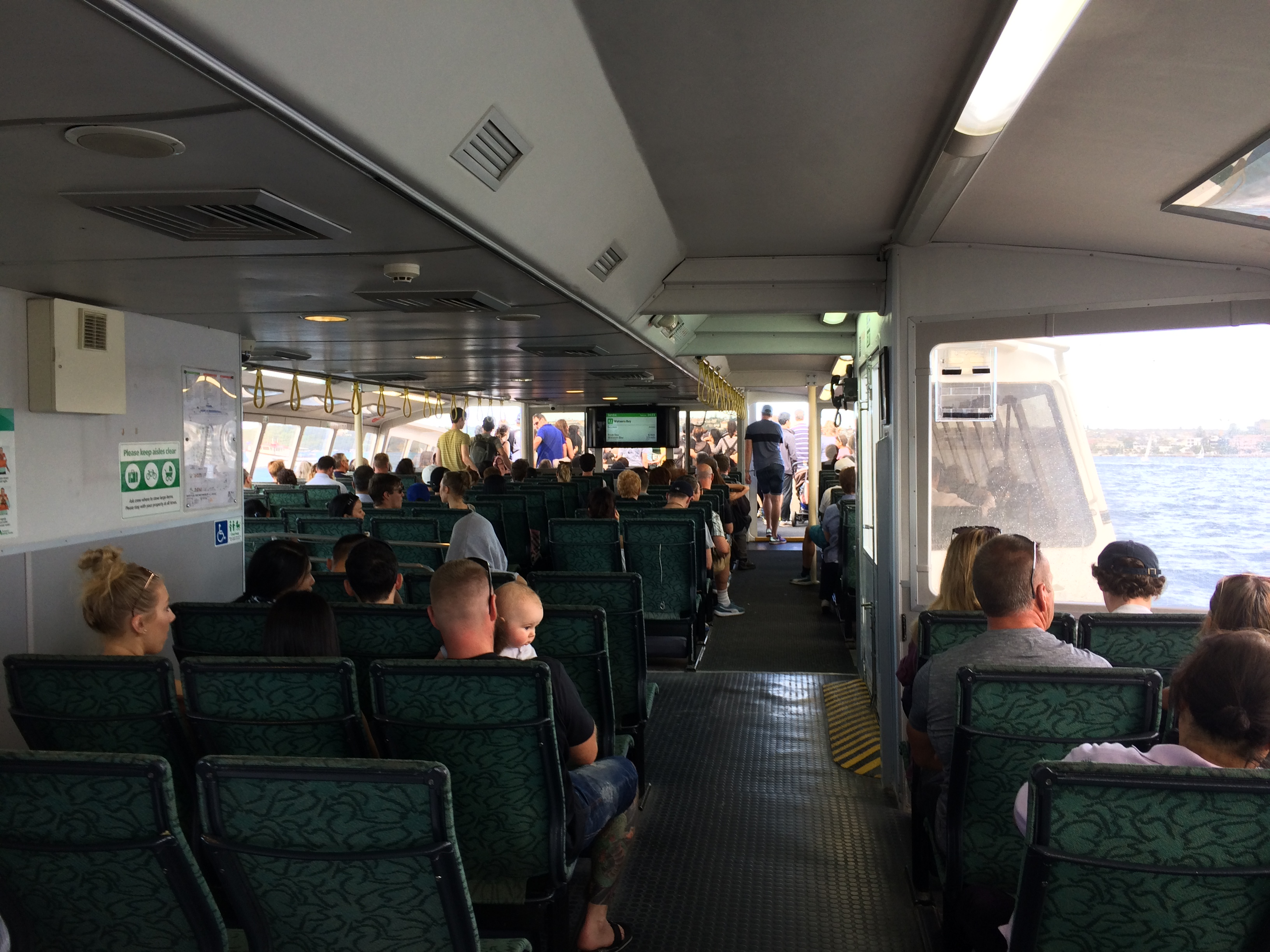
Interior

In 2000 and 2001, the State Transit Authority purchased four SuperCats. Initially eight were ordered, but the final four were cancelled. All were built by Australian Defence Industries at Garden Island.

They primarily operated on Eastern Suburbs services and were on occasion used on the Manly run. The upper deck was closed at night time.

In 2019 a new class of ferries known as the River-class were announced, with the new class to replace the SuperCats and HarbourCats. In December 2021 SuperCat Saint Mary Mackillop was retired from passenger service, after a few River-class ferries entered service from October 2021. On 31 August 2022 Susie O'Neill was retired with Louise Sauvage being the next to retire on 22 March 2024. On 28 April 2024 SuperCat 4 was retired and left for Newcastle after being sold. Two of the vessels are inactive awaiting buyers. Saint Mary Mackillop was sold to a party boat company in Geelong and renamed Hygeia IV where it now serves as a charter party boat.Susie O'Neill was sold to ZigZag Whitsundays in November 2024 and renamed Super Flyer where it now serves as a day tour from Airlie Beach to Whitehaven Beach.

== Vessels ==
Name	Call sign	MMSI	Year in service	Namesake	Fate
Saint Mary Mackillop	21822	503374400	2000	Mary Mackillop	Retired 2021 - Sold and renamed "Hygeia IV"
Susie O'Neill	21852	503374600	2000	Susie O'Neill	Retired 2022 - Sold to ZigZag Whitsundays in 2024 and renamed "Super Flyer"
Louise Sauvage	21906	503374700	2001	Louise Sauvage	Renamed “Louis” and sold to Coral Sea Cruises, Whitsundays.
SuperCat 4	21942	503374500	2001	Ferry class & vessel	Retired 2024 - Name changed to "Percat" and sold to Fiji.

== See also ==
- List of Sydney Harbour ferries
- Timeline of Sydney Harbour ferries
