= First Fleet-class ferry =

Class of Sydney ferry

First Fleet class
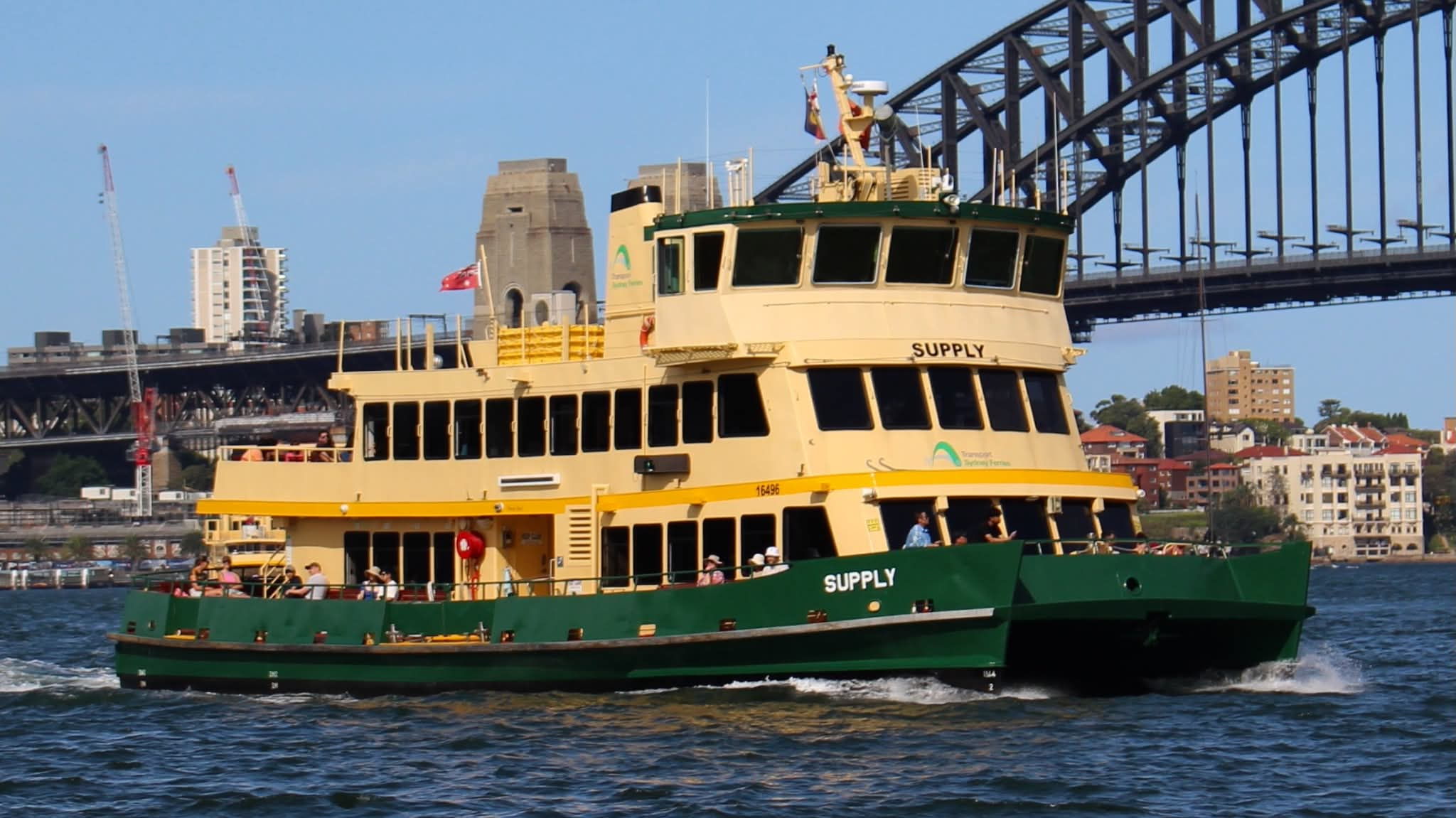
- Supply near Balmain East in 2025.

Class overview
- Builders: Carrington Slipways
- Operators: Urban Transit Authority; State Transit Authority; Sydney Ferries; Transdev Sydney Ferries
- Built: 1984–1986
- Completed: 9
- Active: 9

General characteristics
- Type: Catamaran
- Displacement: 83 tonnes
- Length: 25.4 m (83 ft)
- Propulsion: MTU Series 60
- Speed: 11 knots (20 km/h; 13 mph)
- Capacity: 393

The First Fleet class is a class of ferry operated by Transdev Sydney Ferries on Sydney Harbour.

== History ==
In the early 1980s, the Urban Transit Authority ordered nine catamaran ferries from Carrington Slipways, Tomago. They were to replace the K-class and wooden Lady class ferries on Sydney Harbour. The new vessels were named after ships of the First Fleet and were delivered between 1984 and 1986. It was originally intended that they would operate services on the Parramatta River, but they generated too much wash.

In 2006/07, the class were repowered with MTU Series 60 engines. As at November 2023, all nine remain in service with Transdev Sydney Ferries.

Between 2020 and 2022, eight of the ferries underwent life extension rebuilds to extend their lives for a further 10 years. The work was undertaken by Birdon at Port Macquarie and included new engines, refurbished interiors, the provision of air conditioning and additional safety features. The first vessel completed was the Golden Grove in June 2020.

First Fleet Class Ferries currently service F2 Taronga Zoo, F4 Pyrmont Bay, F5 Neutral Bay, F6 Mosman Bay, F7 Double Bay, F8 Cockatoo Island, and F9 Watsons Bay.

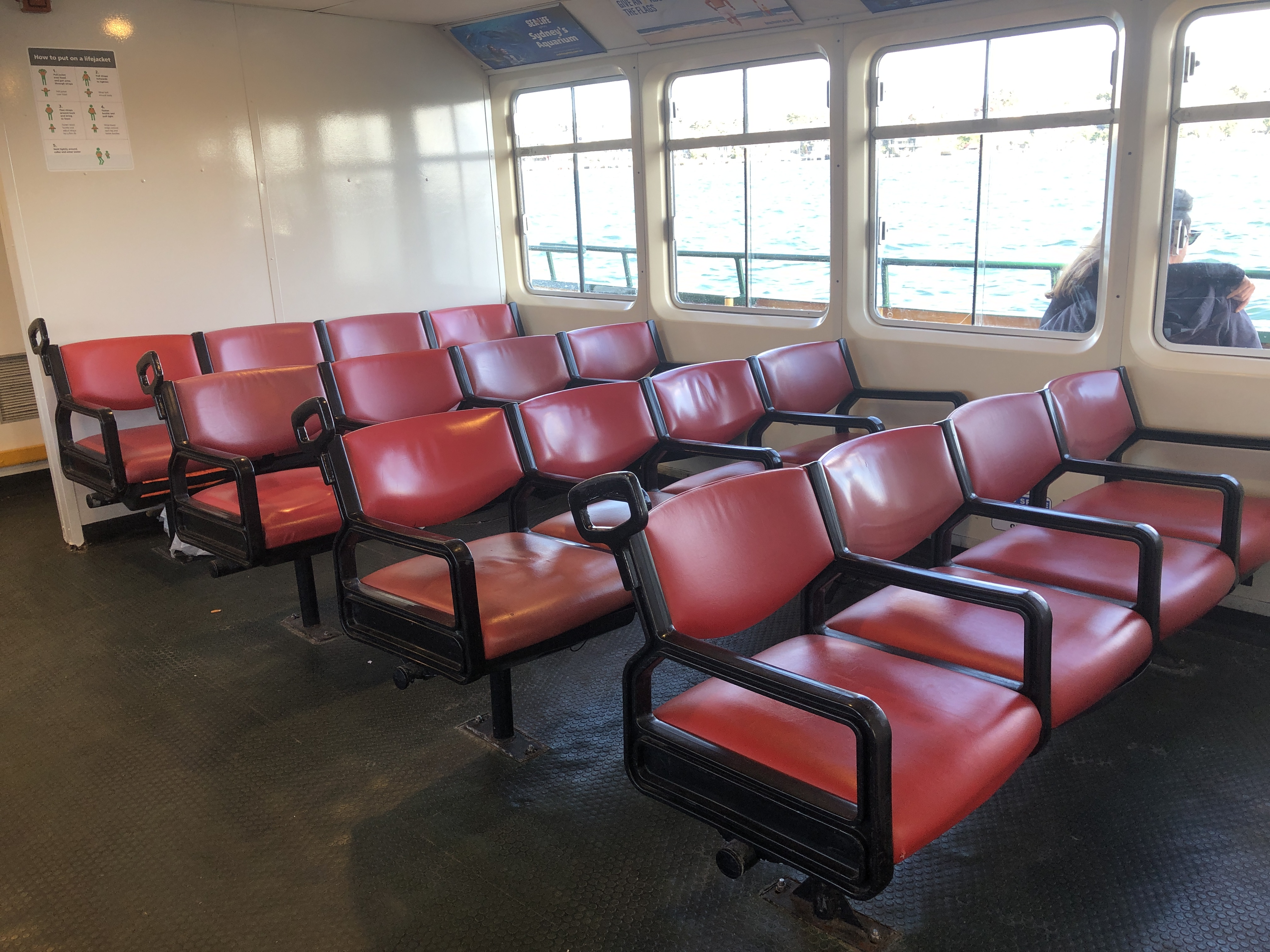
Interior of lower floor of Non Refurbished First Fleet Ferry

== Vessels ==
Photo of Vessel	Name	Call sign	MMSI	Shipyard no	Launched	Status	Namesake	Additional information
MV Supply	Supply	16496	503344800	164	10 December 1984	Active	HMS Supply	First vessel in service.
MV Sirius in 2026	Sirius	15622	503345700	163	20 August 1984	Active	HMS Sirius	First vessel launched. Had different handrails up until 2023 drydocking. One of 3 vessels surveyed to go to Manly.
MV Alexander in 2026	Alexander	15517	503344900	165	19 January 1985		Alexander	
MV Borrowdale in 2026	Borrowdale	16852	503345100	166	4 February 1985	Active	Borrowdale	Has a flattened bow unique to this vessel.
	Charlotte	17258	503345200	167	23 February 1985	Active	Charlotte	
MV Fishburn at Circular Quay	Fishburn	15519	503345300	176	31 August 1985	Active	Fishburn	One of 3 vessels surveyed to go to Manly.
MV Friendship in 2026	Friendship	17458	503345400		9 May 1986	Active	Friendship	Last vessel in service.
First Fleet Class Ferry Golden Grove	Golden Grove	16497	503345500	177	16 November 1985	Active	Golden Grove	The pattern of windows that open is different on this vessel. First to receive refit. One of 3 vessels surveyed to go to Manly.
	Scarborough	16814	503345600	178	1 February 1986	Active	Scarborough	
