= Sydney Ferries =

Public transport ferry service

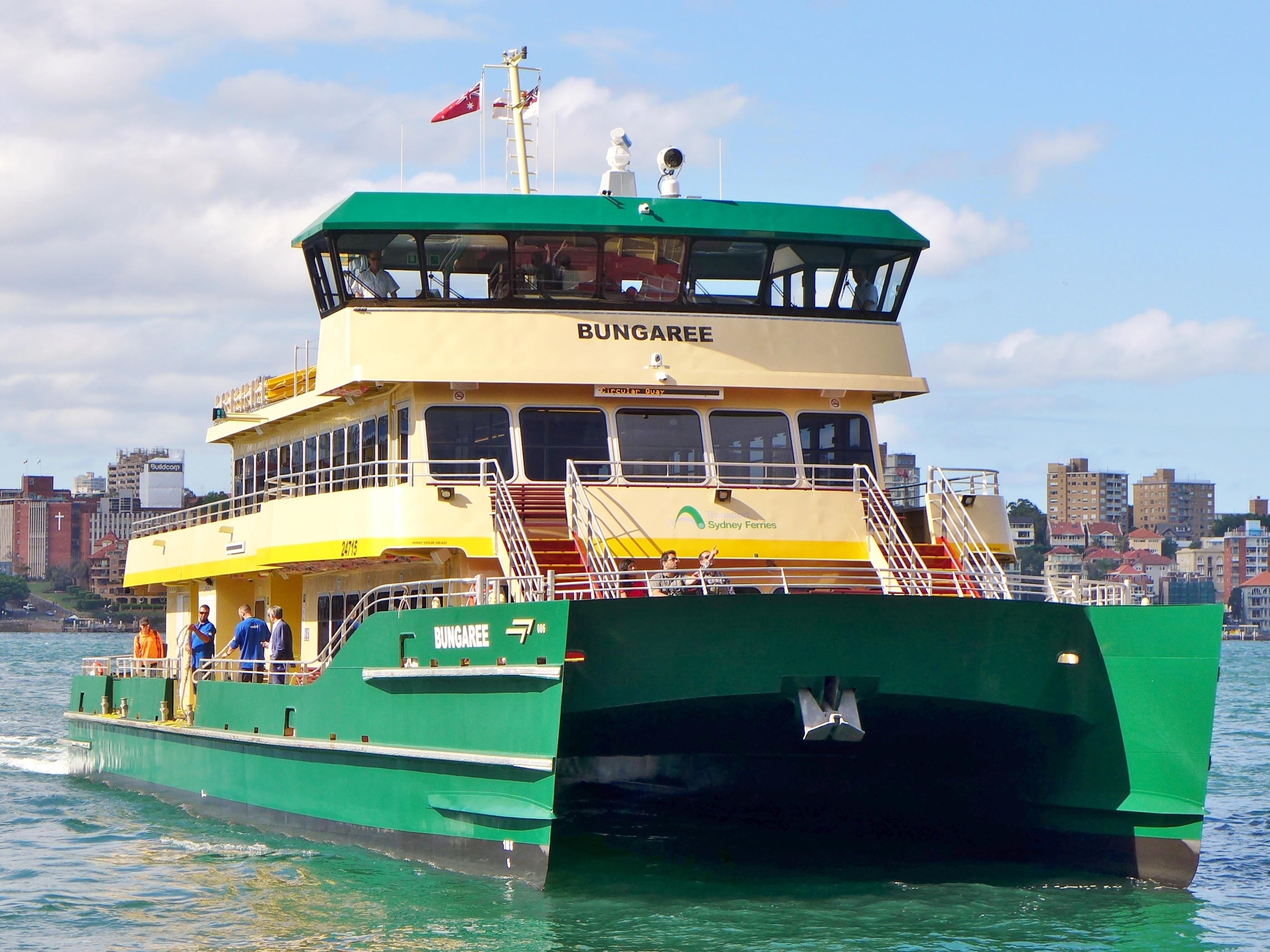
- An Emerald Class ferry

- Roundel

Overview
- Owner: Transport for NSW
- Area served: Port Jackson
- Locale: Sydney
- Transit type: Passenger ferry
- Number of lines: 10

Operation
- Operator: Transdev Sydney Ferries
- Number of vehicles: 39

House Flag

Sydney Ferries is the public transport ferry network serving the city of Sydney, New South Wales. Services operate on Sydney Harbour and the connecting Parramatta River. The network is controlled by the New South Wales Government's transport authority, Transport for NSW, and is part of the authority's Opal ticketing system. In 2015–16, 18.95 million passenger journeys were made on the network.

Services are operated under contract by Transdev Sydney Ferries. Sydney Ferries Corporation is the state government agency that owns the ferry fleet.

== History ==
=== Early services ===
Sydney's ferry services can trace their general origins as far back as the arrival of the First Fleet at Sydney Cove where in 1789, a small boat provided a link between Sydney Cove and the farming settlement of Parramatta. The first vessel, officially named the Rose Hill Packet (otherwise known as 'The Lump'), was a hoy crafted by convicts and powered by sails and oars. Return trips between Sydney Cove and Parramatta could take a week to complete.

The ex-convict, Billy Blue, thought to be a Jamaican, provided a cross harbour rowboat from Dawes Point to Blues Point. By 1830, he was running what is thought to be Sydney first regular ferry service. The same year, a regular service was set up between Balmoral Beach and Balgowlah that shortened the otherwise long bush journey between Sydney and Manly and the Northern Beaches. As time progressed, a series of rowboat ferrymen set up small operations to transport people from either side of Sydney Harbour. However, the first proper, steam-powered ferry services that could operate regardless of wind and tide appeared in the 1830s and 1840s.

=== Parramatta River services ===
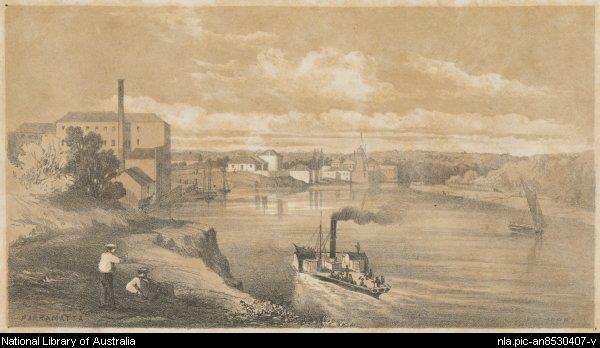
Comet, a paddle-steamer operated by the Parramatta River Steam Company on the Parramatta River in the 1850s

North Sydney was still not a heavily populated area in the 1830s, however, Parramatta was growing. The first Australian-built steamship, PS Surprise was launched in 1831 and commenced regular, timetabled services to Parramatta on 1 June 1831. The service, however, was not financially successful and the vessel was sold to Hobart in 1832. It was followed by numerous further steam ferries operated by various business partnerships until the Parramatta River Steam Co, was formed in 1865. Due to the considerable costs of building wharves, boatmen would wait for ferries along the river and row ferry passengers ashore for a fee. One of two punts near the current Gladesville Bridge was for river ferry passengers and was operated by boatmen. The other punt, Bedlam Ferry, carried main road traffic across the river.

=== Sydney Ferries Limited ===
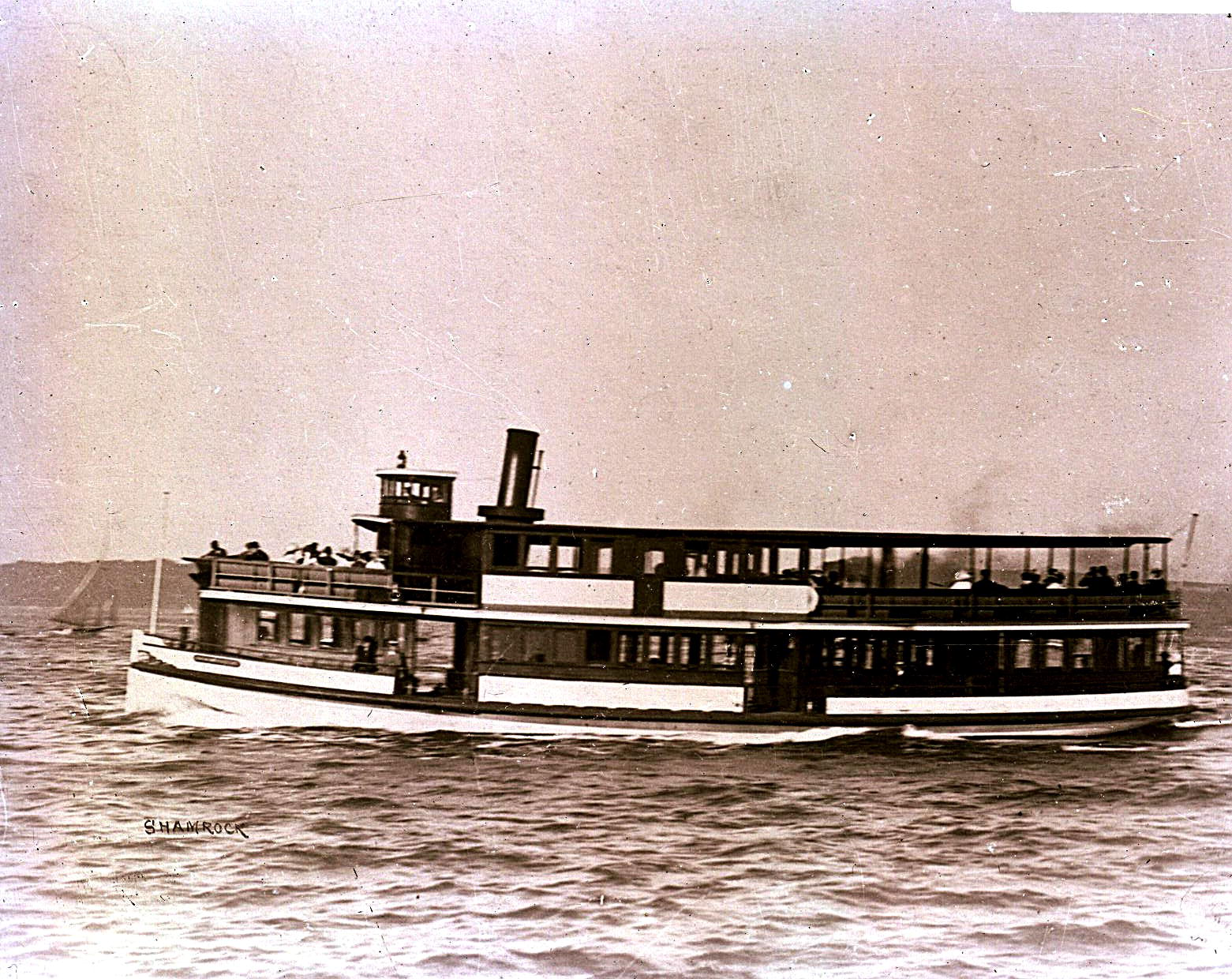
A Sydney Ferry SHAMROCK leaving Sydney Cove en route to Figtree, Lane Cove River, in 1901

Cross-harbour steam ferry services began in 1842 and this business grew to such an extent that a public company was formed, the North Shore Steam Ferry Co. Ltd. in 1878.

In 1900, the North Shore company was reincorporated as Sydney Ferries Limited (SFL), which progressively took over most other harbour ferry services (except notably the Manly service operated by the Port Jackson and Manly Steamship Company), and eventually became the world's largest ferry operator by fleet size and patronage. In addition to the vessels acquired in the takeovers, it procured in its own name over the following years some 30 large passenger and vehicular ferries known as the K-class. After the Sydney Harbour Bridge opened in March 1932, SFL patronage dropped almost overnight, decreasing from 44 to 20 million passengers per year.

=== Manly services ===
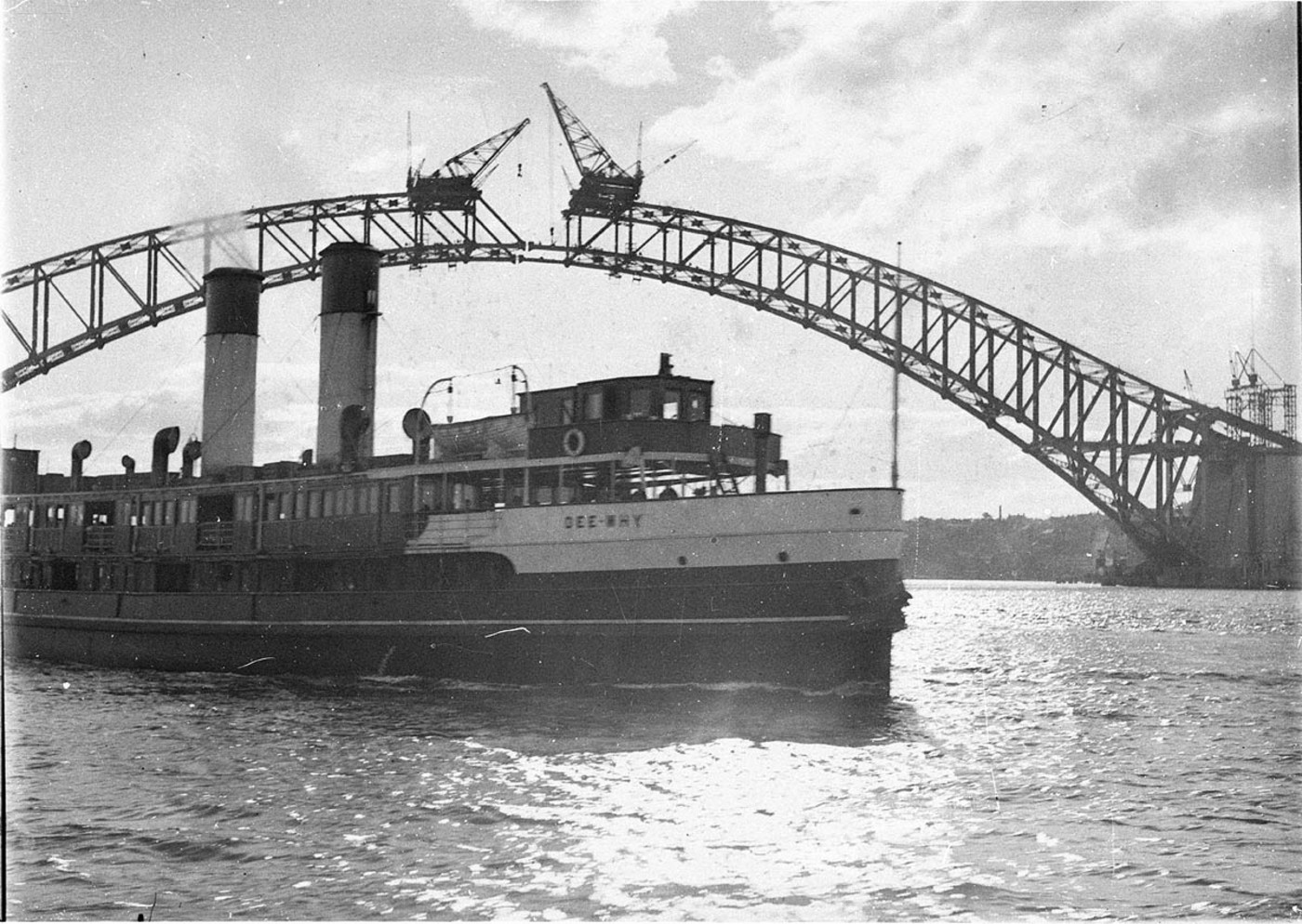
Dee Why in the early 1930s with the Sydney Harbour Bridge under construction

The first direct link between Sydney and Manly was arranged by Henry Gilbert Smith in 1855 when he chartered a paddle steamer, Huntress, to service the subdivision of his land near The Corso. Further ferries were chartered over following years until, in 1859, the first larger double-ender ferry on the Manly run, Phantom, was put into service by a new business partnership established to operate the ferries. Extra boats, including tugs, were also chartered for use on weekends and holidays due to the popularity of Manly's beaches and coves. A new company, Port Jackson Steamboat Co Limited, was formed in 1877. The company was reincorporated in 1881 as Port Jackson Steamship Co Limited, and further new vessels were acquired, the largest being the 1883 double-ended paddle steamer, Brighton. At 67 metres (220 ft) in length, it was the largest ferry on Sydney Harbour, and with a high level of appointment, it was a passenger favourite.

Manly (II) was designed by renowned naval architect, Walter Reeks and was the first double-ended screw ferry on the Manly run. In 1901, Reeks also designed the Kuring-gai, a steel, double-ended screw steamer that in its appearance, size and capacity, was the first of the familiar Manly ferries of the twentieth century. To meet the expanding demand, the now reincorporated Port Jackson and Manly Steamship Company commissioned six similar double-ended screw steamers: Binngarra (1905), Burra Bra (1908), Bellubera (1910), Balgowlah (1912), Barrenjoey (1913), and Baragoola (1922). In 1928, two new ferries built in Scotland, Curl Curl and Dee Why were commissioned. They were the largest and fastest ferries on the harbour until 1938 when the Company commissioned South Steyne also built in Scotland.

The three Scottish-built steamers and the remainder of the Binngarra type vessels were pulled out of service over the course of the 1960s and 1970s as the Manly service and its vessels declined. The exceptions, Baragoola and Barrenjoey (later renamed North Head), remained in service into the 1980s until the introduction of the Freshwater-class ferries which remain in service. In 1965, a hydrofoil service was introduced roughly halving the travel time of the ferries but with significantly higher fares. The hydrofoils were replaced in 1990 by Jetcats, however, these proved unreliable and expensive and were replaced by the current Manly fast ferry service.

=== Government takeover ===
In 1951, the NSW Government intervened in response to the financial difficulties of SFL and agreed to take over its fleet. The assets were taken over by the Sydney Harbour Transport Board with operations and maintenance contracted to the Port Jackson & Manly Steamship Company. In 1967, the first of the new Lady-class ferry were ordered. Brambles Transport Industries took over the Port Jackson & Manly Steam Ship Company. In 1974, the NSW State Government took over the services initially through the auspices of the Public Transport Commission (1974–1980), then the Urban Transit Authority (1980–1989), State Transit Authority (1989–2004) and Sydney Ferries Corporation (2004–2012).

=== The Walker Report ===
On 3 April 2007 the New South Wales Government appointed Bret Walker, a Senior Counsel, to undertake a commission of inquiry into Sydney Ferries' operations. Submissions to Walker's inquiry were critical of many aspects of the operation of Sydney Ferries from fare levels and infrequent services to the design of gangways and the choice of potentially unsafe livery colours for some vessels. Walker's report, delivered in November 2007, was highly critical of the Ferries' management, industrial relations and government interference. Walker made several major recommendations including the urgent replacement of the entire ageing fleet of vessels and handing day-to-day operations over to a private sector operator whilst the NSW Government retained the fleet and other assets in public ownership.

In 2008, the NSW Government called for private sector bids to provide ferry services under a services contract, however the government later decided to keep Sydney Ferries as a state owned and operated entity. On 1 January 2009, Sydney Ferries ceased to be a state-owned corporation and became a NSW Government agency.

In February 2009, private operator Manly Fast Ferry took over the high speed jet cat service to Manly. In April 2010, the NSW Government decided the service contract would remain with the Sydney Ferries Corporation.

=== Contracting ===
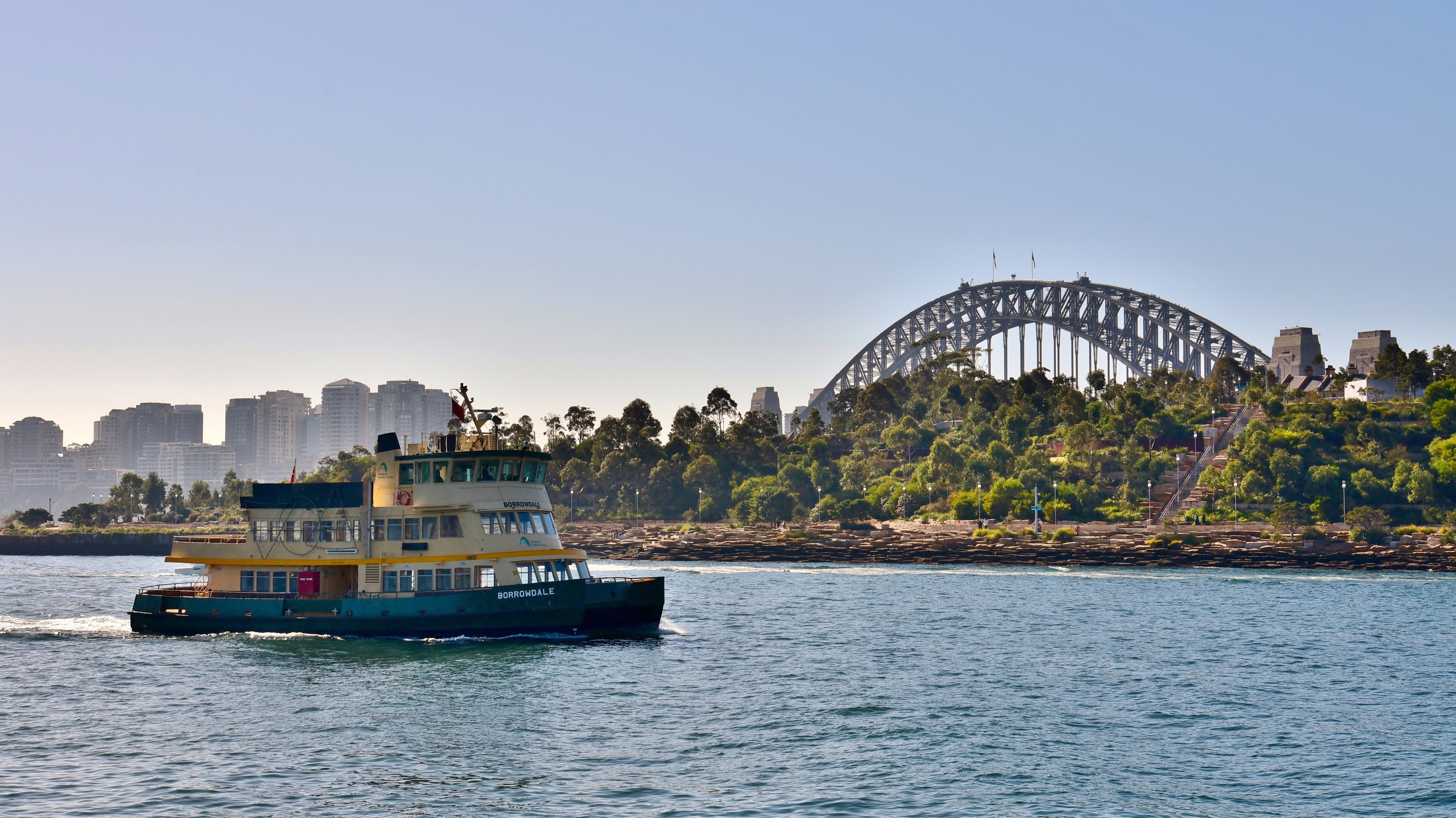
Borrowdale passing Barangaroo Reserve in 2018

In 2011, following a change in state government, it was decided to contract out the operation of Sydney Ferries to the private sector, with the government retaining ownership of both the Balmain Maintenance Facility and the ferry fleet, under the agency Sydney Ferries.

On 28 July 2012, Harbour City Ferries, a 50/50 joint venture between Transfield Services (later Broadspectrum) and Veolia Transdev (later Transdev Australasia), began operating the services of Sydney Ferries under a seven-year contract. In December 2016, Transdev Australasia exercised an option to purchase Broadspectrum's share.

In February 2019, Transdev was awarded a new nine-year contract by the Government commencing 28 July 2019. Under the contract, it will lease 10 new ferries (the River-class) to expand Parramatta River services and also some further Emerald class ferries for other services, which had resulted in an additional 280 weekly services. It is also planned to combine the F2 and F6 routes to be operated on a 20-minute frequency, however this change was only implemented during off-peak times. Harbour City Ferries was also rebranded Transdev Sydney Ferries.

== Operations ==
=== Network ===
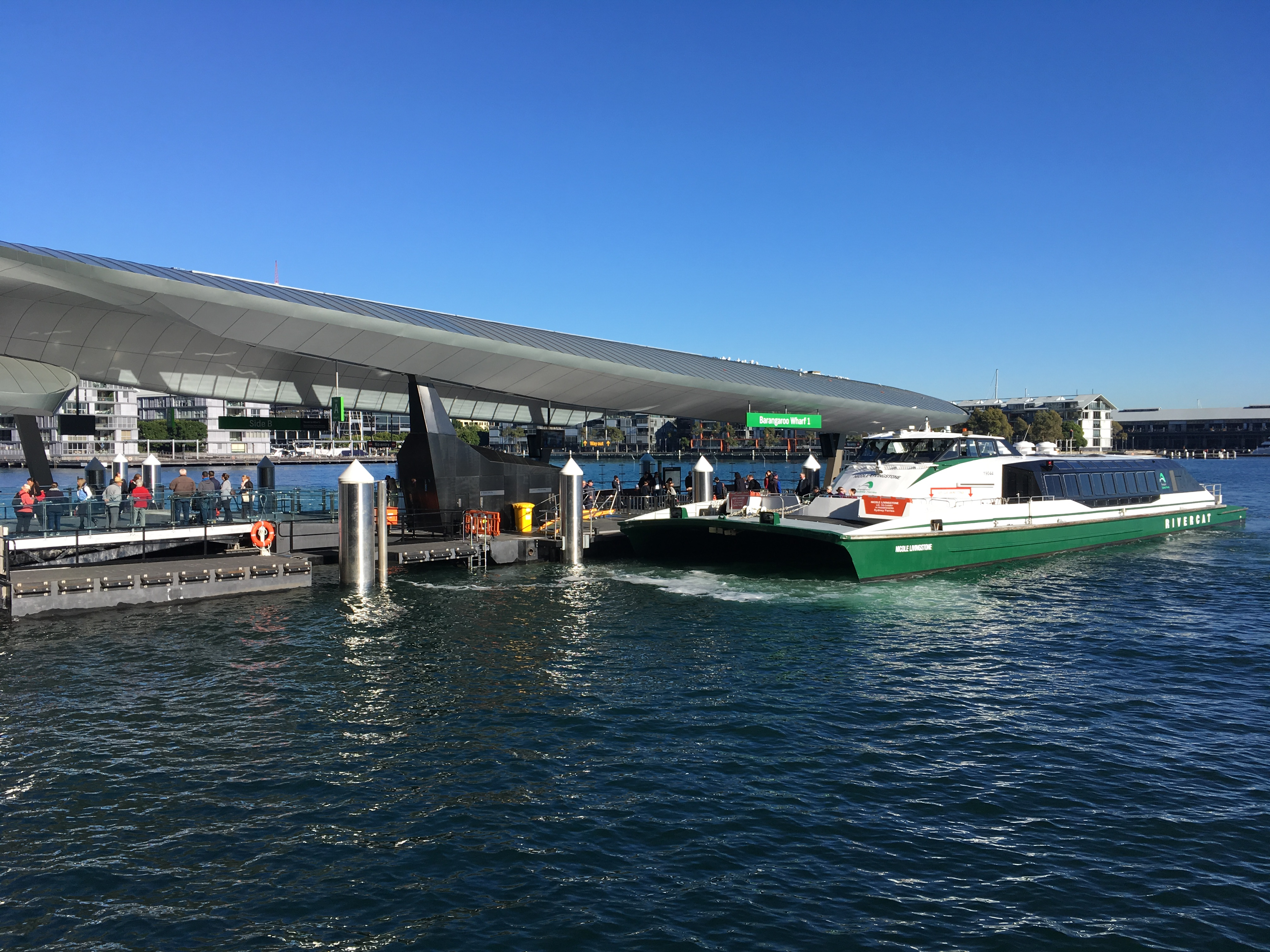
A RiverCat ferry docking at Barangaroo ferry wharf

Sydney Ferries operates on ten routes. All routes terminate at Circular Quay, with the exception of the F10 route which terminates at Barangaroo:

Route		Termini	Wharves	Full length
Manly ferry service	Manly	Circular Quay, Manly	2	11.3 km (7.0 mi)
Taronga Zoo ferry service	Taronga Zoo	Circular Quay, Taronga Zoo	2	3.3 km (2.1 mi)
Parramatta River ferry service	Parramatta River	Circular Quay, Parramatta	18	27 km (17 mi)
Pyrmont Bay ferry service	Pyrmont Bay	Circular Quay, Pyrmont Bay	6	4 km (2.5 mi)
Neutral Bay ferry service	Neutral Bay	Circular Quay, Neutral Bay	5	
Mosman Bay ferry service	Mosman Bay	Circular Quay, Mosman Bay	5	
Double Bay ferry service	Double Bay	Circular Quay, Double Bay	3	
Cockatoo Island ferry service	Cockatoo Island	Circular Quay, Cockatoo Island	6	
Watsons Bay ferry service	Watsons Bay	Circular Quay, Watsons Bay	3	
Blackwattle Bay ferry service	Blackwattle Bay	Barangaroo, Blackwattle Bay	3	

Sydney Ferries previously commenced an on-demand service connection to Blackwattle Bay in October 2019 until it was converted to the F10 timetabled service in 2021.

The hub of the network is at Circular Quay.

Interactive map of all wharves served by Sydney Ferries

=== Fleet ===
The Sydney Ferries fleet consists of 39 vessels divided into six classes:

Sydney Ferries fleet
Class	Image	Vessels	Commissioned	Capacity	Routes
Freshwater		3	1982–1988	1100	Manly
First Fleet		9	1984–1986	393/403	Inner Harbour, Taronga Zoo, Double Bay
Emerald		9	2016–2021	400	Eastern Suburbs, Inner Harbour, Manly
MiniCat		1	2019	43	Blackwattle Bay
River		10	2020–2021	200	Parramatta River, Inner Harbour
Parramatta River		7	2024–2025	200	Parramatta River

Construction of 7 new Parramatta River-class vessels was completed in 2025, allowing for the RiverCats to be gradually phased out. Notably, these ferries are built in Australia, unlike the River Class and Emerald Class second generation ferries. They feature a similar design to River class but lack the upper level seating on the roof, allowing for operation through to Parramatta without a need to close the upper seating at Rydalmere Wharf to safely clear lower bridges.

=== Patronage ===
The following table lists patronage figures for the network during the corresponding financial year. Australia's financial years start on 1 July and end on 30 June. Major events that affected the number of journeys made or how patronage is measured are included as notes.

Sydney Ferries patronage by financial year
Year	2010–11	2011–12	2012–13	2013–14	2014–15	2015–16	2016–17	2017–18	2018–19	2019–20	2020–21	2021–22	2022–23
Patronage (millions)	14.5	14.8	14.9	16.0 (Note: Opal rollout completed in August 2013) (Note: International Fleet Review held in October 2013)	14.8	15.4	14.9 (Note: Figures from 2016–17 onwards are based on Opal tap on and tap off data. Non-Opal tickets were discontinued in August 2016.)	15.3	14.9	11.1 (Note: Patronage was lower than previous years due to people staying at home and not taking public transport to school or work during the COVID-19 pandemic)	6.2	5.3	13.2
Reference													
View source data.

2025-26 Sydney Ferries annual patronage by line (Note: Figures based on Opal tap on and tap off data)
Manly ferry service	4,532,938	View source data.
Taronga Zoo ferry service	1,545,805	View source data.
Parramatta River ferry service	2,429,310	View source data.
Pyrmont Bay ferry service	2,779,319	View source data.
Neutral Bay ferry service	562,998	View source data.
Mosman Bay ferry service	709,762	View source data.
Double Bay ferry service	273,741	View source data.
Cockatoo Island ferry service	535,934	View source data.
Watsons Bay ferry service	1,873,854	View source data.
Blackwattle Bay ferry service	17,970	

2025 Transport for NSW patronage in Sydney by mode
Mode	Patronage	% of total
Metro	71,956,399	10.82
Train	284,972,638	42.84
Bus	242,983,455	36.53
Ferry	18,633,461	2.80
Light rail	46,640,237	7.01
Total	665,186,190	100.00

=== Fares ===
Sydney Ferries uses the Opal ticketing system. Opal is also valid on metro, train, bus and light rail services but separate fares apply for these modes. The following table lists Opal fares for reusable smartcards and single trip tickets:

Ferry
As of 14 July 2025	0–9 km	9 km+
Adult cards & contactless	$7.35	$9.20
Other cards	$3.67^	$4.60^
Adult single trip	$8.80	$11.00
Child/Youth single trip	$4.40	$5.50
Bus fares apply to Newcastle's Stockton Ferry

^ = $2.50 for Pensioner/Senior cardholders

=== Maintenance ===
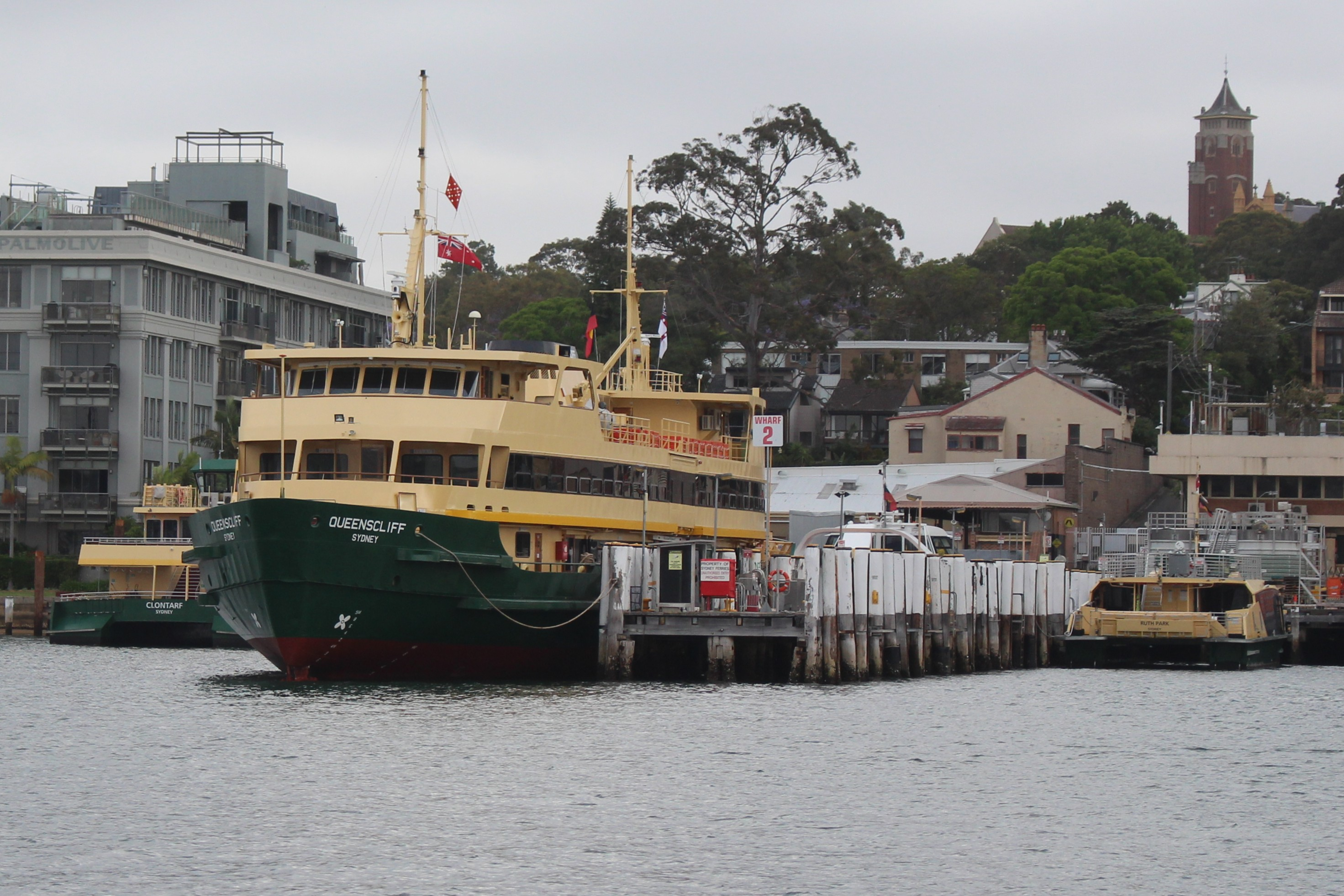
Clontarf, Queenscliff, Louise Sauvage and Ruth Park at Balmain Shipyard in 2023.

Balmain Shipyard in Mort Bay was established about 1890 by Balmain Ferry Company as a depot, ferry wharf and ferry coaling wharf but through amalgamations and government takeovers, has become the present Sydney Ferries' Maintenance Facility and Training base and is leased to Transdev Sydney Ferries.

== Incidents ==
On 12 May 2004, the Louise Sauvage crashed into a wharf at Rose Bay. A small number of minor injuries resulted from the accident, which was blamed on a steering mechanism fault.

In January 2007, one man died after the Sydney RiverCat, Dawn Fraser, collided with a dinghy.

In March 2007, a Sydney Ferries vessel crashed into a whale-watching ship before hitting Pyrmont Bridge in Darling Harbour.

=== Merinda–Pam Burridge collision ===
On Wednesday, 28 March 2007, the Sydney Ferries HarbourCat Pam Burridge collided with a private vessel, the Merinda beneath the Sydney Harbour Bridge. Four people, including a fourteen-year-old girl, were killed in the accident. The Office of Transport Safety Investigations found that the Merinda was not exhibiting the required navigation lights and had not maintained a proper look-out. The summary of the Coroner's Report noted "It was the error made in failing to illuminate the navigation lights [on the private vessel Merinda] that allowed the other causal factors to align to create a cascading causal effect resulting in the collision. Australian skating champion Sean Carlow was among the survivors of the accident. His mother and coach, former Australian Olympic competitor Elizabeth Cain, had a leg amputated. One of the dead was a skating judge who had officiated at the 2007 World Figure Skating Championships the previous week.

=== Other incidents ===
On 23 November 2008, at 5:15pm the Lady Northcott ran into the stern of Friendship while the former was berthing behind the latter at Circular Quay. No one was on board the Friendship, and no passengers were injured on the Lady Northcott.

On 6 April 2009 the Lady Northcott crashed into rocks after it overshot Taronga Zoo wharf. No one was injured in the accident, and it was blamed on driver error.

On 11 October 2010 at 8:47am the HarbourCat ferry Anne Sergeant ran into the Kirribilli Jeffrey Street wharf. One passenger was taken to hospital with some other passengers receiving minor injuries.

On 7 November 2010, at approximately 4:30pm, a speedboat crashed into the Fantasea Spirit (owned and operated by Palm Beach Ferries, operating for Sydney Ferries) 100m from Meadowbank wharf on the Parramatta River, injuring six people. The skipper of the speedboat, a 49-year-old Dundas man, was charged with culpably navigating in a dangerous manner causing grievous bodily harm (GBH) and operating a recreational vessel negligently causing death or GBH.
