= Emerald-class ferry =

Type of ferry used on Sydney Harbour

Emerald class
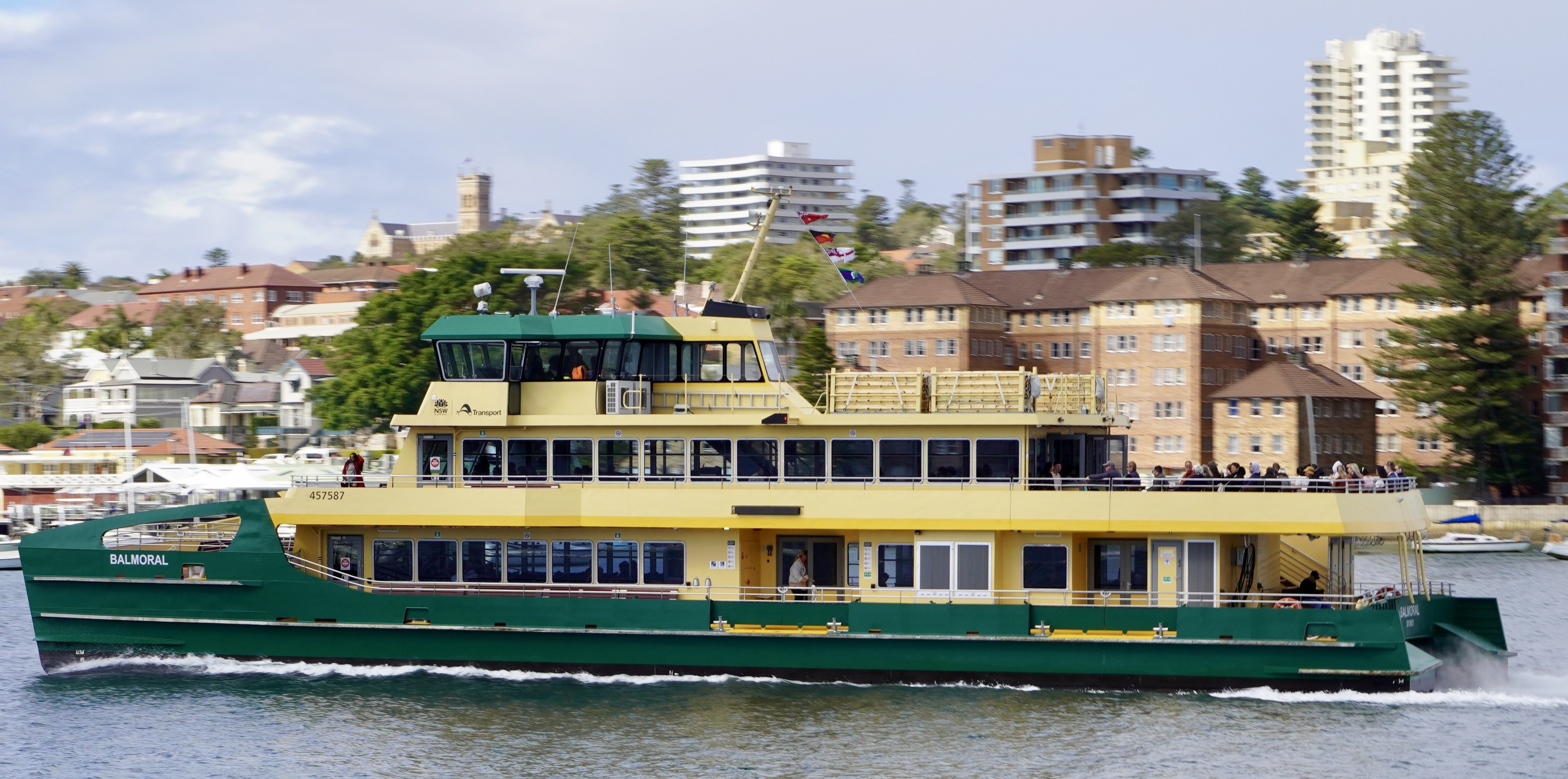
- Balmoral in Sydney harbour, August 2025

Class overview
- Builders: Incat (Generation 1), Jianglong Shipbuilding Co (Generation 2)
- Operators: Transdev Sydney Ferries
- Built: 2016–2021
- Completed: 9
- Active: 9

General characteristics
- Type: Catamaran
- Length: 35 m (114 ft 10 in)
- Beam: 10 m (32 ft 10 in)
- Decks: 2
- Installed power: 2 × Yanmar 6AYEM-GT
- Speed: 26 knots (48 km/h; 30 mph)
- Capacity: 400
- Crew: 3

The Emerald-class ferry is a class of ferries operated by Sydney Ferries on Sydney Harbour. There is capacity for about 400 passengers, improved accessibility for people with disabilities, Wi-Fi access, luggage and bicycle storage areas and charging stations/USB ports for electronic devices.

== History ==
=== Generation 1 (Inner Harbour) ===
In November 2014, the Government of New South Wales announced six new ferries would be ordered for use on Sydney Ferries services. In September 2015, the contract to build the ferries was awarded to Incat. The first ferry was expected to enter service in late 2016.

However, the entry into service was delayed due to problems uncovered during testing that required modifications to the vessel. Fred Hollows was the first ferry to enter service, commencing operations on 26 June 2017. The introduction of the Emerald-class ferries allowed the final two Lady-class ferries to be withdrawn in October 2017.

The sixth was delivered carrying the name Emerald 6. Transport for NSW subsequently announced it would be renamed Ferry McFerryface along the same lines as Boaty McBoatface. However the Maritime Union of Australia refused to crew the vessel in protest at the name. It entered service in December 2017 named Emerald 6 with a Ferry McFerryface sticker below the bridge. In January 2018, following revelations that the name was not a public vote winner but selected by Transport Minister Andrew Constance, it was renamed May Gibbs.

On 2 July 2020, Pemulwuy suffered a steering failure. The ferry suddenly began an uncommanded, sharp turn to starboard. The master immediately switched to back-up steering and took evasive action to avoid a collision with the ferry Narrabeen following closely behind. It was found that a steering toggle (joystick) had failed, and since calculations revealed the toggles had likely reached the end of their service life, the toggles on all ferries in the class were replaced with new toggles of the same type.

On 23 November 2020, Pemulwuy suffered another near identical loss of control. Following a more detailed investigation, it was found the current flowing through the toggles was 1.2 amps, much higher than the 0.5 amps they were rated for. This increased current was causing damage to the microswitch inside and shortening its lifespan. In consultation with Incat, relays were installed to lower the current flowing through the toggles on Pemulwuy. Following successful trials, all other ferries in the class were modified to this configuration.

=== Generation 2 (Manly) ===
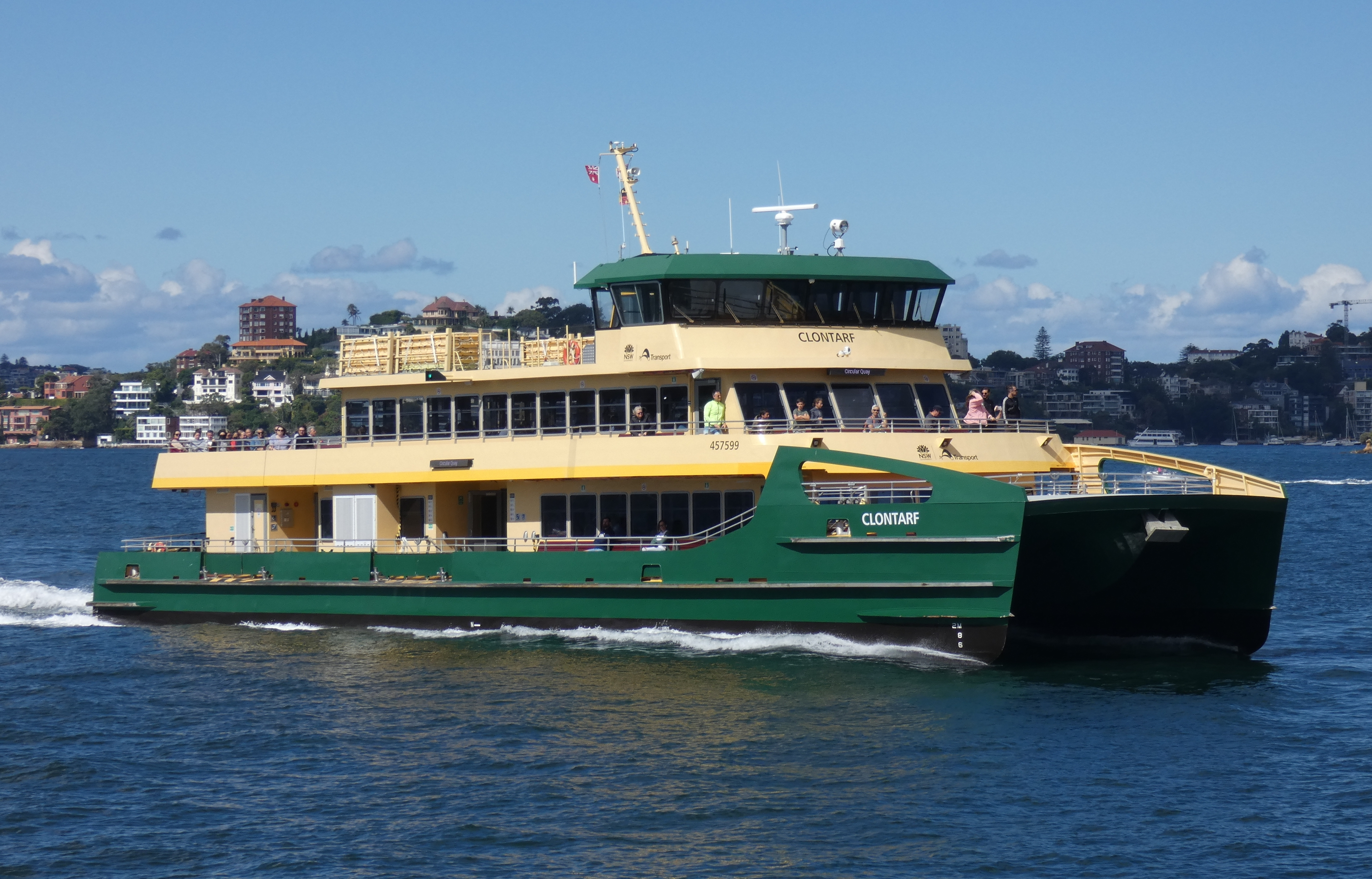
Clontarf, a Gen 2 Emerald-class ferry

In 2021 a second series of Emerald-class ferries (Generation 2), fitted with wave-piercing hulls, were built to replace the Freshwater-class ferries on the Manly ferry services. The new vessels were named after Sydney Harbour beaches Fairlight, Clontarf and Balmoral. In October 2021 the first of the new ferries Fairlight was put into service a few days after the Freshwater-class ferry MV Queenscliff was retired. The rest of the vessels entered service throughout the next month.

The new Emerald-class vessels were heavily criticized due to numerous problems and incidents that affected the vessels' performance. In November 2021 the ferry Balmoral was undertaking trials in high seas when a window was smashed and the rudder was damaged. This caused many to doubt the vessels' ability to cross Sydney Heads on days with big swells. Another problem identified with the vessels was that they were unable to load and unload passengers on the west side of Manly Wharf at low tide. This meant that the vessels were required to use the east side of the wharf, which is typically used by the Manly Fast Ferry, during low tide causing delays for both services. In December 2021 Transport minister Rob Stokes announced that the Freshwater-class ferry MV Narrabeen would have its engine rebuilt and would be returned to service due to the ongoing problems with the new Emerald-class vessels. On 12 March 2022 it was announced that the vessels had been cleared to operate in swells of up to 4.5 metres (15 ft).

The class have experienced a number of steering faults and failures. They were removed from service on 26 September 2022 after two separate ferries suffered identical failures in two days. One of these was a near miss with the cruise ship Coral Princess. Since 1 December 2021, the Office of Transport Safety Investigations (OTSI) had already received reports of 10 other steering defects with no known cause. It is unknown when the ferries returned to service. In May 2025, the ferries were once again pulled from service after another steering failure, with the operator Transdev stating the ferries required "a component change-out after a relay component issue was identified in the steering system on the Clontarf". As of late May 2025, a cause for these issues has not been announced, and the OTSI investigation remains ongoing.

== Design ==
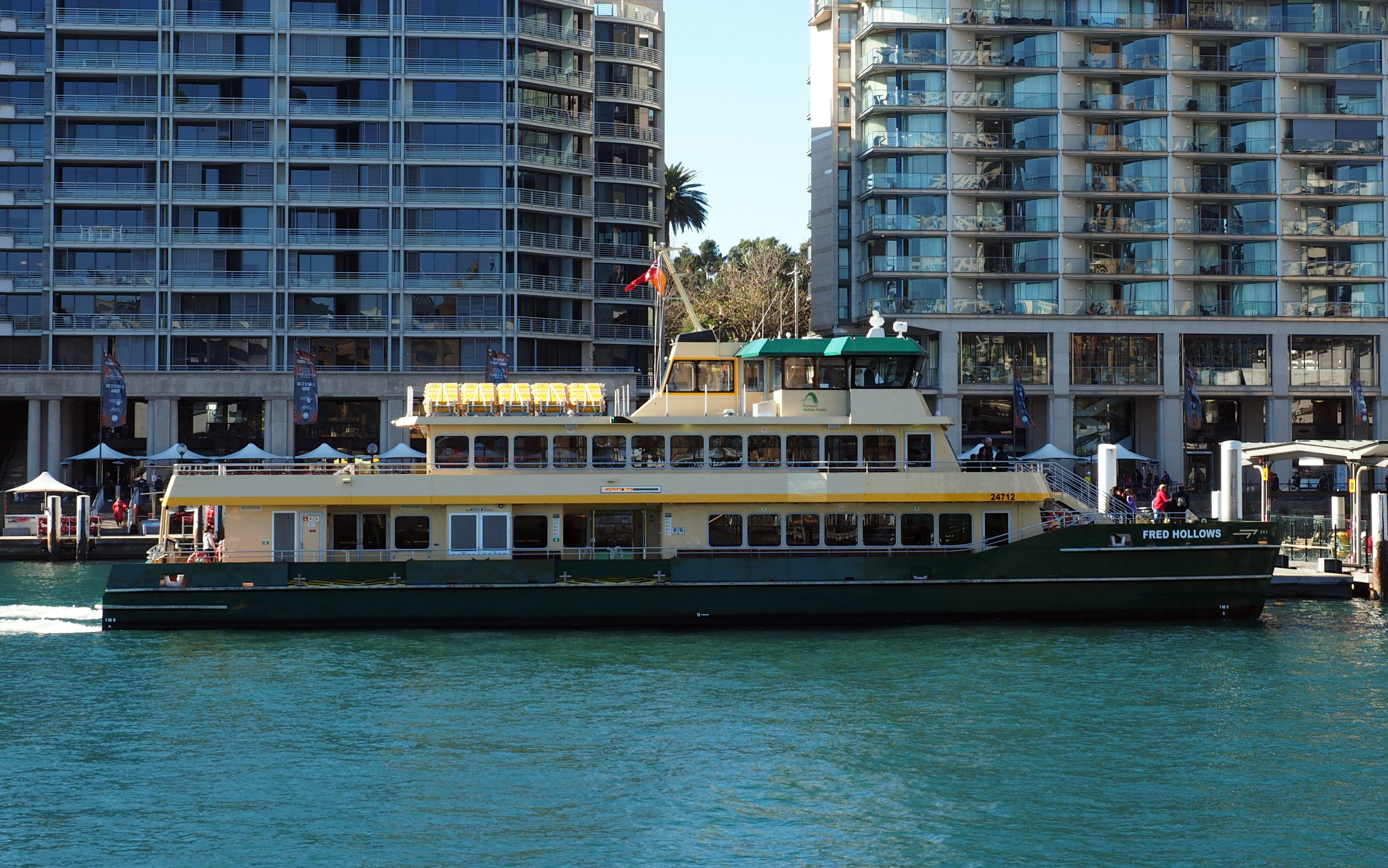
Fred Hollows in July 2017

The Emerald class operate on Cross Harbour ferry services and are designed to look similar to the First Fleet-class vessels. The ferries seat 375 passengers. The Generation 2 Emerald class were designed with wave piercing hulls to allow them to cross the Sydney Heads on days with high swells. The most noticeable difference between the Generation 1 and Generation 2 Emerald-class ferries is two large handle-like structures on the bows of the Generation 2 ferries.

== Vessels ==
Name	Call sign	MMSI	Shipyard no	Completed	Namesake	Picture	Reference
Catherine Hamlin	24622	503046120	Incat 082	2016	Catherine Hamlin	Catherine Hamlin	
Fred Hollows	24712	503053140	Incat 083	2017	Fred Hollows	Fred Hollows	
Victor Chang	24713	503055050	Incat 084	2017	Victor Chang	Victor Chang	
Pemulwuy	24714	503057290	Incat 085	2017	Pemulwuy	Pemulwuy	
Bungaree	24715	503058420	Incat 086	2017	Bungaree	Bungaree	
May Gibbs	24716	503059930	Incat 087	2017	May Gibbs	May Gibbs	
Fairlight	457554	503106820		2021	Fairlight	Fairlight	
Balmoral	457587	503106790		2021	Balmoral	Balmoral	
Clontarf	457599	503106810		2021	Clontarf	Clontarf	
