= List of Sydney Ferries wharves =

External image
- Sydney Ferries network map (PDF) by Transport for NSW, updated November 2017.

Sydney Ferries is a metropolitan ferry service operating in Sydney Harbour, connecting a network of 38 wharves on the waterway and its various inlets and tributaries. Currently, Sydney Ferries operates ten distinct service routes across the harbour, with nine originating from, or terminating at, Circular Quay ferry wharf. Circular Quay is one of only five wharves on the network to be regularly serviced by more than one route, with the other four being Balmain East, Barangaroo, McMahons Point, and Milsons Point. All are serviced by both the F3 Parramatta River and F4 Pyrmont Bay services. The network's extent reaches Parramatta ferry wharf at its most westerly, and Manly ferry wharf at its most easterly.

== Wharves ==
=== In use ===
Interactive map: Interactive map of all wharves served by Sydney Ferries
Name	Image	Coordinates	Bs	Route(s)	Date opened	Previous names (Note: Ferry wharf names as they appeared in Sydney Ferries maps from 1992, 1995, 2002, 2006, July 2008, December 2008, 2010, and 2011.)	Interchanges
Abbotsford	Abbotsford	33°50′37.3″S 151°07′41.5″E	1	Parramatta River ferry service	1834 (for Bedlams Ferry) 2018 (renovation)		
Balmain	Balmain	33°51′16.4″S 151°11′10.6″E	1	Parramatta River ferry service Cockatoo Island ferry service	circa 1895 (original); 1997 (repairs) (Note: A $50,000 effort by the Department of Transport to restore the structure of the wharf, mostly damaged after a century of use.); 2013 (renovation)	Thames Street, Balmain (–2002)	
Balmain East	Balmain East	33°51′24.6″S 151°11′46.2″E	1	Parramatta River ferry service Pyrmont Bay ferry service	1844 (original); 18 June 2015 (renovation)	Darling Street, Balmain (–2002)	
Balmain West		33°51′18.0″S 151°10′07″W	1	Parramatta River ferry service	Unknown; Reopened 18 August 2025	Elliot Street, Balmain (–2002)	
Barangaroo; Wharf 1	Barangaroo wharf 1	33°51′51.6″S 151°12′03.3″E	2	Parramatta River ferry service Pyrmont Bay ferry service Blackwattle Bay ferry service	26 June 2017		Railways in Sydney
Barangaroo; Wharf 2	Barangaroo wharf 2	33°51′52.9″S 151°12′03.5″E	2	Parramatta River ferry service Pyrmont Bay ferry service Blackwattle Bay ferry service	26 June 2017		Railways in Sydney
Birchgrove	Birchgrove	33°50′47.3″S 151°11′10.7″E	1	Cockatoo Island ferry service	unknown	Longnose Point, Birchgrove (–1995); Yurulbin Point (1995–2002)	
Blackwattle Bay	Blackwattle Bay Pontoon	33°52′16.9″S 151°11′6.6″E	1	Blackwattle Bay ferry service	November 2021		
Cabarita	Cabarita	33°50′27.4″S 151°06′59.3″E	1	Parramatta River ferry service	circa 2000		
Chiswick	Chiswick	33°50′44.1″S 151°08′30.4″E	1	Parramatta River ferry service	circa 2000 (original); 31 July 2017 (renovation)		
Circular Quay; Wharf 2	Circular Quay Wharf 2	33°51′38.7″S 151°12′43.4″E	2	Mosman Bay ferry service Double Bay ferry service Watsons Bay ferry service	1901 (original); 1956 (first renovation); 2002 (second renovation)	Circular Quay Ferry Terminal (–2013)	Railways in Sydney
Circular Quay; Wharf 3	Circular Quay Wharf 3	33°51′38.4″S 151°12′41.4″E	2	Manly ferry service	1901 (original); 1956 (first renovation); 1986 (second renovation) (Note: A two-storey upgrade to Wharf 3, which allowed berthing of the larger Freshwater class ferries.); 2002 (third renovation)	Circular Quay Ferry Terminal (–2013)	Railways in Sydney
Circular Quay; Wharf 4	Circular Quay Wharf 4	33°51′38.3″S 151°12′39.6″E	2	Taronga Zoo ferry service Parramatta River ferry service Pyrmont Bay ferry service Neutral Bay ferry service Mosman Bay ferry service	1901 (original); 1956 (first renovation); 2002 (second renovation)	Circular Quay Ferry Terminal (–2013)	Railways in Sydney
Circular Quay; Wharf 5	Circular Quay Wharf 5	33°51′38.1″S 151°12′37.8″E	2	Parramatta River ferry service Pyrmont Bay ferry service	1901 (original); 1956 (first renovation); 2002 (second renovation)	Circular Quay Ferry Terminal (–2013)	Railways in Sydney
Cockatoo Island	Cockatoo Island	33°50′44.0″S 151°10′23.7″E	2	Parramatta River ferry service Cockatoo Island ferry service	March 1908 (original); circa 1950s (first renovation); 2001 (second renovation); 2004 (reconstruction) (Note: Reconstruction of the wharf's gangway and pontoon after a collision with a vessel due to a faulty starboard engine.); 18 August 2017 (third renovation)	Cockatoo Dockyard (–2001)	
Cremorne Point	Cremorne Point	33°50′52.7″S 151°13′51.7″E	1	Mosman Bay ferry service	circa 1910s (original); 15 September 2007 (reconstruction) (Note: Reconstruction after the original wharf was a casualty of the June 2007 extratropical cyclone that hit New South Wales.); 5 February 2015 (renovation)		
Darling Point	Darling Point	33°51′59.4″S 151°14′22.3″E	1	Double Bay ferry service	unknown		
Double Bay	Double Bay	33°52′23.3″S 151°14′33.2″E	1	Double Bay ferry service	December 2023 (renovation)		
Drummoyne	Drummoyne	33°50′43.6″S 151°09′25.8″E	1	Parramatta River ferry service	circa 1880s (original); 1915 (first renovation); 17 September 2014 (second renovation)	Wolseley Street, Drummoyne (–2002)	
Greenwich Point	Greenwich Point	33°50′31.4″S 151°10′50.8″E	1	Cockatoo Island ferry service	circa 1980s	Greenwich (–2008, 2010–13)	
Huntleys Point	Huntleys Point	33°50′31.8″S 151°08′31.0″E	1	Parramatta River ferry service	1928 (original); 23 April 2013 (renovation)	Gladesville (–2002)	
Kirribilli	Kirribilli	33°50′57.8″S 151°13′13.7″E	1	Neutral Bay ferry service	unknown	North Sydney, Kirribilli (–2002)	
Kissing Point	Kissing Point	33°49′54.1″S 151°06′07.0″E	1	Parramatta River ferry service	circa 2000s		
Kurraba Point	Kurraba Point	33°50′36.3″S 151°13′18.4″E	1	Neutral Bay ferry service	unknown	Kurraba Point, Neutral Bay (–2002)	
Manly	Manly	33°48′01.4″S 151°17′02.1″E	2	Manly ferry service	1855 (original); 1945 (reconstruction) (Note: Entirely rebuilt after a fire in 1939 destroyed the entire wharf structure.)		
McMahons Point	McMahons Point	33°50′55.3″S 151°12′23.2″E	1	Parramatta River ferry service Pyrmont Bay ferry service	1860–71 (original); 20 October 2016 (renovation)	McMahons Point & Luna Park (1995–2002)	
Meadowbank	Meadowbank	33°49′16.13″S 151°5′23.52″E	1	Parramatta River ferry service	unknown		
Milsons Point; Wharf 1	Milsons Point	33°50′57.6″S 151°12′37.8″E	1	Parramatta River ferry service Pyrmont Bay ferry service	before 1895 (original); 29 November 2010 (first renovation); 2017 (second renovation)	Milsons Point/Luna Park (2008–13)	
Milsons Point; Wharf 2		33°50′59.6″S 151°12′39.8″E	1	Parramatta River ferry service Pyrmont Bay ferry service	2017	Milsons Point/Luna Park (2008–13)	
Mosman Bay	Mosman Bay	33°50′18.5″S 151°13′56.2″E	1	Mosman Bay ferry service	1871 (original); 8 October 2014 (renovation)	Mosman (–2002)	
Neutral Bay	Neutral Bay	33°50′32.4″S 151°13′09.8″E	1	Neutral Bay ferry service	1871 (original); 20 August 2012 (renovation)	Hayes Street, Neutral Bay (–2002)	
North Sydney	North Sydney	33°50′41.5″S 151°13′07.4″E	1	Neutral Bay ferry service	unknown	North Sydney, High Street (–2002)	
Old Cremorne		33°50′27.1″S 151°13′49.8″E	1	Mosman Bay ferry service	unknown		
Parramatta	Parramatta	33°48′50.09″S 151°0′38.09″E	1	Parramatta River ferry service	9 December 1993		
Pirrama Park		33°51′52.58″S 151°11′27.73″E	1	Blackwattle Bay ferry service	7 April 2025		Light rail in Sydney
Pyrmont Bay	Pyrmont Bay	33°52′05.4″S 151°11′55.7″E	1	Pyrmont Bay ferry service	circa 1980s (original); 8 September 2015 (renovation)		Light rail in Sydney
Rose Bay	Rose Bay	33°52′14.2″S 151°15′43.8″E	1	Watsons Bay ferry service	circa 1940s (original); 1989 (reconstruction) (Note: Reconstruction and partial renovation of the wharf after severe damage caused by a collision with the MV Borrowdale on 6 September 1987.); 26 September 2012 (renovation)		
Rydalmere	Rydalmere	33°49′4.76″S 151°2′37.46″E	1	Parramatta River ferry service	9 December 1993		
South Mosman		33°50′35.7″S 151°13′57.4″E	1	Mosman Bay ferry service	before 1882	Musgrave Street, Mosman (–2002)	
Sydney Olympic Park	Sydney Olympic Park	33°49′20.75″S 151°4′43.66″E	2	Parramatta River ferry service	22 September 1997 (original); 20 May 2015 (renovation)		
Taronga Zoo	Taronga Zoo	33°50′46.9″S 151°14′22.2″E	2	Taronga Zoo ferry service	circa 1870s	Taronga Zoo Athol Wharf (–1995)	
Watsons Bay	Watsons Bay	33°50′36.3″S 151°16′51.8″E	2	Watsons Bay ferry service	unknown		
Woolwich	Woolwich	33°50′19.4″S 151°10′33.7″E	1	Cockatoo Island ferry service	1856 (original) 2020 Renovation	Hunters Hill (Woolwich), Valentia Street (–2002)	

=== Decommissioned ===
Name	Image	Coordinates	Bs	Route(s)	Date opened	Decommissioned	Previous names
Aquarium	Aquarium	33°52′10.9″S 151°12′04.2″E	1	Darling Harbour	circa 1980s	10 October 2010	Aquarium (–1995); Darling Harbour (1995–2008)
Bayview Park	Bayview Park	33°51′23.6″S 151°07′19.4″E	1	Parramatta River	circa 1980	20 October 2013	
Birkenhead	Birkenhead	33°51′27.7″S 151°09′40.6″E	1	Balmain/Woolwich	unknown	10 October 2010	Birkenhead Point (1995–2002)
Darling Harbour	Darling Harbour	33°52′00.7″S 151°12′03.0″E	2	Darling Harbour; Parramatta River	circa 2000s	26 June 2017	King Street Wharf 3 (2008–10); Darling Harbour Terminal (2010–13)
Garden Island	Garden Island	33°51′29.3″S 151°13′47.8″E	1	Double Bay	unknown	2014	

=== Private Ferry Wharves ===
Wharves serving ferries operated by private operators

-Bennets Wharf

-Bonnie Doon

-Bundeena

-Cronulla

-Church Point

-Currawong Beach

-Longueville Wharf

-Lovette

-Riverview College

-Mackerel Beach

-Morning Bay, Halls Wharf

-Newport

-Northwood

-Palm Beach

-Scotland Island, Bells Wharf

-Scotland Island, Carols Wharf

-Scotland Island, Eastern Wharf

-Scotland Island, Tennis Wharf

-Shark Island

-South Elvina

-The Basin
