= Bayview Park ferry wharf =

Commuter wharf in Sydney, Australia

Bayview Park
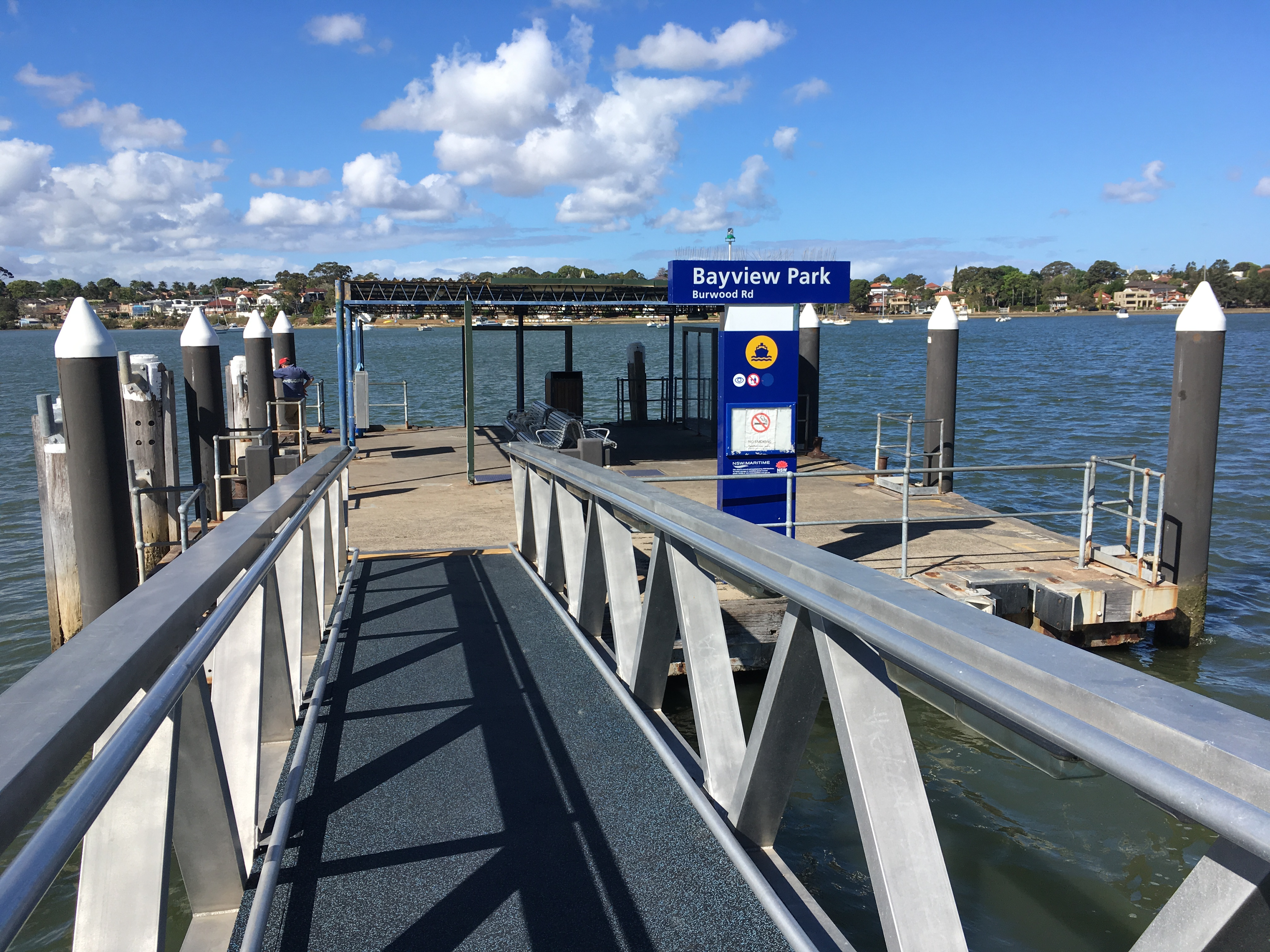
- View of the wharf pontoon in October 2017

General information
- Location: Burwood Road, Concord; New South Wales; Australia
- Coordinates: 33°51′23.6″S 151°07′19.4″E
- Owner: Transport for NSW
- Platforms: 1 wharf (1 berth)
- Connections: Buses

History
- Opened: c. 1980

Passengers
- 2013: 28 per week
Location
- Location of Bayview Park ferry wharf

Bayview Park ferry wharf is a commuter wharf located in the Sydney suburb of Concord, New South Wales, on Hen & Chicken Bay. It is situated adjacent the namesake Bayview Park reserve, and upon the site of the historical Burwood ferry wharf, where Canadian exiles from the 19th century Lower Canada Rebellion landed in Sydney. Bayview Park was originally serviced by a Matilda Cruises route, before being included on Sydney Ferries' Parramatta River service in 2006, after a brief one-year service by Palm Beach Ferries. Services to the wharf were decommissioned by Sydney Ferries in October 2013, alongside Balmain West after patronage declined to a weekly average of 28 passengers. No operators currently service the wharf, although the structure still remains, with plans to return private ferry services to the wharf as part of a redevelopment project for a factory in eastern Concord.

== History ==
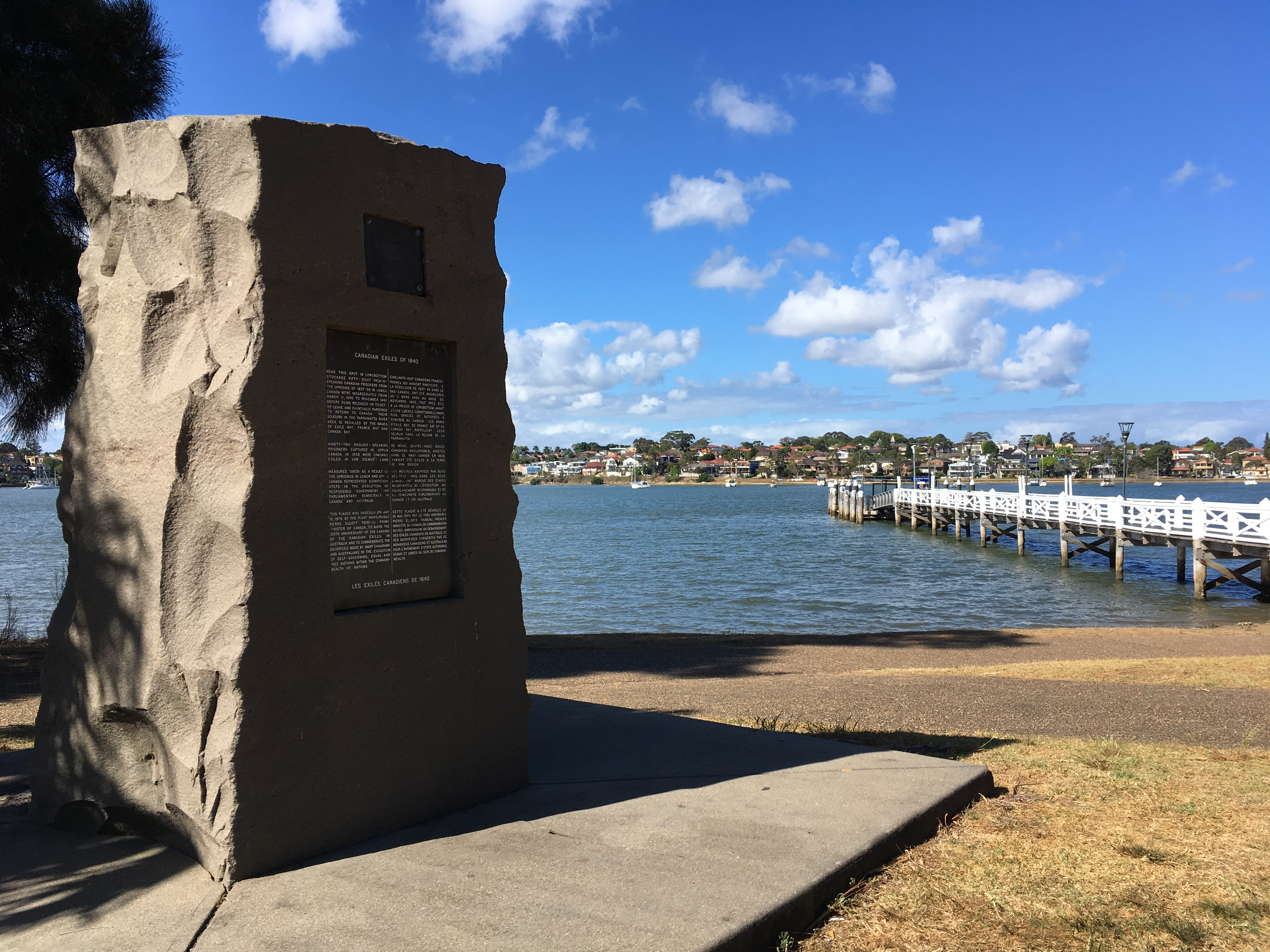
Stone monument on a bayside, with a jetty in the background

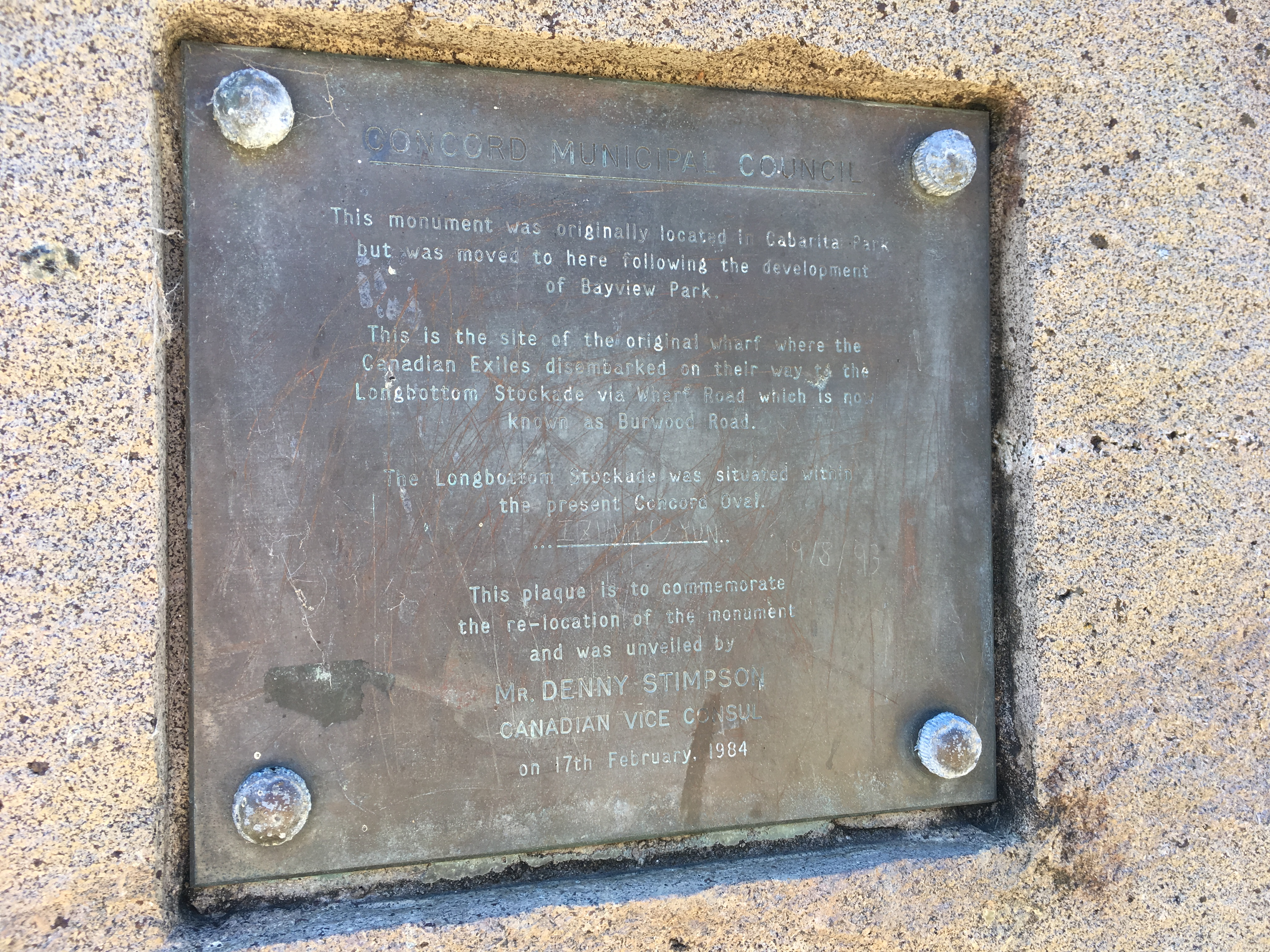
Close-up of a plaque on a stone monument

Bayview Park ferry wharf, and the namesake public park located adjacent to it, is built upon the site of the historical Burwood ferry wharf, which provided vital transport links from the region to Parramatta and the Sydney central business district in the early 19th century. Burwood wharf is most significant for being the landing site of HMS Buffalo on 26 February 1840, which carried 58 patriote exiles who fought against British colonialists in the Lower Canada Rebellion. The prisoners, who were incarcerated at Longbottom Stockade, formerly located at the present site of Concord Oval, were pardoned four years later, and policies pertaining to responsible government for which the Rebellions of 1837–1838 were fought, were eventually adopted in both Canada and Australia in the decades after the rebellions. A memorial stone to commemorate the 130th anniversary of the landing of HMS Buffalo was originally erected at Cabarita Park in May 1970 by Concord Council, and dedicated by Prime Minister of Canada Pierre Trudeau. The memorial stone was moved to its current location adjacent to the wharf entrance following the development of the Bayview Park reserve in February 1984. A similar memorial stone for the exiles of the Upper Canada Rebellion, who were also carried to Australia aboard MS Buffalo, was erected in Hobart, Tasmania. The geographic features of France Bay, Exile Bay, and Canada Bay, were named in honor of the convicts and their landing at the present-day Bayview Park.

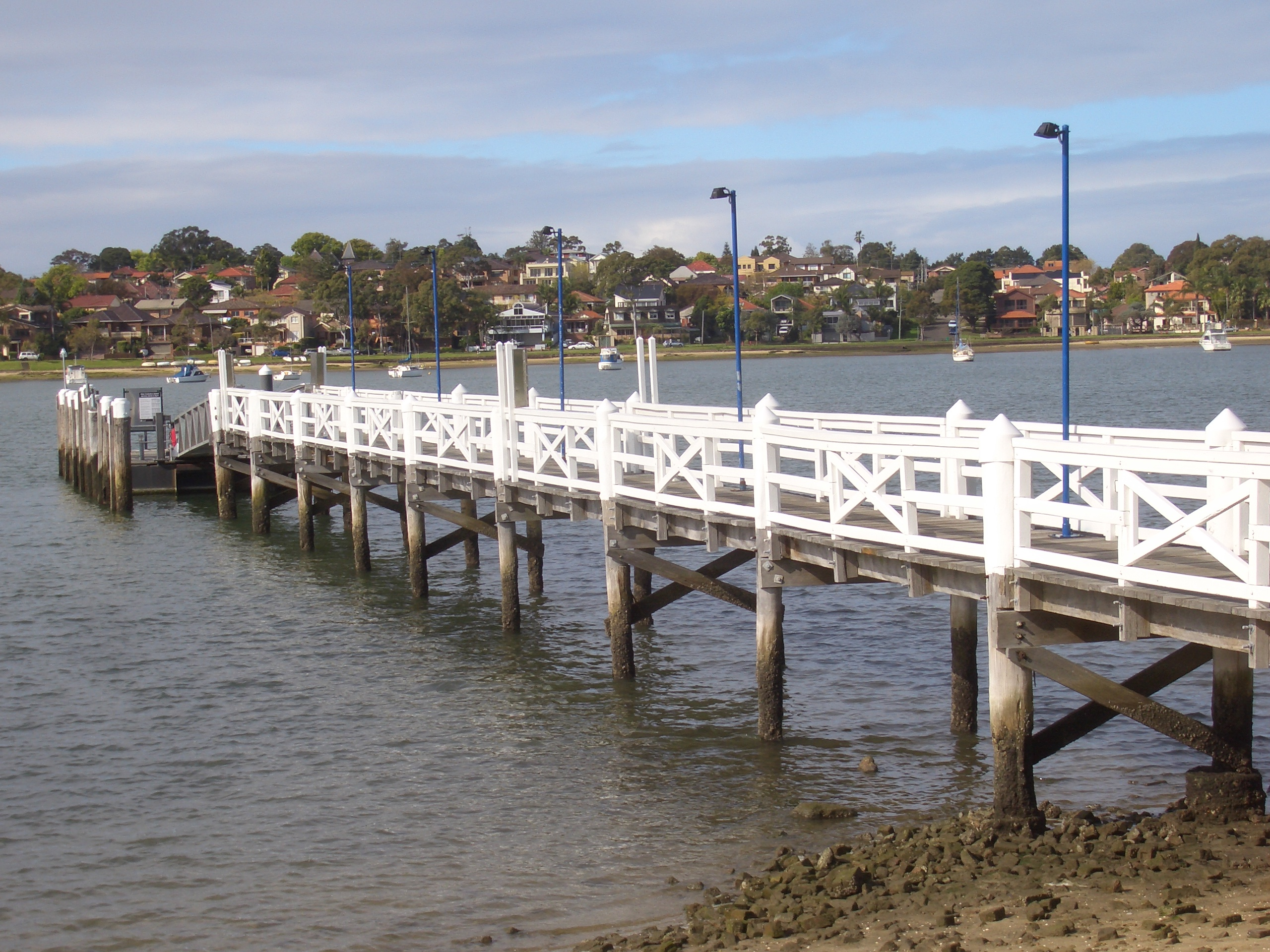
View of the wharf, with its original smaller pontoon, in September 2007

The Bayview Park reserve, along with the wharf, was opened in 1980. Ferry services to the wharf were mostly run by private ventures, with Matilda Cruises operating its Darling Harbour–Homebush Bay service to the wharf until October 2005. Palm Beach Ferries replaced Matilda Cruises services to the wharf afterwards with their new Darling Harbour–Cape Cabarita and Bayview Park service, though decommissioned the service altogether a year later, after it "failed to attract sufficient patronage to be economically viable." In September 2006, after requests from the constituents of Drummoyne, and its member Angela D'Amore in State Parliament, Sydney Ferries began servicing Bayview Park as part of its Parramatta River route, serving as a terminus on its own dedicated limited-stops and shuttle pattern on the route. Sydney Ferries serviced the wharf for seven years. In October 2013, despite a redevelopment of the wharf enlarging the size of the pontoon to house shelter and seating, Bayview Park was decommissioned from the Sydney Ferries network, alongside Balmain West, both due to low patronage. In the last year of the service, Sydney Ferries saw a weekly average patronage of 28 passengers, compared to 870 weekly passengers at Cabarita, the closest ferry wharf to Bayview Park. The wharf's closure was not without controversy, sparking a political row between the Minister for Transport Gladys Berejiklian and the Minister for Drummoyne John Sidoti.

== Services ==
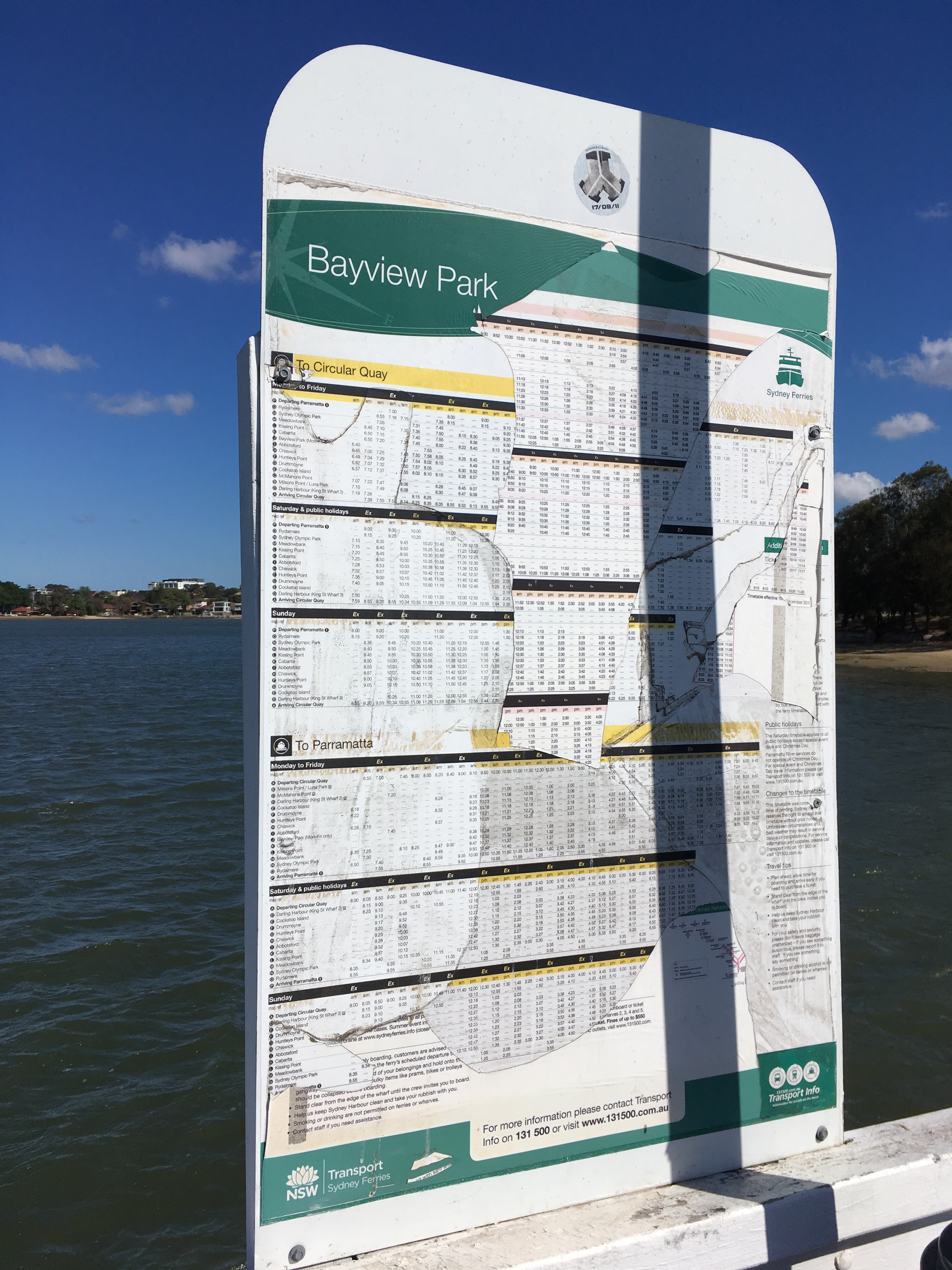
The timetable board at the wharf, as seen in October 2017. Visible are two layers of Sydney Ferries timetables

Until October 2005, Matilda Cruises' Darling Harbour–Homebush Bay route featured a stop at Bayview Park, along with Cape Cabarita, Cabarita, Meadowbank, and Sydney Olympic Park. Services to the wharf operated during hours of peak patronage during weekdays, and limited services ran on weekends. Palm Beach Ferries' three-stop service terminated at Bayview Park, and included a stop at Cape Cabarita before terminating at Darling Harbour Pier 26. As of their September 2006 timetable, Sydney Ferries started running weekday-only services that terminated at Bayview Park and King Street Wharf 3 as part of its Parramatta River route. In the Sydney to Parramatta direction, one morning shuttle and two afternoon services intermittently stopping at Drummoyne, Huntleys Point, Chiswick and Abbotsford. In the opposite direction, two morning services, with one making additional stops at McMahons Point and Milsons Point, and two shuttle services in the afternoon were run. By Sydney Ferries' October 2011 timetable, the terminus of the service on the Sydney end was moved up to Circular Quay, and morning services in the Parramatta to Sydney direction omitted stops at McMahons Point and Milsons Point. Transit Systems operates two bus services, 466 and 502 to and from the wharf.

== Future ==
A proposal to return ferry services to the wharf with the cooperation of a private ferry operator, as part of the redevelopment of the corporate campus of coffee manufacturer FreshFood Services on Burwood Road, was made as part of a March 2017 submission to the Greater Sydney Commission's Central District Plan on behalf of Business management consultant Urbis. The proposal seeks to commission a service between Bayview Park and Barangaroo after the first stage of residential development on Burwood Road, with its first three years being underwritten by FreshFood Services.
