= Sydney RiverCat =

Model of ferry used on the Parramatta River

RiverCat
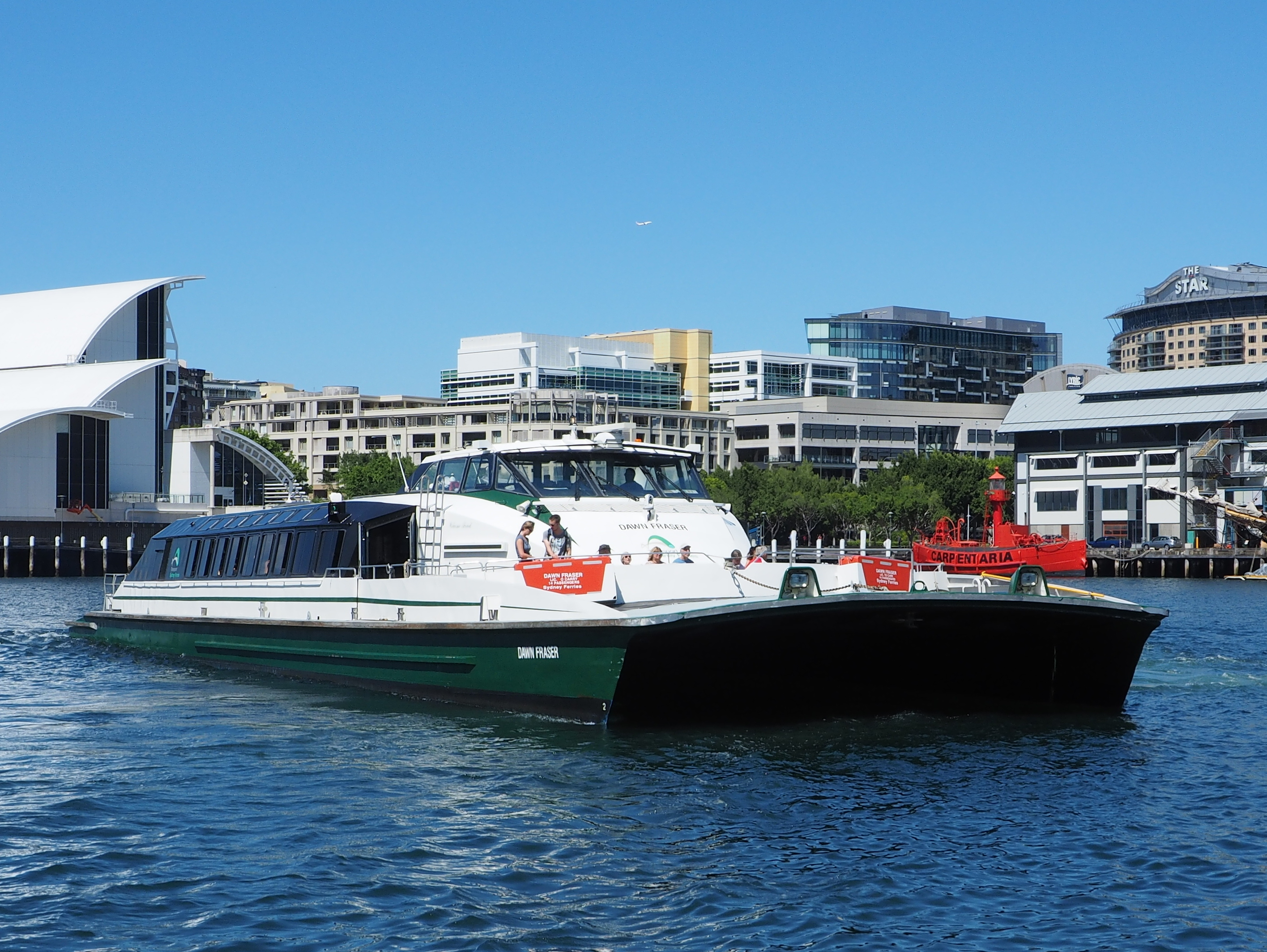
- Dawn Fraser in Darling Harbour in December 2014

Class overview
- Builders: NQEA; Wavemaster International
- Operators: State Transit Authority; Sydney Ferries; Transdev Sydney Ferries
- In service: 1992-2026
- Completed: 7
- Scrapped: All

General characteristics
- Type: Catamaran
- Length: 37.0 metres
- Beam: 10.5 metres
- Draught: 1.4 metres
- Decks: 1
- Installed power: 2 x GM 8V92TA
- Propulsion: 2 Shotell rudder/propeller drive
- Speed: 22 knots
- Capacity: 230
- Crew: 3

The RiverCat was a class of catamarans built for the State Transit Authority for use on the Parramatta River.

== History ==
In 1991 the State Transit Authority ordered six Grahame Parker Design designed RiverCats from NQEA, Cairns to operate Parramatta River services.

Named after famous Australian female athletes, the first was delivered in early 1992. They replaced First Fleet class ferries on the Circular Quay to Meadowbank service on 7 May 1992. In December 1993 they began operating to Parramatta.

In October 1995, a seventh vessel built by Wavemaster International in Henderson, Western Australia was delivered, named Nicole Livingstone. In 2000, Marlene Mathews participated in the 2000 Summer Olympics torch relay.

Although primarily operating Parramatta River services, they also occasionally operated other Transdev Sydney Ferries services.

The last vessel of the class was withdrawn on the 9 March 2026, with all 7 vessels having been scrapped by May 2026.

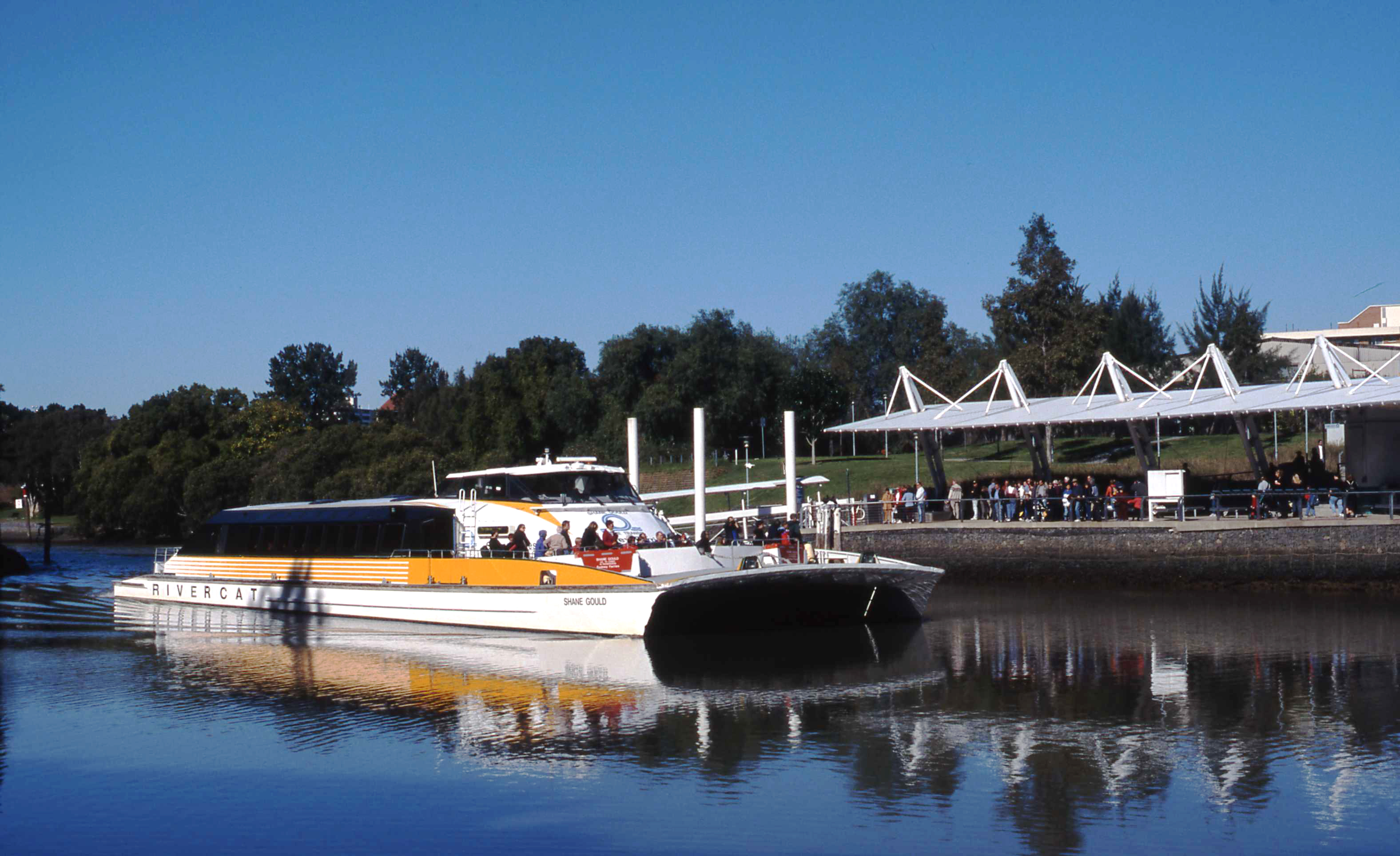
Shane Gould in original livery, June 2001

== Retirement ==
The introduction of the Parramatta River-class ferries allowed for the RiverCats to be phased out.

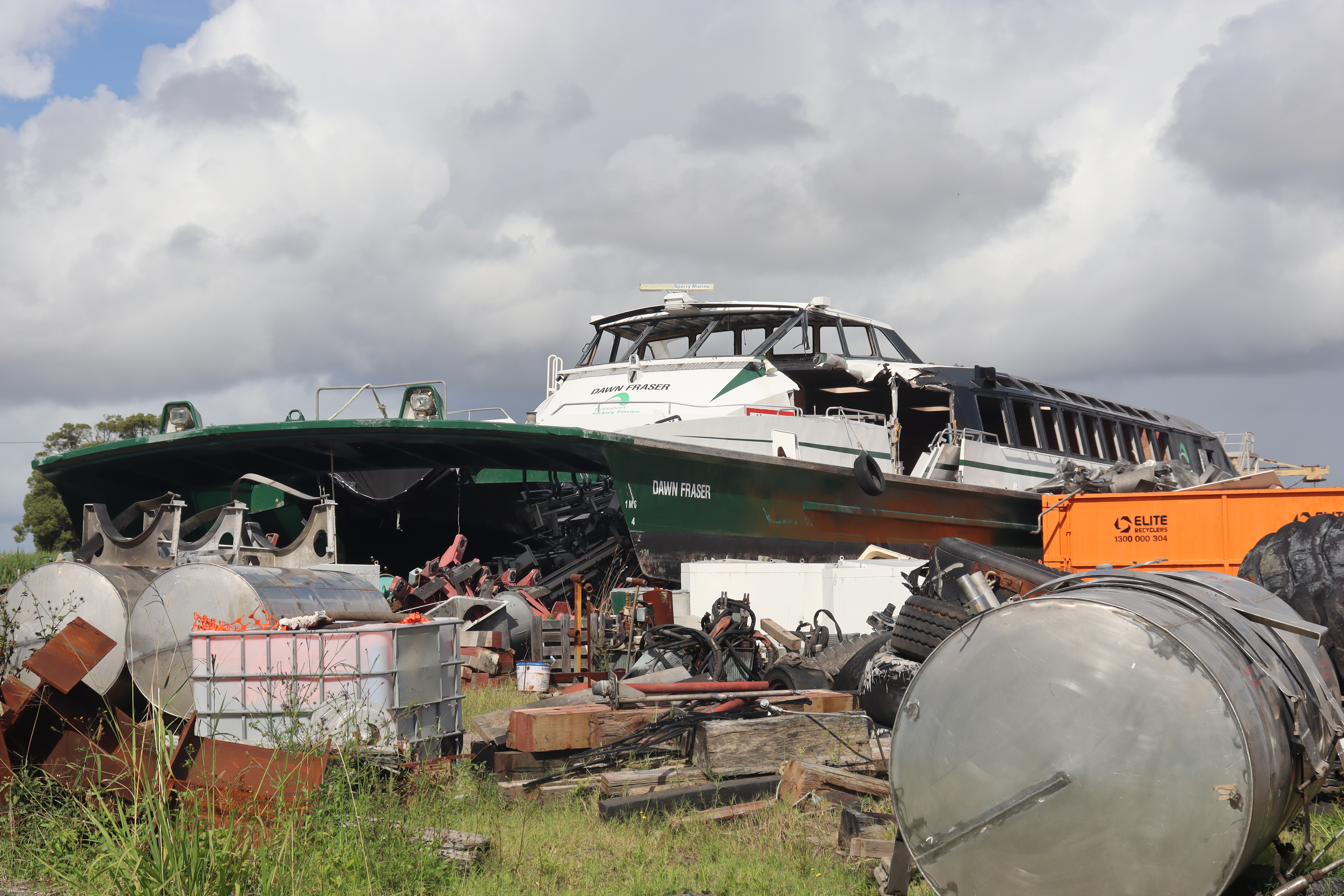
RiverCat Dawn Fraser undergoing scrapping in May 2026

On 16 February 2023, Betty Cuthbert was the first vessel retired from service. She was stripped for parts at Balmain Shipyard before being towed to Blackwattle Bay Marina for long-term storage, along with several decommissioned SuperCat-class ferries.

On 7 June 2024 Evonne Goolagong was withdrawn. She was used as a parts source at Balmain, before briefly being relocated to Rozelle Bay, along with sister Betty Cuthbert. Both vessels were moved to Rozelle in late June 2024.

In June 2024, Betty Cuthbert and Evonne Goolagong were moved to Yamba by Polaris Marine tug Pegasus for scrapping.

On 28 October 2024, Nicole Livingstone was withdrawn from service and was used for parts at Balmain Shipyard before being moved to Rozelle Bay, followed by a final movement to Yamba under tow where she was broken up in early 2025.

On 4 February 2025, Marlene Mathews was withdrawn from service. The vessel was then used for parts at Balmain Shipyard, before being moved via tugboat to Rozelle Bay.

On 3 June 2025, Marjorie Jackson was withdrawn from service. She was then stripped of reusable parts at Balmain Shipyard, before being towed to Rozelle Bay where she was moored alongside sister vessel Marlene Mathews.

On 17 June 2025, MV Marlene Mathews and MV Marjorie Jackson were transferred by Polaris Marine tug EDI, up to Yamba for scrapping. By September 2025 both Marjorie Jackson and Marlene Mathews were scrapped.

On 30 September 2025, MV Shane Gould was withdrawn from service after her 32 year long career. She was used as a parts source until early November 2025, before being briefly moved to Rozelle. In the early hours of 17 November 2025, Shane Gould left Sydney under tow bound for Yamba by Polaris Marine tug Molly Grace. She arrived in Yamba in the morning of 19 November 2025 and was put up onto land on 21 November 2025. On 24 November 2025, scrapping began on the MV Shane Gould. By February 2026, scrapping had been fully completed.

MV Dawn Fraser, the last vessel of her class in service, was withdrawn on 9 March 2026, and was transferred to Polaris Marine Group, Rozelle Bay, on 13 March 2026. In the afternoon of 30 March 2026, Dawn Fraser left Sydney under tow for Yamba by Polaris Marine tug Leaders Creek. Arriving at Yamba on 2 April 2026, Dawn Fraser was bought up onto land on 9 April to be broken up, with the process being completed by 20 May 2026.

== Vessels ==
Photo of vessel	Name	Call sign	MMSI	Builder	Shipyard no.	Year launched	Namesake	Notes
MV Betty Cuthbert at Circular Quay, 2016.	Betty Cuthbert	18555	503376100	NQEA	181	February 1992	Betty Cuthbert	Withdrawn 16 February 2023
MV Dawn Fraser near Cabarita, 2026.	Dawn Fraser	18554	503376200	NQEA	180	February 1992	Dawn Fraser	Withdrawn 9 March 2026
MV Evonne Goolagong at Cockatoo Island, 2023.	Evonne Goolagong	18705	503376300	NQEA	186	May 1993	Evonne Goolagong	Withdrawn 7 June 2024
MV Shane Gould near Homebush Bay, 2025.	Shane Gould	18642	503376700	NQEA	184	January 1993	Shane Gould	Withdrawn 30 September 2025
MV Marlene Mathews passing Cockatoo Island, 2024.	Marlene Mathews	18643	503376600	NQEA	185	January 1993	Marlene Mathews	Withdrawn 4 February 2025
MV Marjorie Jackson near Barangaroo, 2025.	Marjorie Jackson	18706	503376400	NQEA	187	May 1993	Marjorie Jackson	Withdrawn 3 June 2025
MV Nicole Livingstone at Cockatoo Island, 2024.	Nicole Livingstone	19044	503241900	Wavemaster International		July 1995	Nicole Livingstone	Withdrawn 28 October 2024. Built as Nicole Stevenson, renamed after namesake returned to her maiden name.

== Attempted preservation ==
Several attempts have been made to try save the RiverCats, which have all ultimately failed. One of these attempts were made in November 2025 by the owner of Abbotsford point boatshed Roger Kyle, to save the Shane Gould and Dawn Fraser to be used for Christmas parties and other events along the Parramatta River and Sydney Harbour.

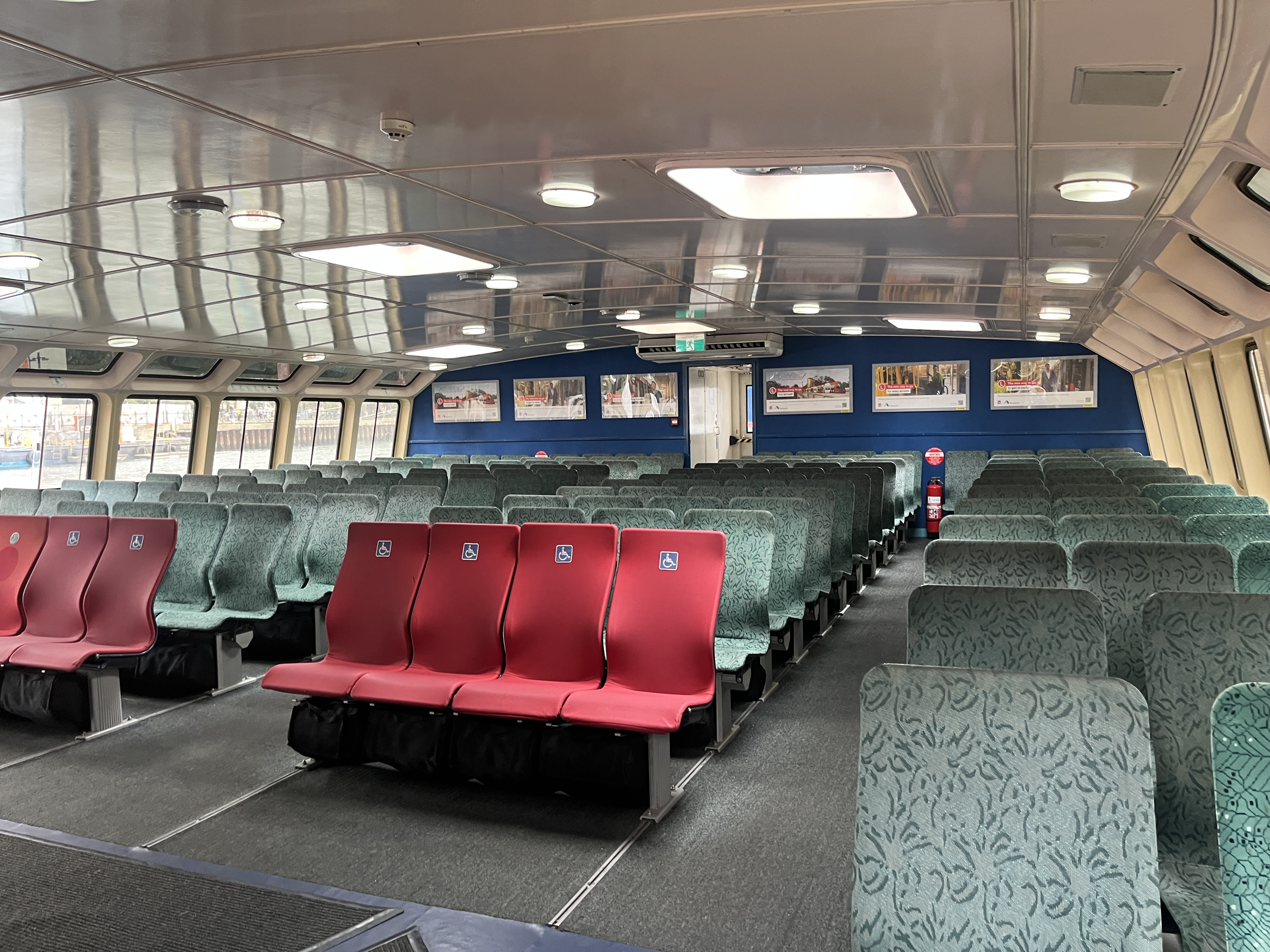
Interior of MV Dawn Fraser

== Incidents ==
In 1997, Marlene Mathews collided into a small wooden boat around Cockatoo Island.

On 23 September 2005, Betty Cuthbert collided into the bollard at Circular Quay Wharf 5 East and damaging the front bow.

On 11 January 2006, Betty Cuthbert collided into two moored vessels at Fern Bay.

On 7 August 2006, Betty Cuthbert collided into a Luxury Cruiser in Woolwich.

On 24 September 2006, Evonne Goolagong collided into a skiff near Cockatoo Island, injuring two people.

On 5 January 2007, Dawn Fraser collided with a dinghy carrying two people. The force of the collision left one of the dinghy's occupants injured while the other occupant was killed.

On 2 August 2010, Marjorie Jackson collided into the stern of Betty Cuthbert, which then force collided into the stern of the Evonne Goolagong in the Balmain Shipyard, causing Marjorie Jackson's starboard pontoon to be damaged.

On 7 October 2013, Marlene Mathews crashed into Circular Quay Wharf 5 West, injuring 6 people and damaging the front bow.
