= Bayview Park =

Bayview Park may refer to:

- Bayview Park, California, a census-designated place in Contra Costa County, California
- Bayview Park, Methil, a former association football stadium in Methil, Fife, Scotland
- Bayview Park, Ontario, a community in the township of Georgian Bay, Ontario, Canada
- Bayview Park, San Francisco, a park in southeast San Francisco, California
- Bayview Park ferry wharf, Sydney, a ferry wharf in Sydney, New South Wales, Australia
