= Kissing Point ferry wharf =

Ferry wharf in Sydney, Australia

Kissing Point
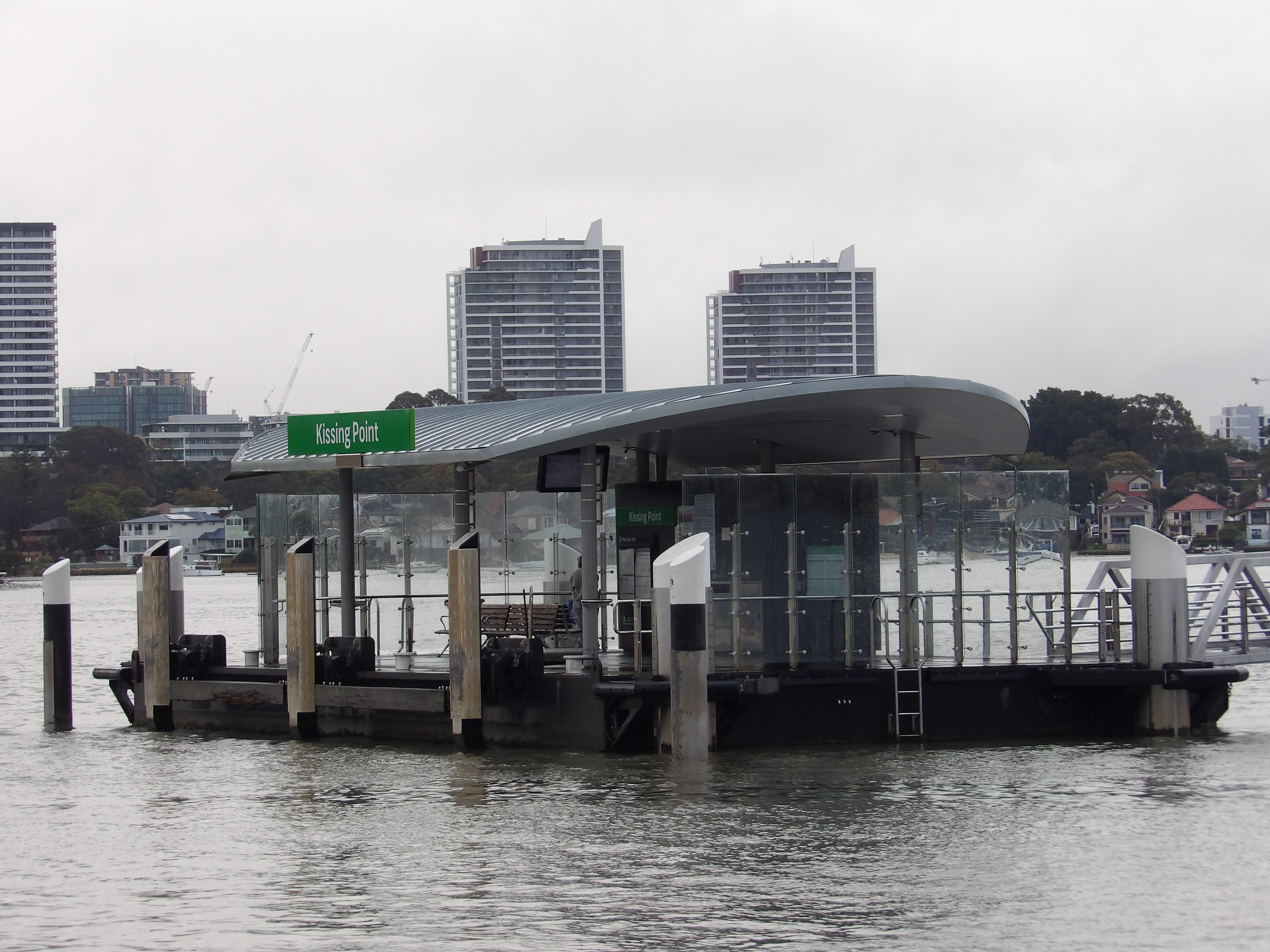
- Wharf in August 2025

General information
- Location: Kissing Point Park, Putney, New South Wales; Australia
- Coordinates: 33°49′54″S 151°6′7″E
- Owner: Transport for NSW
- Operator: Transdev Sydney Ferries
- Platforms: 1

Construction
- Accessible: Yes

Other information
- Status: Unstaffed

History
- Opened: 2 January 2000
- Rebuilt: 16 December 2020

Services
Preceding wharf	Sydney Ferries	Following wharf
Cabarita towards Circular Quay	F3 Parramatta	Meadowbank towards Parramatta
Location

Kissing Point ferry wharf is located on the northern side of the Parramatta River serving the Sydney suburb of Putney. It is served by Sydney Ferries Parramatta River services operating between Circular Quay and Parramatta.

== History ==
Kissing Point wharf opened on 2 January 2000.

It closed on 3 August 2020 for rebuilding with a floating pontoon to comply with the Disability Discrimination Act. It reopened on 16 December 2020.

== Services ==
Platform	Line	Stopping pattern	Notes
1	Parramatta River ferry service	Services to Circular Quay & Parramatta	
