= Balmain West ferry wharf =

Ferry wharf in Sydney, Australia

Balmain West
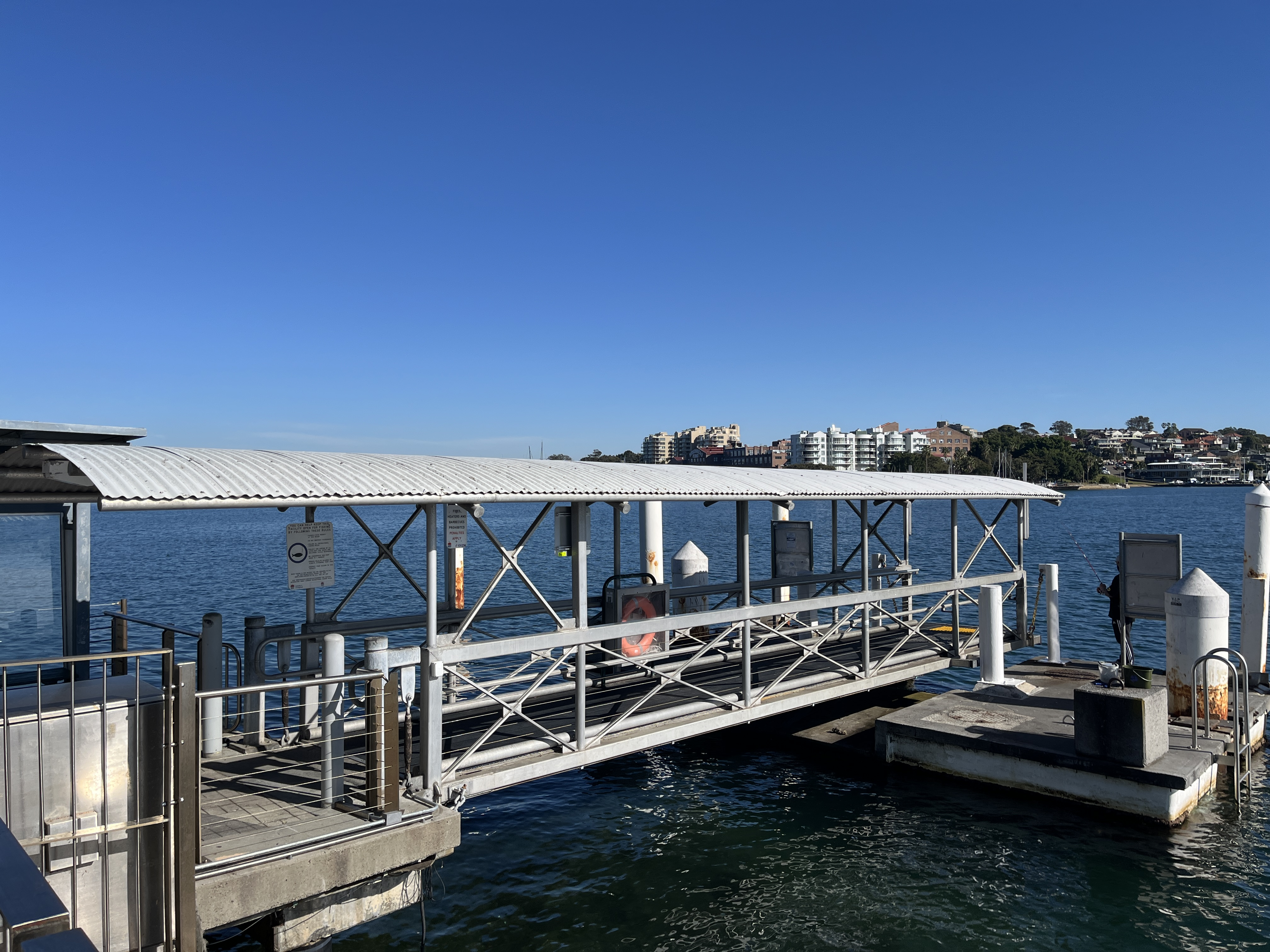
- Wharf in June 2025

General information
- Location: Elliott Street, Balmain, New South Wales; Australia
- Coordinates: 33°51′18.14″S 151°10′7.12″E
- Owner: Transport for NSW
- Operator: Transdev Sydney Ferries
- Platforms: 1

Construction
- Accessible: Yes

Other information
- Status: Unstaffed

History
- Former names: Elliott Street

Services
Preceding wharf	Sydney Ferries	Following wharf
Balmain towards Circular Quay	F3 Parramatta	Drummoyne towards Parramatta
Location

Balmain West ferry wharf is located on Iron Cove serving the Sydney suburb of Balmain.

== History ==
The wharf was named Elliott Street until renamed Balmain West in 1996.

Until October 2013, It was served by Sydney Ferries Parramatta River services operating between Circular Quay and Cockatoo Island. The service was withdrawn due to low patronage.

In November 2024 the Government of New South Wales announced Balmain West would reopen in the second half of 2025. The wharf reopened on 18 August 2025 with three peak hour Parramatta River services to Circular Quay in the morning and three to Chiswick in the afternoon.

== Services ==
Platform	Line	Stopping pattern	Notes
1	Parramatta River ferry service	Services to Circular Quay & Chiswick	
