= Cabarita ferry wharf =

Ferry wharf in Sydney, Australia

Cabarita
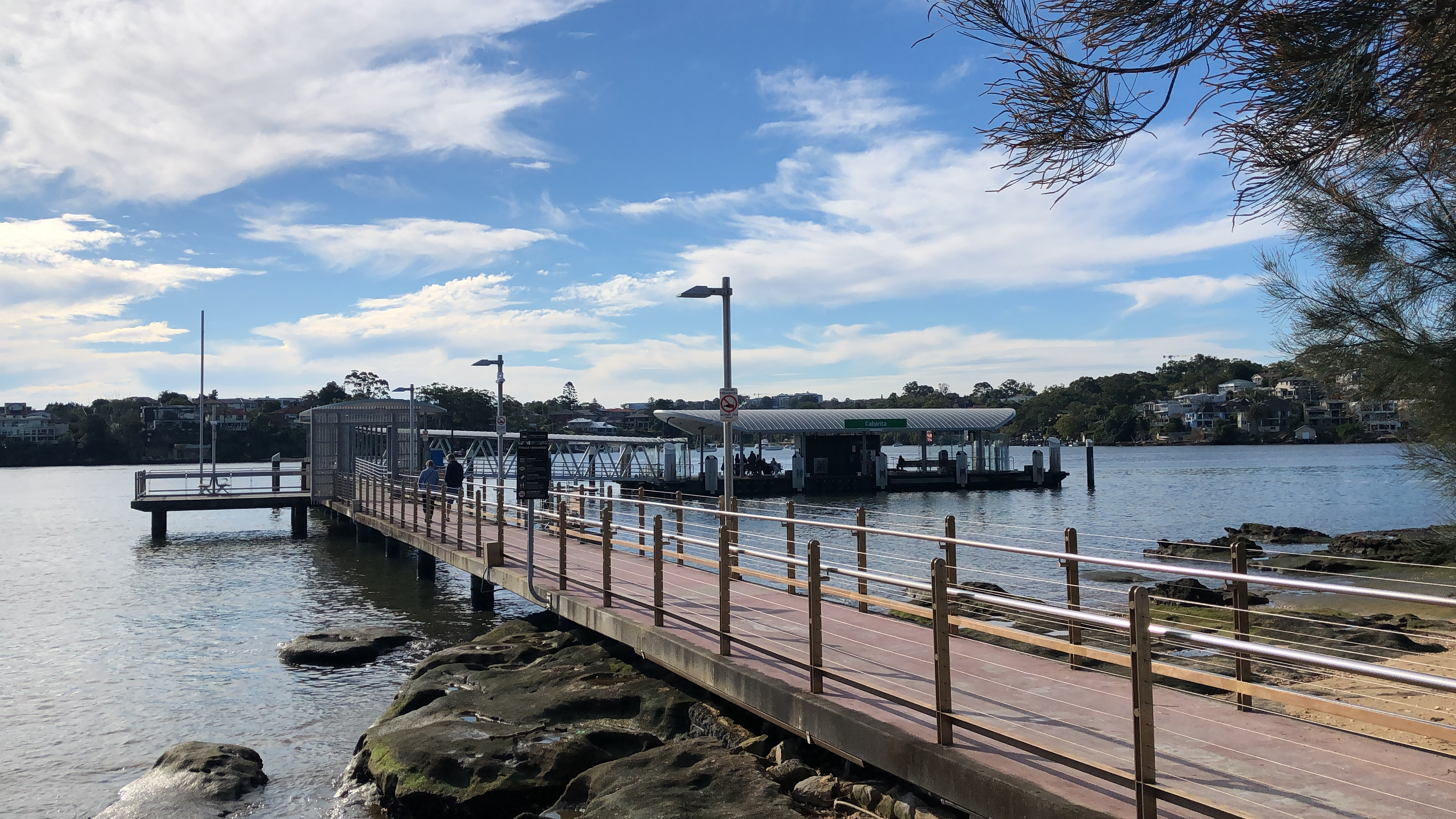
- Wharf in June 2024

General information
- Location: Cabarita Point Park, Cabarita, New South Wales; Australia
- Coordinates: 33°50′27″S 151°6′59″E
- Owner: Transport for NSW
- Operator: Transdev Sydney Ferries
- Platforms: 2
- Connections: Bus

Construction
- Accessible: Yes

Other information
- Status: Unstaffed

History
- Opened: 20 January 2000
- Rebuilt: 21 December 2018

Services
Preceding wharf	Sydney Ferries	Following wharf
Abbotsford towards Circular Quay	F3 Parramatta	Kissing Point towards Parramatta
Location

Cabarita ferry wharf is located on the southern side of the Parramatta River in the Sydney suburb of Cabarita. It is served by Sydney Ferries Parramatta River services operating between Circular Quay and Parramatta.

If was opened on 20 January 2000 in conjunction with improved transport services to Sydney Olympic Park for the 2000 Olympic Games. On 21 December 2018 an upgrade of the whar was completed with the pontoon replaced by one that could accommodate two vessels.

== Services ==
Platform	Line	Stopping pattern	Notes
1	Parramatta River ferry service	Services to Circular Quay & Parramatta	

== Transport links ==
Transit Systems operates two bus routes via Cabarita wharf:

- 466: to Burwood station
- 502: to Town Hall station
