= Rydalmere ferry wharf =

Ferry wharf in Sydney, Australia

Rydalmere
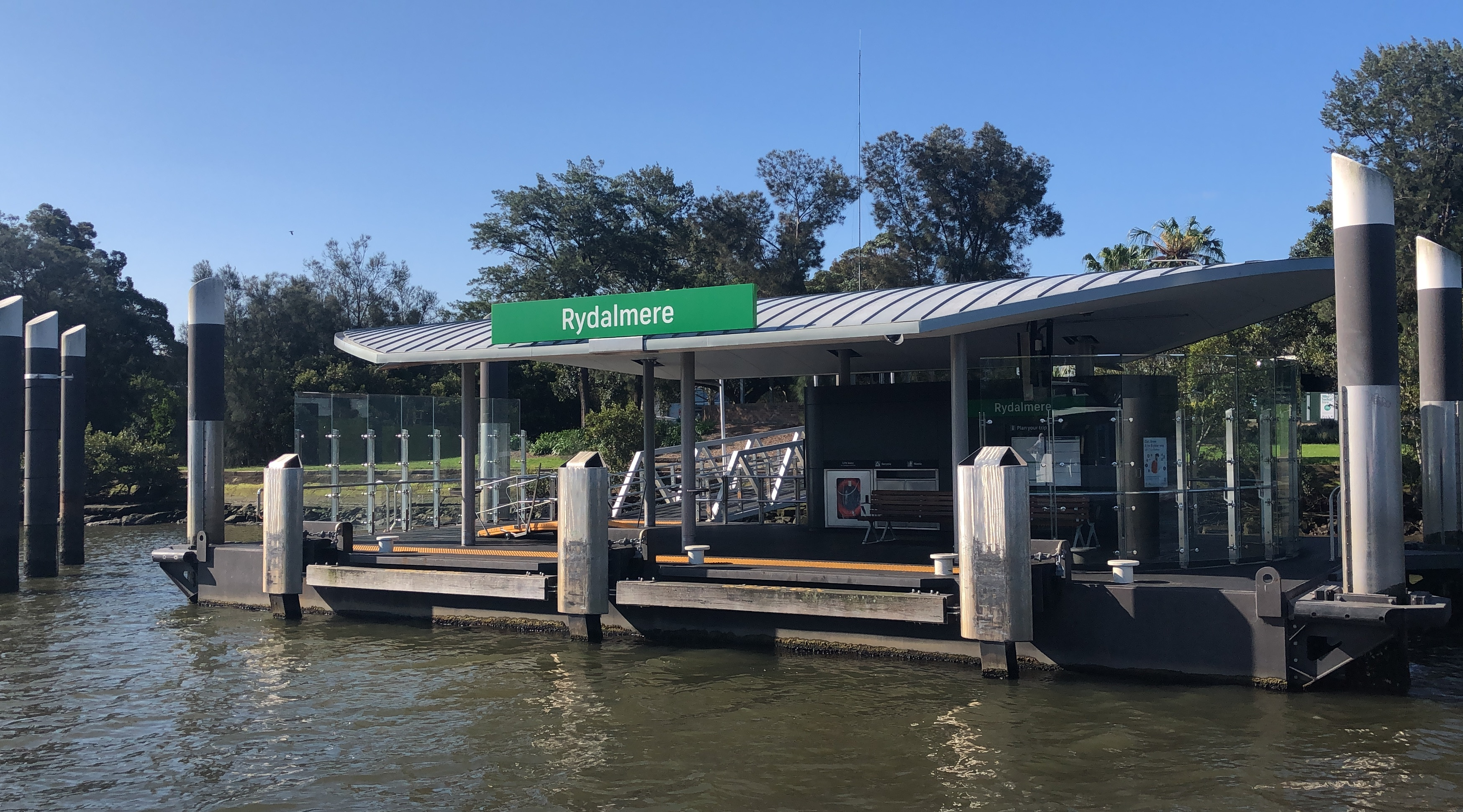
- Wharf in October 2024

General information
- Location: John Street, Rydalmere; New South Wales; Australia
- Coordinates: 33°49′5″S 151°2′37″E
- Owner: Transport for NSW
- Operator: Transdev Sydney Ferries
- Platforms: 1

Construction
- Accessible: Yes

Other information
- Status: Unstaffed

History
- Opened: 7 June 1993
- Rebuilt: 20 March 2019

Services
Preceding wharf	Sydney Ferries	Following wharf
Sydney Olympic Park towards Circular Quay	F3 Parramatta	Parramatta Terminus
Location

Rydalmere ferry wharf is located on the northern side of the Parramatta River serving the Sydney suburb of Rydalmere. It is served by Sydney Ferries Parramatta River services operating between Circular Quay and Parramatta.

== History ==
Rydalmere wharf was opened on 7 June 1993 when ferry services were extended from Meadowbank. On 9 December 1993 services were extended to Parramatta.

In October 2018, the wharf was closed for an upgrade. It reopened on 20 March 2019.

== Services ==
Platform	Line	Stopping pattern	Notes
1	Parramatta River ferry service	Services to Circular Quay & Parramatta	

During periods of low tide, services terminate at Rydalmere with passengers completing the final part of the journey on bus route 60F3 operated by Transit Systems.
