= Drummoyne ferry wharf =

Ferry wharf in Sydney, Australia

Drummoyne
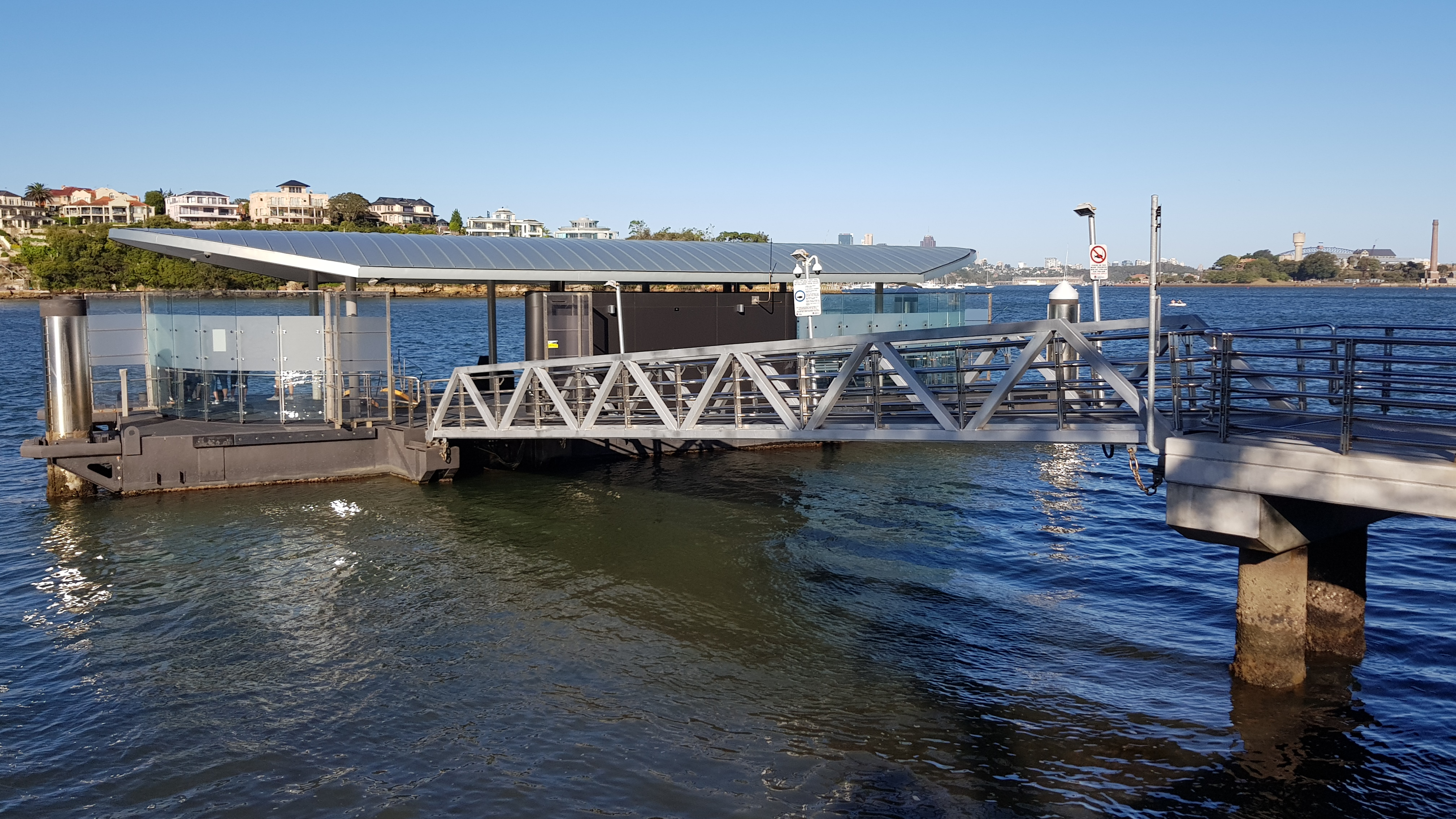
- Wharf in January 2018

General information
- Location: Wolseley Street, Drummoyne; New South Wales; Australia
- Coordinates: 33°50′44″S 151°9′26″E
- Owner: Transport for NSW
- Operator: Transdev Sydney Ferries
- Platforms: 1

Construction
- Accessible: Yes

Other information
- Status: Unstaffed

History
- Rebuilt: 17 September 2014
- Former names: Wolseley Street

Services
Preceding wharf	Sydney Ferries	Following wharf
Cockatoo Island towards Circular Quay	F3 Parramatta	Huntleys Point towards Parramatta
Balmain West towards Circular Quay	F3 Parramatta	Huntleys Point towards Parramatta
Location

Drummoyne ferry wharf is located on the southern side of the Parramatta River serving the Sydney suburb of Drummoyne. It is served by Sydney Ferries Parramatta River services operating between Circular Quay and Parramatta.

== Upgrade ==
On 30 April 2014, the wharf closed for a five-month rebuild to comply with the Disability Discrimination Act. The existing wharf was demolished, with a new one being built comprising a steel floating pontoon, a small concrete fixed entry platform and an aluminium gangway connecting the entry platform to the pontoon. It reopened on 17 September 2014.

== Services ==
Platform	Line	Stopping pattern	Notes
1	Parramatta River ferry service	Services to Circular Quay & Parramatta	
