= Huntleys Point ferry wharf =

Ferry wharf in Sydney, Australia

Huntleys Point
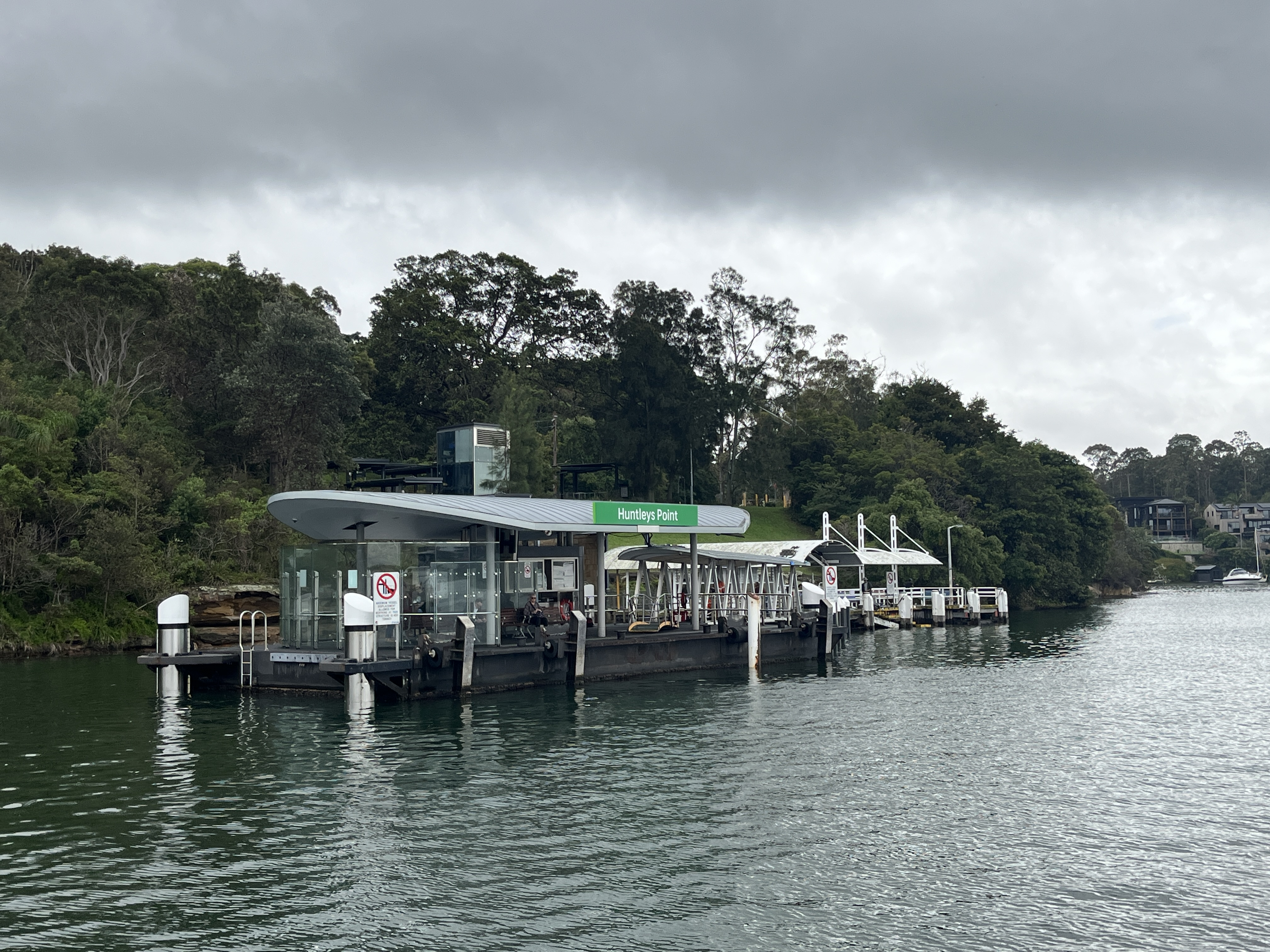
- Wharf in February 2025

General information
- Location: Huntleys Point Road, Huntleys Point; New South Wales; Australia
- Coordinates: 33°50′31″S 151°8′32″E
- Owner: Transport for NSW
- Operator: Transdev Sydney Ferries
- Platforms: 1

Other information
- Status: Unstaffed

History
- Rebuilt: June 1978; 27 July 2013

Services
Preceding wharf	Sydney Ferries	Following wharf
Drummoyne towards Circular Quay	F3 Parramatta	Chiswick towards Parramatta
Location

Huntleys Point ferry wharf is located on the northern side of the Parramatta River serving the suburb of Huntleys Point. It is served by Sydney Ferries Parramatta River services operating between Circular Quay and Parramatta.

== History ==
In June 1978, a new wharf site opened after the previous one was condemned. On 27 July 2023, the wharf reopened after a rebuild that included a floating pontoon. In June 2016 an elevator was opened to comply with the Disability Discrimination Act.

== Services ==
Platform	Line	Stopping pattern	Notes
1	Parramatta River ferry service	Services to Circular Quay & Parramatta	
