= Abbotsford ferry wharf =

Ferry wharf in Sydney, Australia

Abbotsford
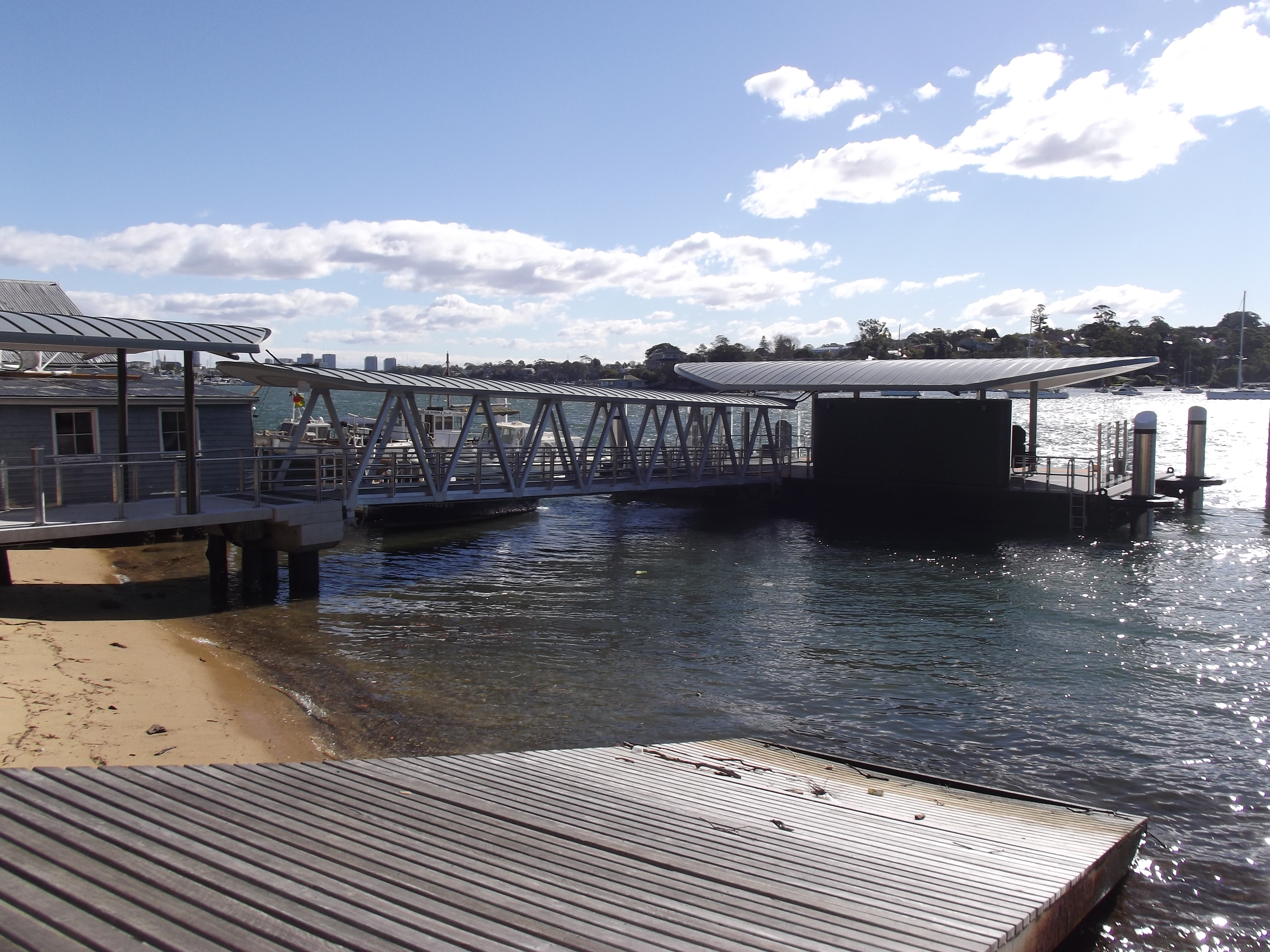
- Wharf in June 2018

General information
- Location: Great North Road, Abbotsford, New South Wales; Australia
- Coordinates: 33°49′54″S 151°07′04″E
- Owner: Transport for NSW
- Operator: Transdev Sydney Ferries
- Platforms: 1
- Connections: Buses

Construction
- Accessible: Yes

Other information
- Status: Unstaffed

History
- Rebuilt: 23 July 1998; 5 June 2018

Services
Preceding wharf	Sydney Ferries	Following wharf
Chiswick towards Circular Quay	F3 Parramatta	Cabarita towards Parramatta
Location

Abbotsford ferry wharf is located on the southern side of the Parramatta River in the Sydney suburb of Abbotsford. It is served by Sydney Ferries Parramatta River services operating between Circular Quay and Parramatta.

== History ==
A wharf at the present site was the southern end of Bedlam's Ferry, which existed from at least 1834. It was part of the historic route of the Great North Road, which continued on the north bank from Bedlam Point Wharf. In 1995 the Government of New South Wales announced the wharf woud be rebuilt. This was completed on 23 July 1998 when the rebuilt wharf was opened by Minister for Transport Carl Scully.

An upgrade to make the wharf compliant with the Disability Discrimination Act was completed on 5 June 2018 when reopened by Minister for Transport Andrew Constance.

== Services ==
Platform	Line	Stopping pattern	Notes
1	F3	Services to Circular Quay & Parramatta	

== Transport links ==
Transit Systems operates one bus route to and from Abbotsford wharf:

- 438X/438N: to Martin Place
