= Parramatta River ferry service =

Ferry service in Sydney, New South Wales, Australia

F3 Parramatta River

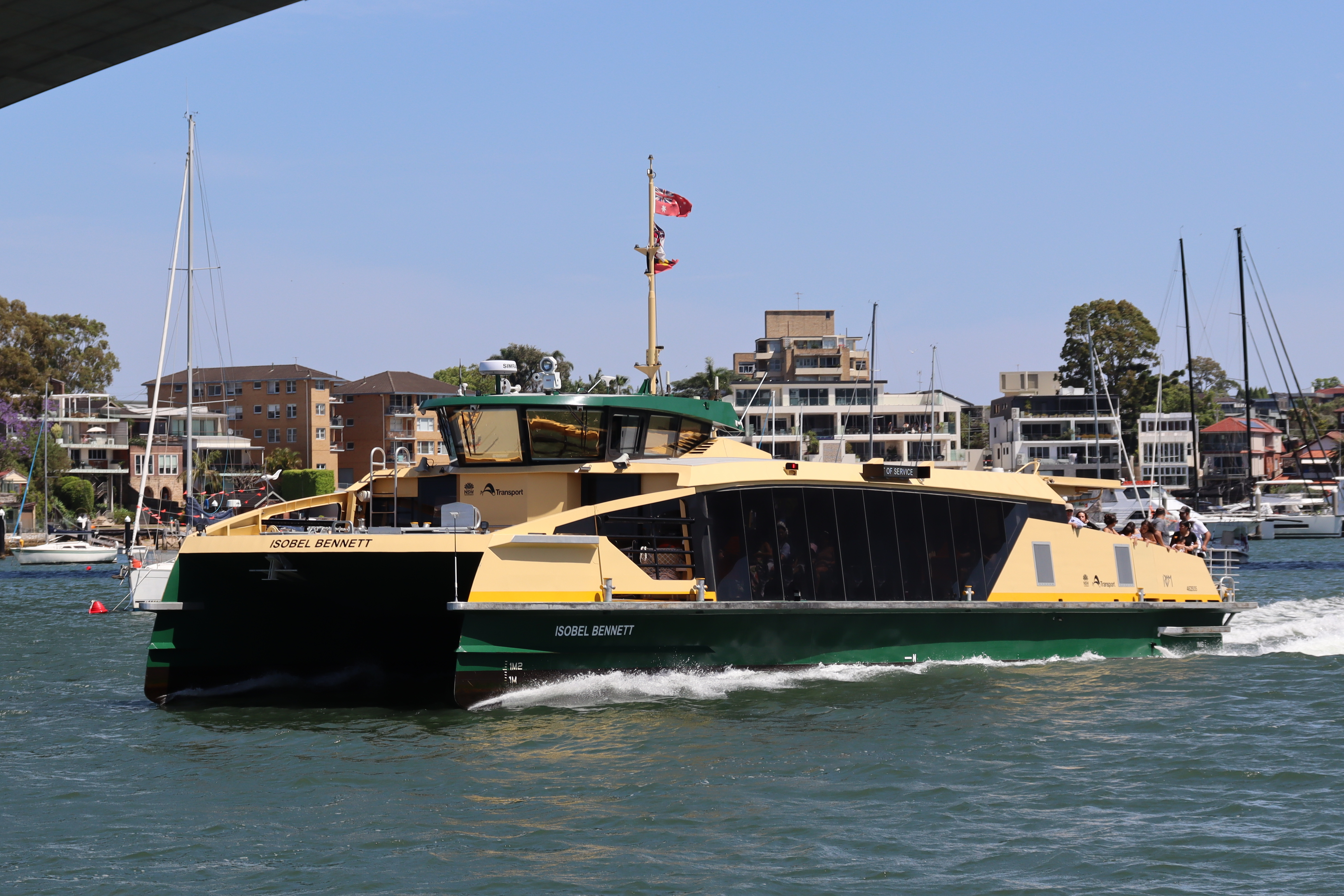
- Isobel Bennett in October 2025
- Waterway: Sydney Harbour, Parramatta River
- Owner: Sydney Ferries
- Operator: Transdev Sydney Ferries
- System length: 18 wharves, 27 km (17 mi)

The Parramatta River ferry service connects suburbs along the Parramatta River in Sydney with Circular Quay by commuter ferry. The service is numbered F3 and forms part of the Sydney Ferries network.

== History ==
Regular ferry services between Sydney and Parramatta began 2 June 1831, with the first steam ferry named Surprise. Early ferry services between Sydney Cove and Parramatta used paddle steamers.

Due to silting and pollution of the river, Sydney Ferries services on the Parramatta River ceased to serve the wharves west of Meadowbank in 1928. Meanwhile, changes in the design of ferries meant that the deep-hulled vessels were unable to go further upstream than the Meadowbank bridge. However, following dredging work and the introduction of the RiverCat catamarans, the State Transit Authority was able to resume services to Rydalmere and Parramatta in December 1993.

At one time, the New South Wales Government was keen to make extensive use of ferry transport to Sydney Olympic Park for the 2000 Summer Olympics. Although the Sydney Olympic Park ferry wharf was built and opened on 22 September 1997, at the western tip of Homebush Bay, its distance from the Olympic facilities meant that Olympic spectators were largely encouraged to use buses and trains.

In September 2006 Sydney ferries commenced a new peak service from Bayview Park Wharf to Darling Harbour King Street Wharf 3, later Circular Quay in 2011. Bayview Park was then Decommissioned in October 2013.

Between 2013 and 2021 all the Wharves along the Parramatta River service were upgraded to meet accessibility standards. Huntleys Point Wharf was the first to be upgraded with Kissing Point being the last to be upgraded.

On 26 June 2017 Barangaroo wharf opened to replace Darling Harbour King Street Wharf 3.

In 2021 10 new River-class ferries were built to replace the HarbourCats and SuperCats and also to boost service frequency on the Parramatta River. The last HarbourCat was retired on the 26th of July 2023.

Between 2024 and 2025 7 new Parramatta River-class ferries were built to replace the 7 RiverCat ferries on the Parramatta River. As of January 2026, all 7 of the Parramatta River-class ferries have entered service. The last RiverCat was retired on the 9 March 2026.

In August 2025, Balmain West wharf reopened after being closed for 12 years was added to the F3 Parramatta service.

All wharves along the F3 are accessible.

== Wharves ==
Name	Waterway	Suburbs served	Connections	Information on Wharf	Photo of Wharf
Circular Quay ferry wharf	Sydney Cove	Sydney CBD The Rocks	Manly ferry service Taronga Zoo ferry service Pyrmont Bay ferry service Neutral Bay ferry service Mosman Bay ferry service Double Bay ferry service Cockatoo Island ferry service Watsons Bay ferry service	Circular Quay is a major transport hub in Sydney, situated on Sydney Cove. It features a large wharf complex, a train station, a light rail stop, and bus connections on Alfred St. Sydney Cove was the site of the initial landing of the First Fleet in Port Jackson. Circular Quay was originally mainly used for shipping and slowly developed into a transport, leisure and recreational centre, and as Sydney's main tourist attraction point. Sydney Ferries services use wharves 2, 3, 4 and 5 at Circular Quay. Each wharf has ticket vending machines, ticket barriers, is staffed and is wheelchair-accessible.	
Barangaroo ferry wharf	Darling Harbour	Darling Harbour	Pyrmont Bay ferry service Blackwattle Bay ferry service	Barangaroo ferry wharf serves Darling Harbour and the Barangaroo precinct, with a pedestrian link to Wynyard train station and light rail stop. The Barangaroo Metro station is also a short walk away. Barangaroo features two large wharves (with two berths on each side) - namely Wharf 1 and Wharf 2 - and F3 services typically use Wharf 1.	
Cockatoo Island ferry wharf	Parramatta River	Cockatoo Island	Cockatoo Island ferry service	Cockatoo Island ferry wharf serves Cockatoo Island. Connections to other F8 wharves of Woolwich, Greenwich Point, Birchgrove and Balmain can be made here. Cockatoo Island features two berths.	
Drummoyne ferry wharf	Parramatta River	Drummoyne	No connections	Drummoyne ferry wharf serves the suburb of Drummoyne and is located on Wolseley Street, Drummoyne.	
Huntleys Point ferry wharf	Parramatta River	Huntleys Point	No connections	Huntleys Point ferry wharf serves the suburb of Huntleys Point and is located on Huntleys Point Road, Huntleys Point.	
Chiswick	Parramatta River	Chiswick	No connections	Chiswick ferry wharf serves the suburb of Chiswick and is located on Bortfield Drive, Chiswick. Bus connections that are a short walk away are 415 and 504.	
Abbotsford ferry wharf	Parramatta River	Abbotsford	No connections	Abbotsford ferry wharf serves the suburb of Abbotsford and is located on Great North Road, Abbotsford. A bus connection that is a short walk away is 438X/438N.	
Cabarita ferry wharf	Parramatta River	Cabarita	No connections	Cabarita ferry wharf serves the suburbs of Cabarita and Breakfast Point, and is located in Cabarita Park. A bus connection is 502, and 466 only a short walk away. Cabarita features two berths.	
Kissing Point ferry wharf	Parramatta River	Kissing Point	No connections	Kissing Point ferry wharf serves the suburb of Putney and is located in Kissing Point Park.	
Meadowbank ferry wharf	Parramatta River	Meadowbank	No connections	Meadowbank ferry wharf was the westernmost point in the Sydney ferry network until 1992. The wharf serves the suburb of Meadowbank and is located on Bowden Street, Meadowbank. A bus connection is 518.	
Sydney Olympic Park ferry wharf	Parramatta River	Wentworth Point	No connections	Sydney Olympic Park ferry wharf serves the suburbs of Sydney Olympic Park and Wentworth Point, and is located on Hill Rd, Sydney Olympic Park. The wharf was built in 1998 for the purpose of serving passengers for the Sydney 2000 Olympics, and served the RiverCat service which brought the Olympic Torch to the Olympic Stadium for the Opening Ceremony. It now serves residents of Wentworth Point and the neighbouring Rhodes. A bus connection is 526. The wharf features two berths and the majority of ferry services terminate here.	
Rydalmere ferry wharf	Parramatta River	Rydalmere	No connections	Rydalmere ferry wharf opened in 1992, and serves the suburb of Rydalmere and is located on John Street, Rydalmere. A bus connection a short walk away is 524.	
Parramatta ferry wharf	Parramatta River	Parramatta	No connections	Parramatta ferry wharf opened in 1992, and wharf serves the city of Parramatta and is located on the corner of Phillip and Charles Street, Parramatta. The wharf was upgraded in 2019 and surrounding precinct of Charles Street Square was given an upgrade in 2023. The free 900 shuttle bus to the CBD also depart from Phillip St at this wharf. Services between Rydalmere and Parramatta are replaced by buses during extreme low tides.	

=== Peak only/late night wharves ===
Name	Waterway	Suburbs served	Connections	Information on wharf	Photo of Wharf
Milsons Point	Lavender Bay	Milsons Point	Pyrmont Bay ferry service	(Morning Peak services to Circular Quay) (Evening Peak services to Chiswick via Balmain) (Evening Peak services to Sydney Olympic Park and Rydalmere running express between McMahons Point and Abbotsford	
McMahons Point	Lavender Bay	McMahons Point	Pyrmont Bay ferry service	(Morning Peak services to Circular Quay) (Evening Peak services to Chiswick via Balmain) (Evening Peak services to Sydney Olympic Park and Rydalmere running express between McMahons Point and Abbotsford	
Balmain	Mort Bay	Balmain	Cockatoo Island ferry service	(Morning Peak services to Circular Quay via Milsons Point) (Evening Peak services to Chiswick)	
Balmain East	Darling Harbour	Balmain East	Pyrmont Bay ferry service	(Late-night 7 day a week services to Circular Quay from Sydney Olympic Park ferry)	
Balmain West	Iron Cove	Balmain West	No Connections	(Morning Peak services to Barangaroo from Chiswick) (Evening Peak services to Chiswick)	

=== Former Wharves ===
Name	Waterway	Suburbs served	Wharf closed	Information on Wharf	Photo of wharf
Darling Harbour King Street Wharf 3	Darling Harbour	Darling Harbour	26 June 2017	Darling Harbour King Street Wharf 3 was the former interchange in Darling Harbour for Pyrmont Bay and Parramatta River services until 26 June 2017, when it was replaced by Barangaroo wharf.	
Bayview Park wharf	Hen and Chicken Bay	Concord	October 2013	Bayview Park ferry wharf commenced services from Bayview to Darling Harbour in September 2006, later to Circular Quay in 2011, and ceased in October 2013.	
Birkenhead ferry wharf	Parramatta River	Birkenhead Point	October 2010		

Wharves served by the F3 ferry

== Patronage ==
The following table shows the patronage of Sydney Ferries network for the year 2025.

2025-26 Sydney Ferries annual patronage by line (Note: Figures based on Opal tap on and tap off data)
Manly ferry service	4,532,938	View source data.
Taronga Zoo ferry service	1,545,805	View source data.
Parramatta River ferry service	2,429,310	View source data.
Pyrmont Bay ferry service	2,779,319	View source data.
Neutral Bay ferry service	562,998	View source data.
Mosman Bay ferry service	709,762	View source data.
Double Bay ferry service	273,741	View source data.
Cockatoo Island ferry service	535,934	View source data.
Watsons Bay ferry service	1,873,854	View source data.
Blackwattle Bay ferry service	17,970	

== Fleet ==
As of March 2026, there are 10 River class and 7 Parramatta River class ferries operating the F3 Parramatta River service.

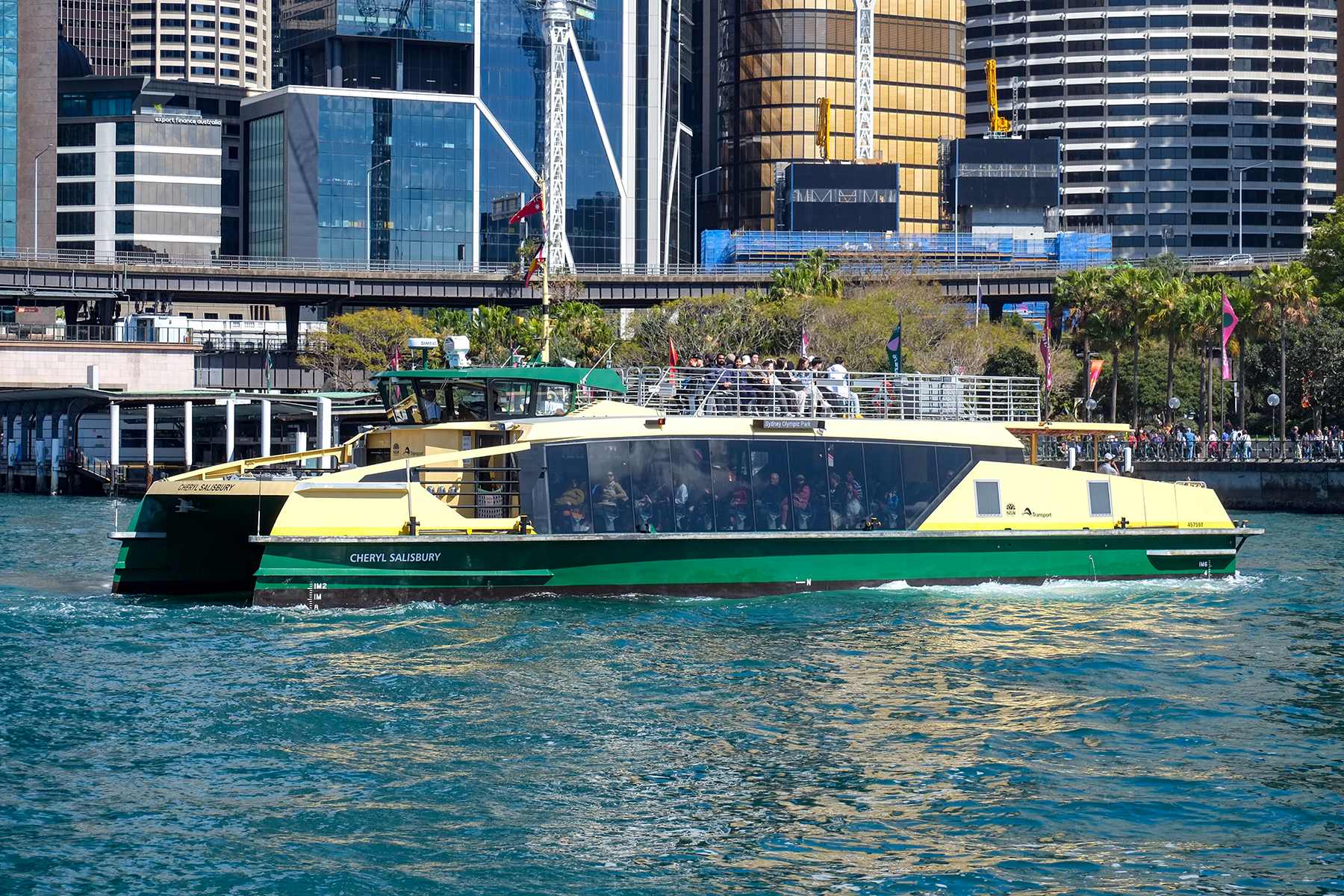
River-class ferry, since 2021

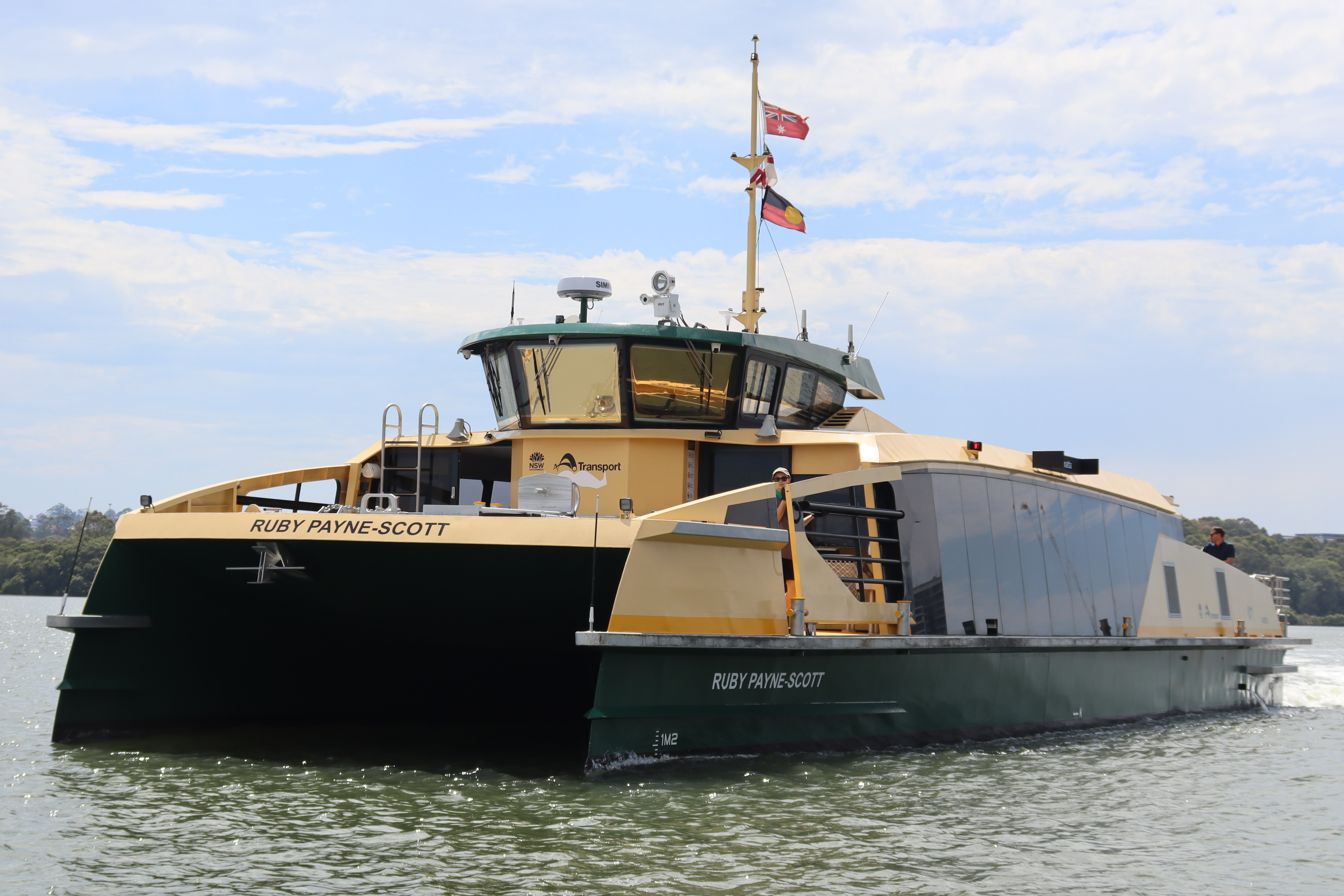
Parramatta River-class ferry, since 2024

=== Former Fleet ===
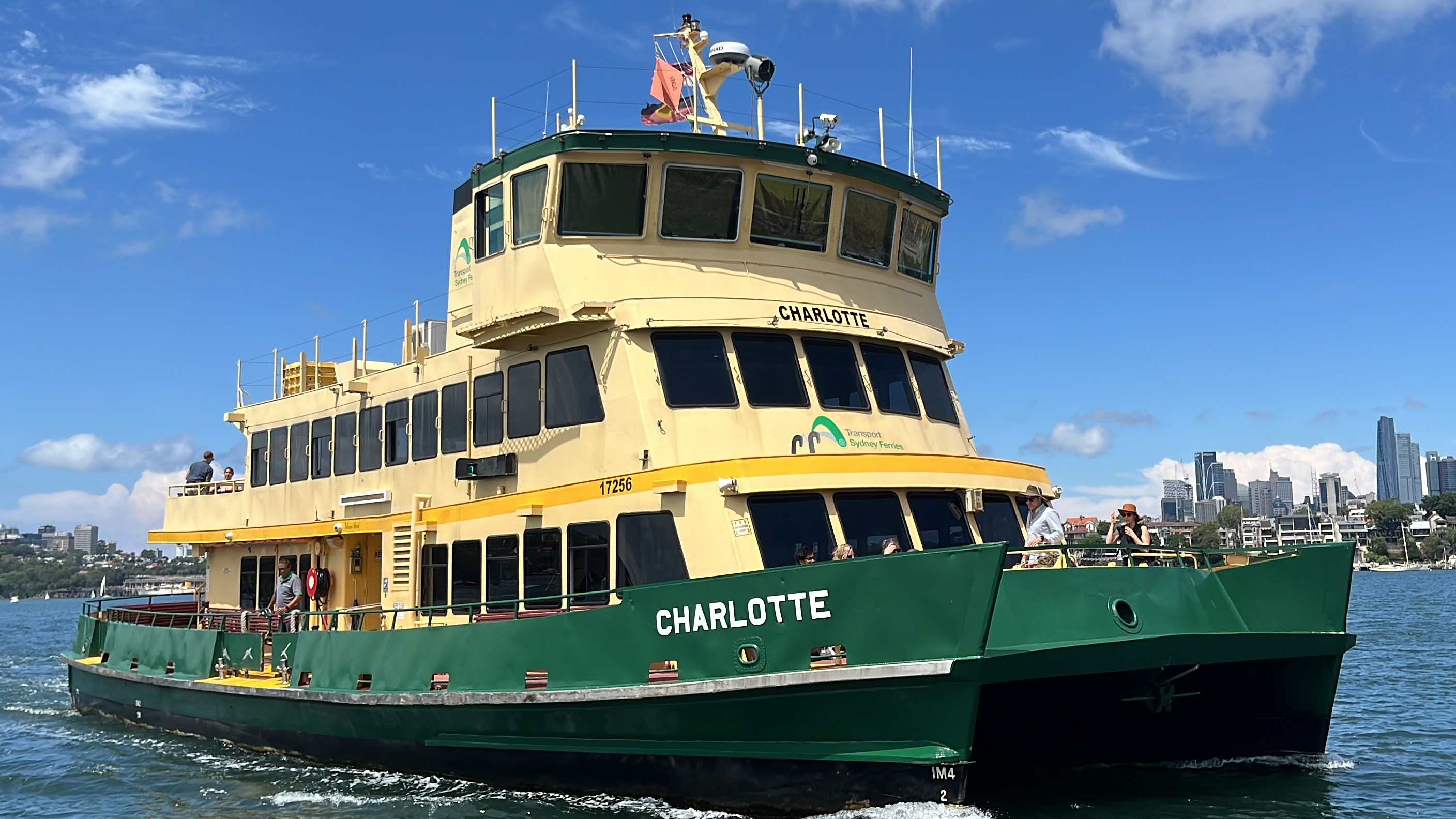
First Fleet-class ferry, 1984-1992

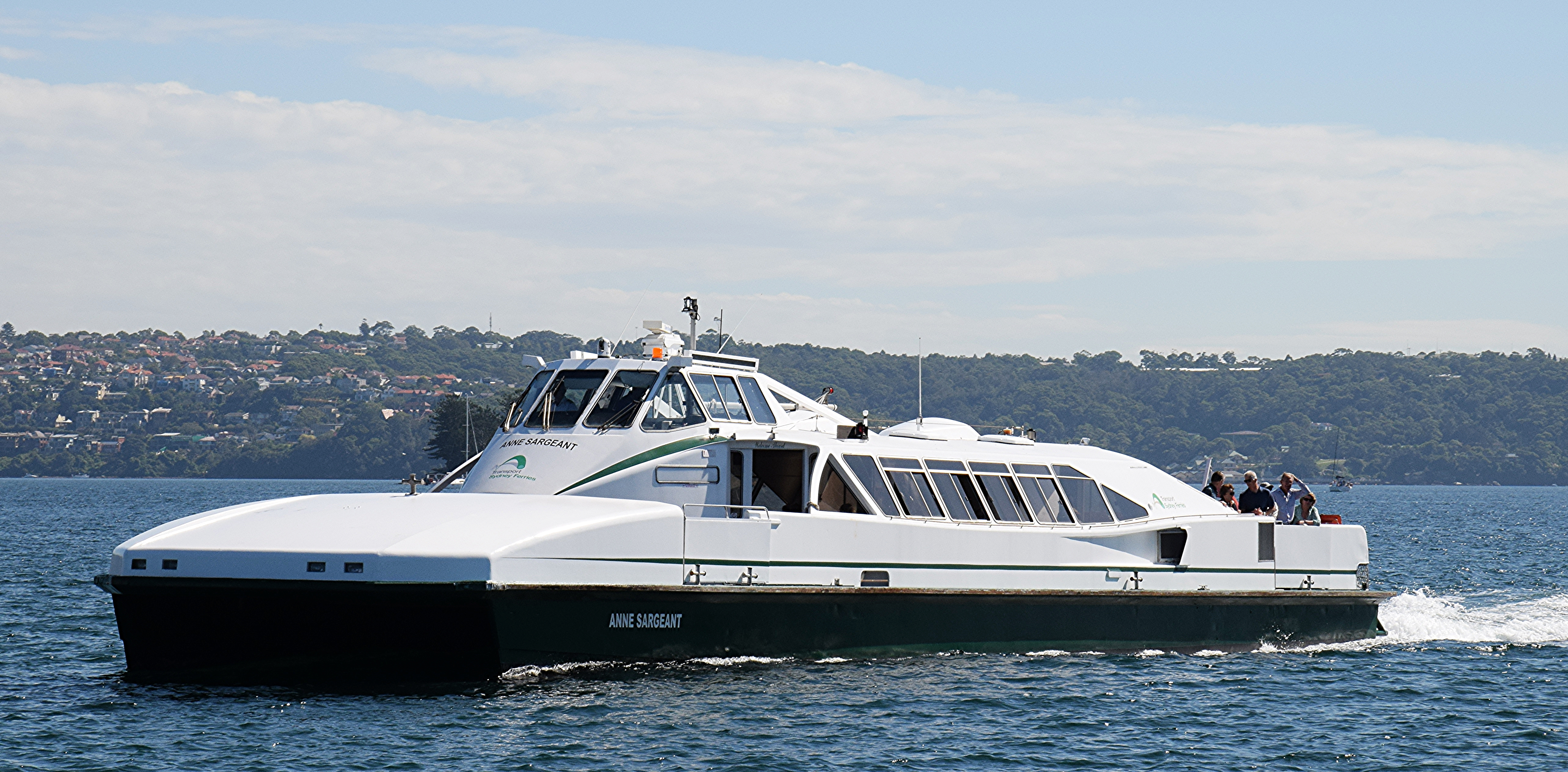
HarbourCat class ferry, 1998-2023

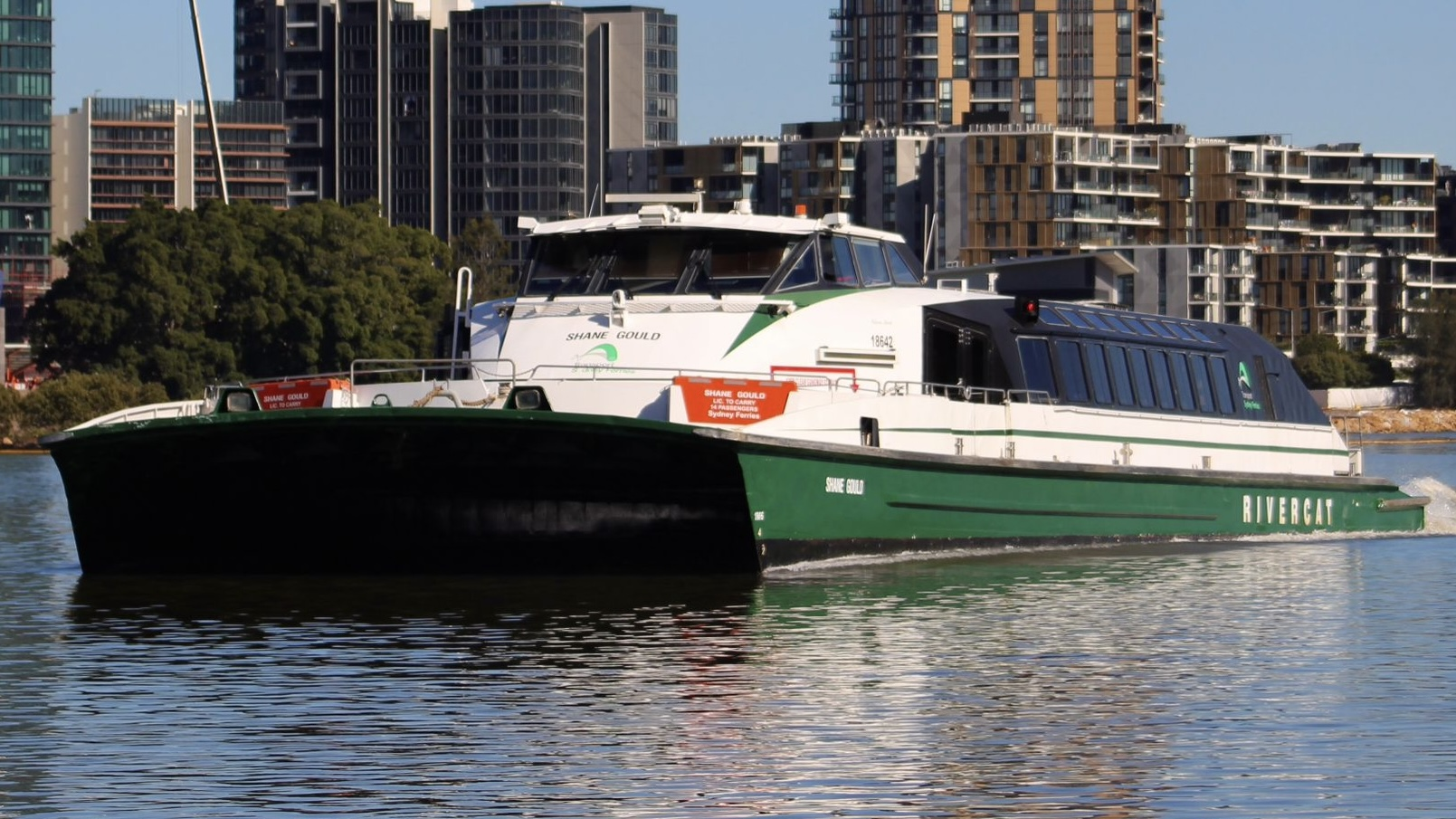
RiverCat-class ferry, 1992-2026
