= Meadowbank ferry wharf =

Ferry wharf in Sydney, Australia

Meadowbank
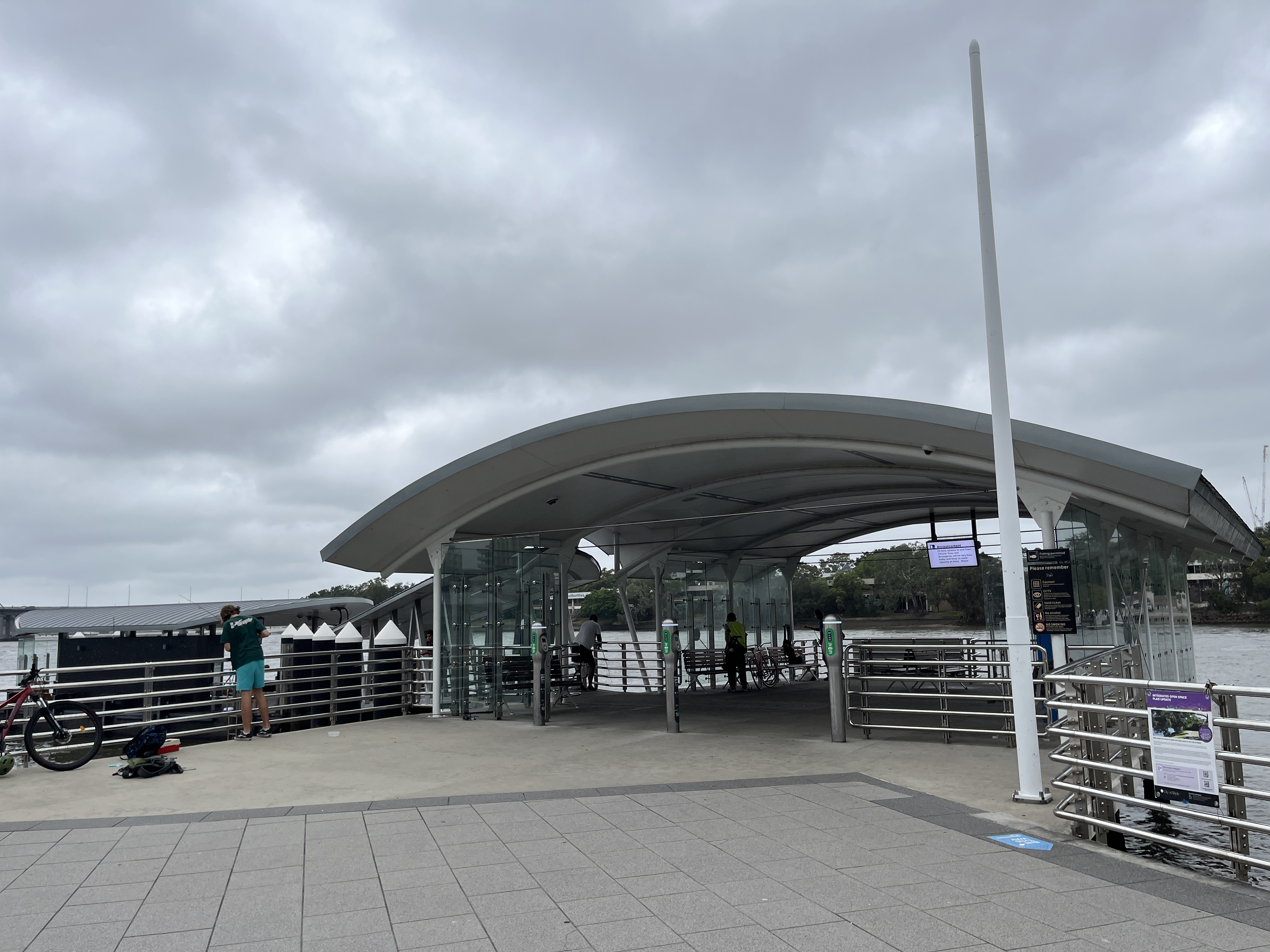
- Meadowbank wharf in March 2025

General information
- Location: Bowden Street, Meadowbank, New South Wales; Australia
- Coordinates: 33°49′16″S 151°5′24″E
- Owner: Transport for NSW
- Operator: Transdev Sydney Ferries
- Platforms: 1
- Connections: Bus

Construction
- Accessible: Yes

History
- Rebuilt: 26 May 2016

Services
Preceding wharf	Sydney Ferries	Following wharf
Kissing Point towards Circular Quay	F3 Parramatta	Sydney Olympic Park towards Parramatta
Location

Meadowbank ferry wharf is located on the northern side of the Parramatta River serving the Sydney suburb of Meadowbank. It is served by Sydney Ferries Parramatta River services operating between Circular Quay and Parramatta.

== History ==
Prior to the construction of the Ryde Bridge in the 1930s, Ryde wharf, located to the east of Meadowbank wharf at the current Ryde Bridge site, was the passenger wharf servicing the area.

Silt in the river and sludge from factory and industrial waste upstream led to the suspension of Sydney Ferries Limited services to Parramatta in 1928, with Meadowbank becoming the westernmost point for ferry services. Between 1969 and 1973, Stannard Brothers operated a service from Circular Quay to Meadowbank.

In December 1987, the Urban Transit Authority began operating services to Meadowbank with First Fleet class ferries. In June 1993, the State Transit Authority extended the service services to Rydalmere and in December 1993 to Parramatta with RiverCat class ferries.

In May 1989, Matilda Cruises introduced a peak hour service from Meadowbank to Darling Harbour.

In September 2015, an upgrade of the wharf commenced to make it comply with the Disability Discrimination Act. It was completed in May 2016.

== Services ==
Platform	Line	Stopping pattern	Notes
1	Parramatta River ferry service	Services to Circular Quay & Parramatta	

== Connections ==
Busways operates one bus route to and from Meadowbank wharf:

- 518: to Macquarie University
