= Sydney Olympic Park ferry wharf =

Ferry wharf in Sydney, Australia

Sydney Olympic Park
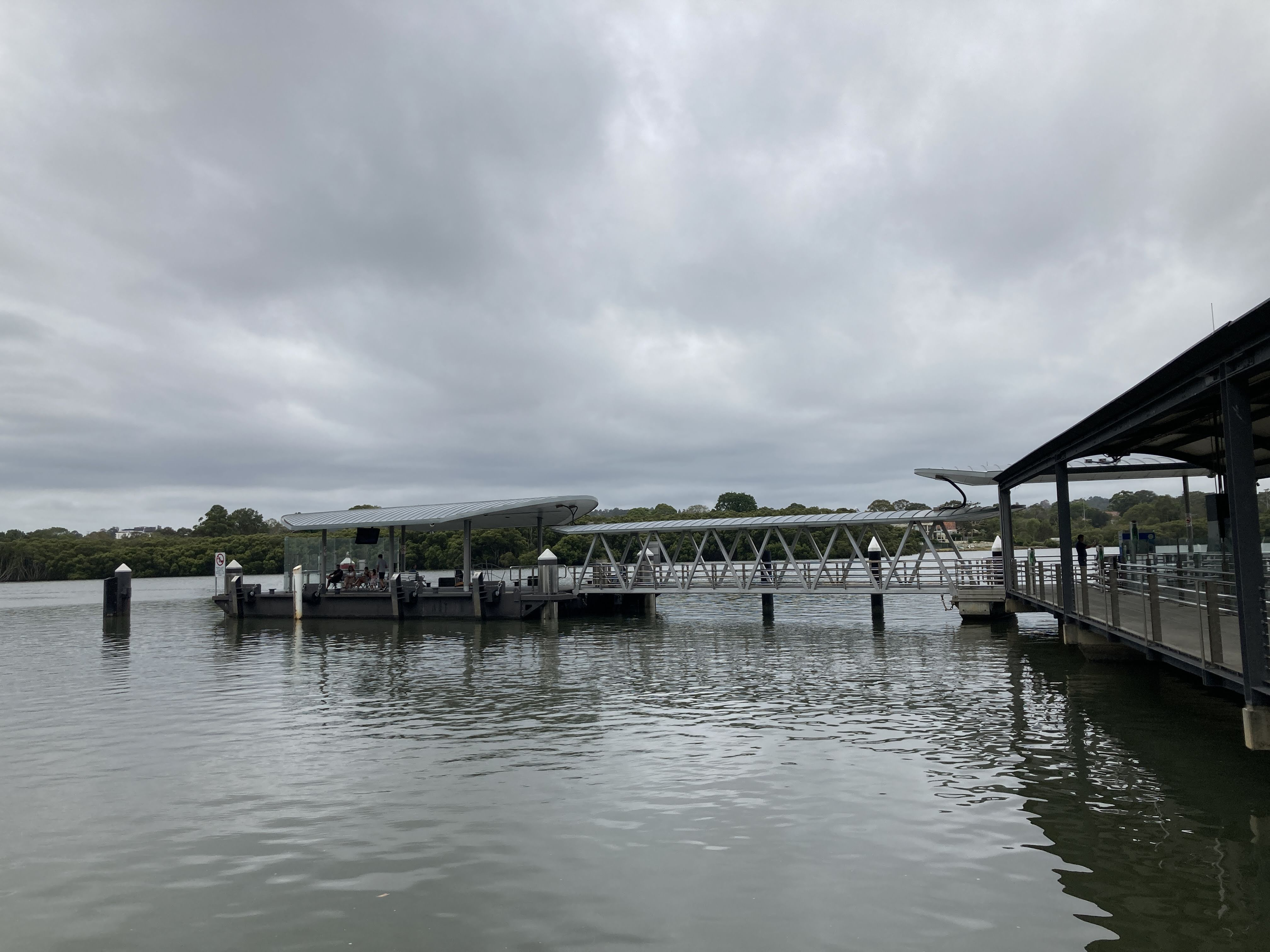
- Wharf in December 2022

General information
- Location: Hill Road, Wentworth Point; New South Wales; Australia
- Coordinates: 33°49′21″S 151°4′44″E
- Owner: Transport for NSW
- Operator: Transdev Sydney Ferries
- Platforms: 1 wharf (2 berths)
- Connections: Bus

Construction
- Accessible: Yes

Other information
- Status: Unstaffed

History
- Opened: 22 September 1997
- Rebuilt: 20 May 2015

Services
Preceding wharf	Sydney Ferries	Following wharf
Meadowbank towards Circular Quay	F3 Parramatta	Rydalmere towards Parramatta
Location

Sydney Olympic Park ferry wharf is located on the southern side of the Parramatta River serving the Sydney suburb of Wentworth Point. It is served by Sydney Ferries Parramatta River services operating between Circular Quay and Parramatta.

== History ==
Sydney Olympic Park wharf opened on 22 September 1997 to service the Sydney Olympic Park precinct for the 2000 Olympic Games.

On 14 January 2015, the wharf closed for a rebuild with services using the nearby Armory wharf. The wharf reopened on 20 May 2015.

In July 2023, the government adjusted suburb boundaries in the area, with Sydney Olympic Park ferry wharf transferring from the suburb of Sydney Olympic Park to Wentworth Point.

== Services ==
Platform	Line	Stopping pattern	Notes
1	Parramatta River ferry service	Services to Circular Quay & Parramatta	

== Transport links ==
Transit Systems operates one bus route via Sydney Olympic Park wharf:

- 526: between Rhodes Waterside and Strathfield station

Punchbowl Bus Company operates the Baylink Shuttle between Wentworth Point and Rhodes station.
