= Chiswick ferry wharf =

Chiswick
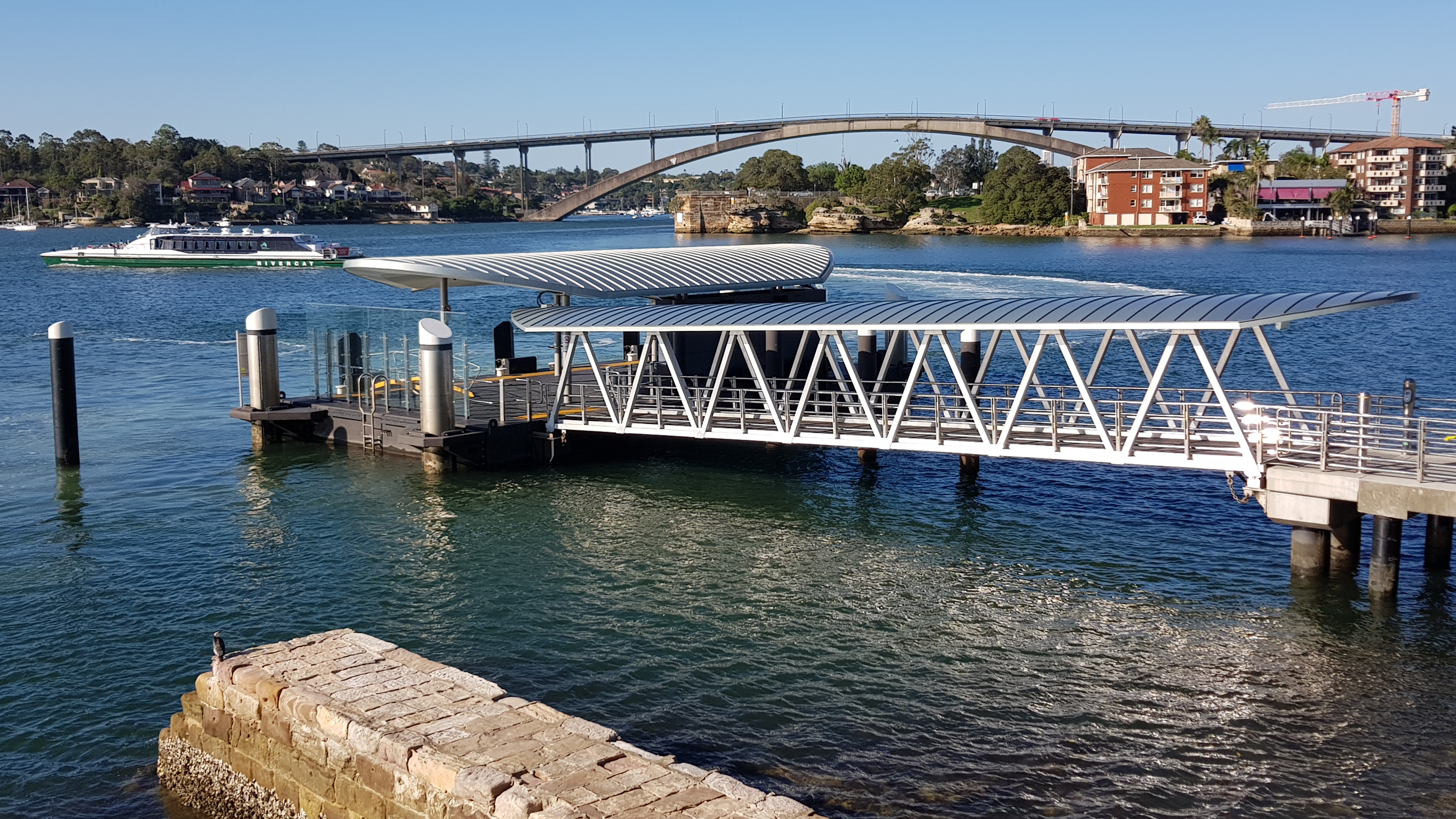
- Chiswick Wharf in April 2018

General information
- Location: Blackwall Point Reserve, Chiswick; Australia
- Coordinates: 33°50′44″S 151°8′30″E
- Owner: Transport for NSW
- Operator: Transdev Sydney Ferries
- Platforms: 1
- Connections: Bus

Construction
- Accessible: Yes

Other information
- Status: Unstaffed

History
- Opened: 20 March 1995
- Rebuilt: 31 July 2017

Services
Preceding wharf	Sydney Ferries	Following wharf
Huntleys Point towards Circular Quay	F3 Parramatta	Abbotsford towards Parramatta
Location

Chiswick ferry wharf is located on the southern side of the Parramatta River serving the Sydney suburb of Chiswick. It is served by Sydney Ferries Parramatta River services operating between Circular Quay and Parramatta.

== History ==
Construction on the original Chiswick wharf commenced in December 1994 with it opening on 20 March 1995. On 31 July 2017 a project to rebuild the wharf was completed that included a new pontoon.

== Services ==
Platform	Line	Stopping pattern	Notes
1	Parramatta River ferry service	Services to Circular Quay & Parramatta	

== Transport links ==
Transit Systems operates two bus routes to and from Chiswick wharf:

- 415: to Campsie station
- 504: to The Domain
