= Parramatta ferry wharf =

Ferry wharf in Sydney, Australia

Parramatta
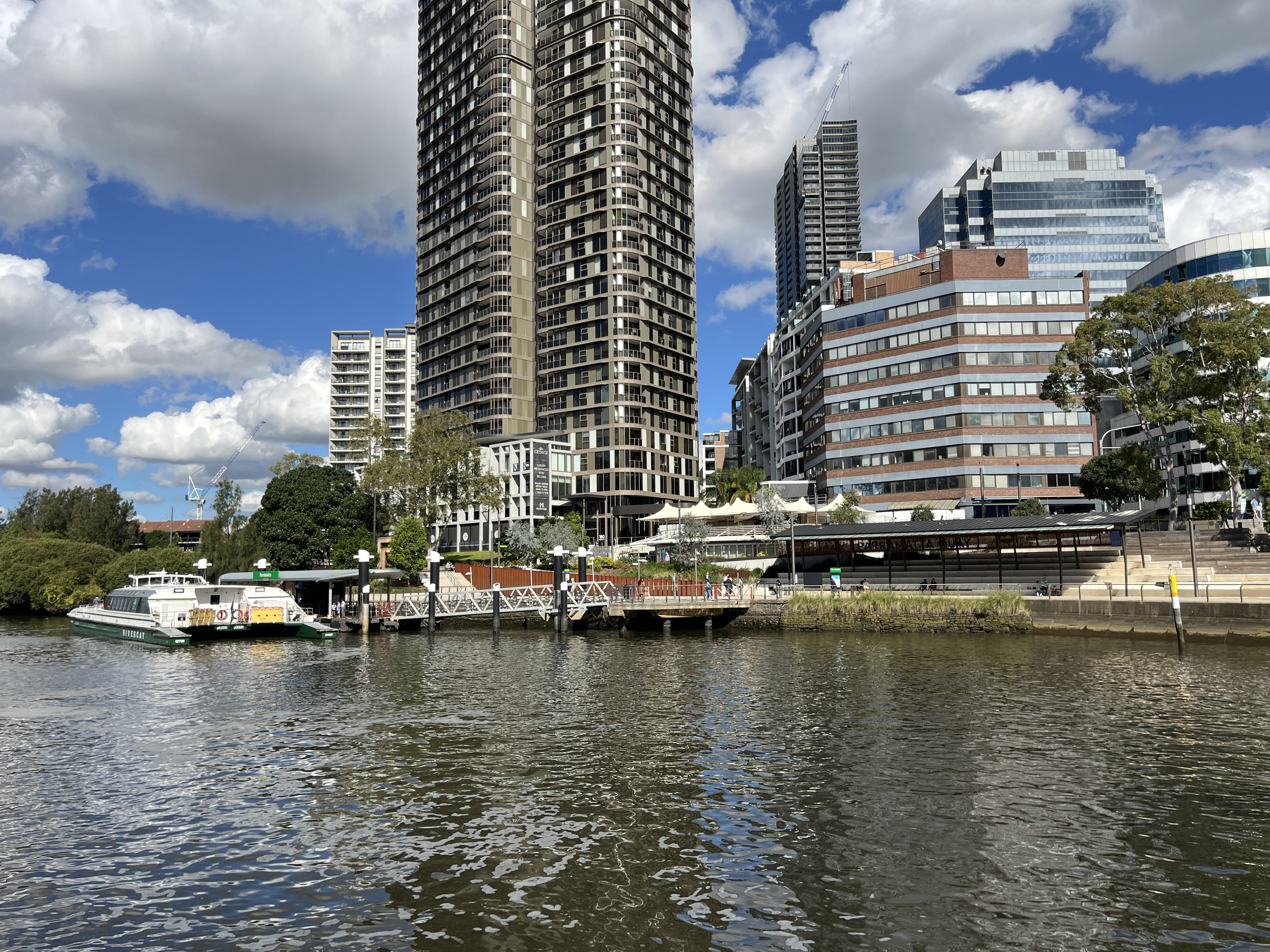
- Wharf in May 2025

General information
- Location: Charles Street, Parramatta; New South Wales; Australia
- Coordinates: 33°48′50″S 151°0′38″E
- Owner: Transport for NSW
- Operator: Transdev Sydney Ferries
- Platforms: 1
- Connections: Bus

Construction
- Accessible: Yes

Other information
- Status: Unstaffed

History
- Opened: 9 December 1993

Services
Preceding wharf	Sydney Ferries	Following wharf
Rydalmere towards Circular Quay	F3 Parramatta	Terminus
Location

Parramatta ferry wharf is located in the Sydney suburb of Parramatta. It is the terminus for Sydney Ferries Parramatta River services operating to and from Circular Quay.

== History ==
The wharf was originally built in Parramatta shortly after the establishment of the settlement. The wharf is located next to the Queens' Wharf Reserve and the Gasworks Bridge, close to the site of the first official landing place at Parramatta, when Governor Phillip and a small number of marines arrived in 1788 to establish a second settlement. The first steam ferry to operate between Sydney and Parramatta was named Surprise, beginning service on 2 June 1831. The original wharf was built by convicts from gum tree logs and reconstructed in sandstone in 1835. Paddle steamers regularly traveled upriver from Sydney Cove, carrying both goods and passengers..

In October 1883, a steam tramway began service connecting the wharf at Redbank, near the confluence of Duck River, the Parramatta River and the town of Parramatta which extended along George Street to Park Gates. The tramway closed on 31 March 1943. The trams conveyed both passengers and goods, serving a number of industries from sidings off the main line.

As a result of silting and pollution of the river, Sydney Ferries Limited services west of Meadowbank ceased in 1928. On 9 December 1993, the State Transit Authority resumed services to Parramatta.

In October 2019 the wharf was rebuilt to improve protection from the elements, expand the waiting areas and accomidate more efficient ferry boarding and alighting.

In November 2023, Charles Street Square which acts as a waiting area for Parramatta Wharf was rebuilt.

== Services ==
Platform	Line	Stopping pattern	Notes
1	Parramatta River ferry service	Services to Circular Quay	

During periods of low tide, services terminate at Rydalmere with passengers completing the final part of the journey on bus route 60F3 operated by Transit Systems.
