= Clifford Grant =

Australian operatic bass singer (1930–2021)

- Born: 11 September 1930; Randwick, Sydney, Australia
- Died: 7 October 2021 (aged 91); Greenwich Hospital, Sydney, Australia
- Occupation: Operatic bass singer

Clifford Scantlebury Grant OAM (11 September 1930 – 7 October 2021) was an Australian operatic bass singer.

== Life and career ==
Grant was born in September 1930 in Randwick, Sydney. In 1966, he joined Sadler's Wells Opera company and on 20 December 1974 he had his debut at the Royal Opera House in Mozart's The Marriage of Figaro, in the role of Doctor Bartolo. His Metropolitan Opera debut took place two years later when he created the role of Emperor Phorcas in the Met's premiere of Massenet's Esclarmonde. He retired from the stage in 1990.

He participated in numerous recordings of operas, such as Bellini's Norma, Esclarmonde, the collection of all late Italian operas by Mozart, Lakmé by Delibes, Donizetti's Lucia di Lammermoor, Meyerbeer's Les Huguenots, Puccini's Tosca, Verdi's Ernani, I Lombardi and Rigoletto, and Wagner's Ring cycle (sung in English, with Sadler's Wells Opera).

Grant died at the Greenwich Hospital on 7 October 2021, at the age of 91.
