= Birchgrove ferry wharf =

Ferry wharf in Sydney Australia

Birchgrove
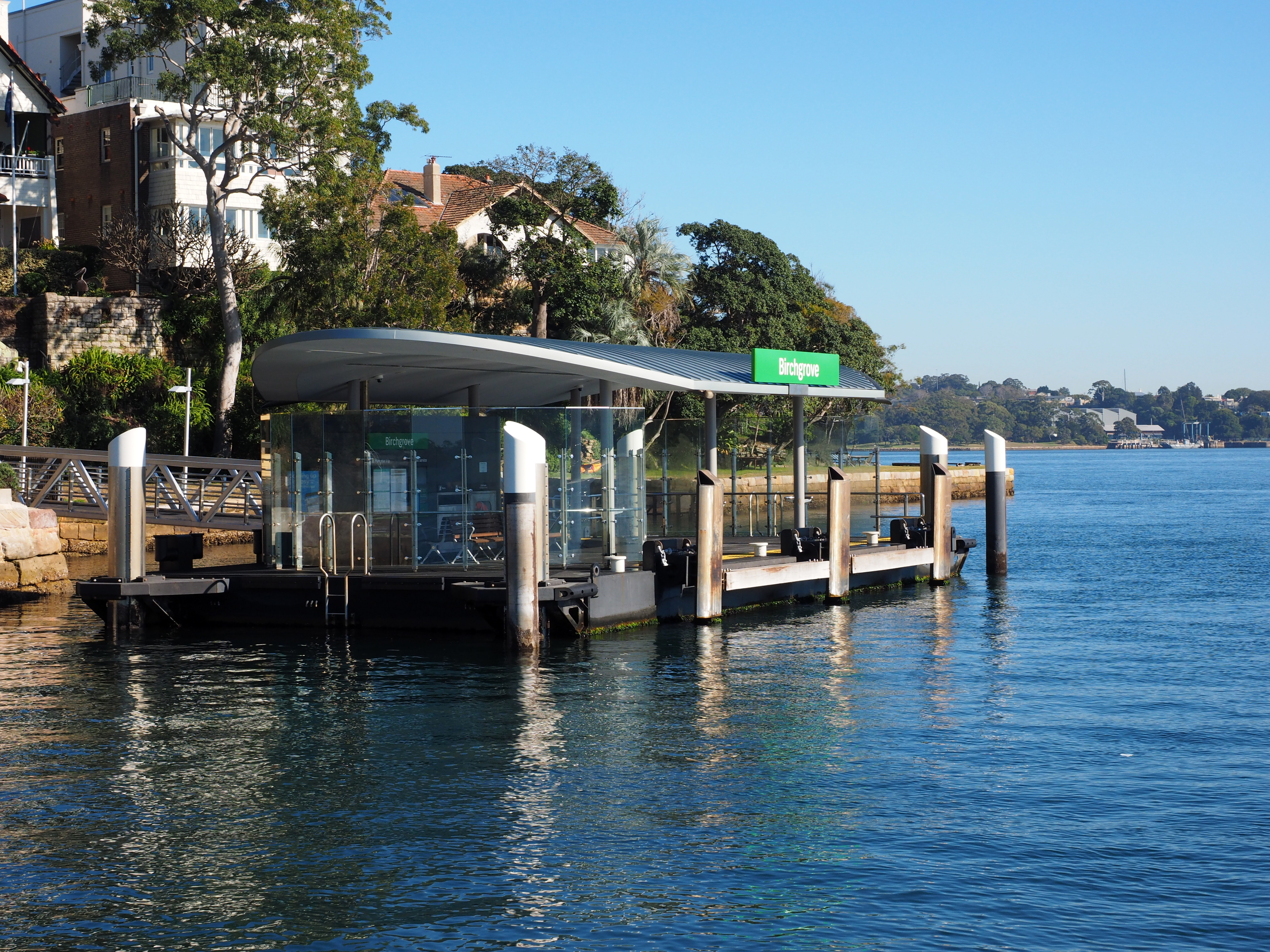
- Wharf in July 2019

General information
- Location: Louisa Road, Birchgrove, New South Wales; Australia
- Coordinates: 33°50′47″S 151°11′10″E
- Owner: Transport for NSW
- Operator: Transdev Sydney Ferries
- Platforms: 1

Other information
- Status: Unstaffed

History
- Former names: Longnose Point

Services
Preceding wharf	Sydney Ferries	Following wharf
Balmain towards Circular Quay	F8 Cockatoo Island	Greenwich Point towards Cockatoo Island
Location

Birchgrove ferry wharf is located on Sydney Harbour in the Sydney suburb of Birchgrove. It is served by Sydney Ferries Cockatoo Island services operating between Circular Quay and Cockatoo Island. It is also served by Captain Cook Cruises Lane Cove River services from Circular Quay to Hunters Hill.

It was named Long Nose Point until renamed in 1996.

Located near the wharf is a board which tells the Aboriginal history of the area.

The wharf was closed for an upgrade to comply with the Disability Discrimination Act on 17 October 2017, reopening on 24 April 2018.

== Services ==
Platform	Line	Stopping pattern	Notes
1	Cockatoo Island ferry service	Services to Circular Quay & Cockatoo Island	
1	Lane Cove River	Captain Cook Cruises services to Circular Quay & Hunters Hill	
