= Greenwich Point ferry wharf =

Ferry wharf in Sydney, Australia

Greenwich Point
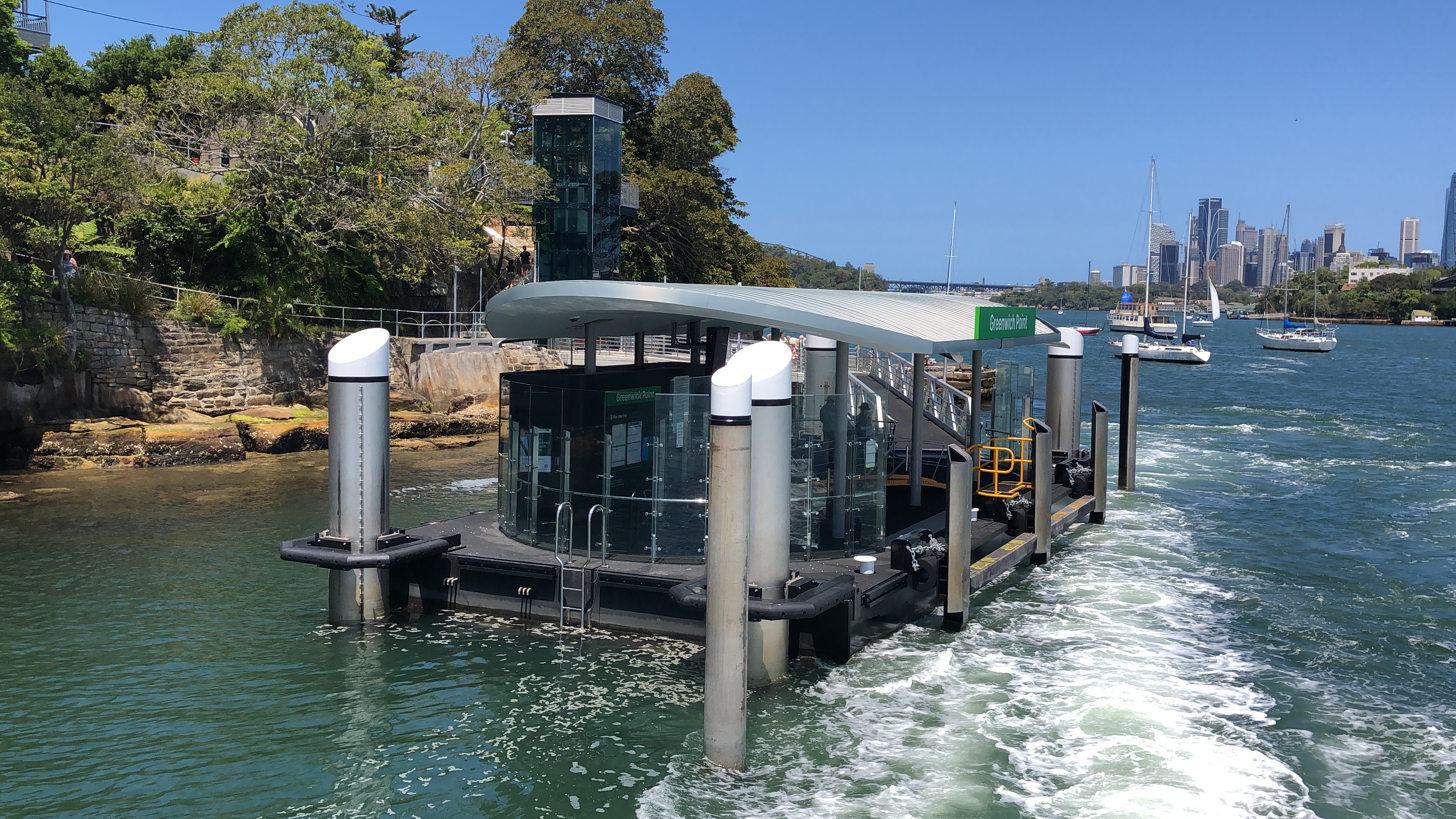
- Wharf in December 2024

General information
- Location: Lower Serpentine Road, Greenwich, New South Wales; Australia
- Coordinates: 33°50′31″S 151°10′51″E
- Owner: Transport for NSW
- Operator: Transdev Sydney Ferries
- Platforms: 1
- Connections: Bus

Other information
- Status: Unstaffed

History
- Rebuilt: 5 October 1981; 13 December 2024

Services
Preceding wharf	Sydney Ferries	Following wharf
Birchgrove towards Circular Quay	F8 Cockatoo Island	Woolwich towards Cockatoo Island
Location

Greenwich Point ferry wharf is located on Sydney Harbour serving the suburb of Greenwich. It is served by Sydney Ferries Cockatoo Island services operating between Circular Quay and Cockatoo Island. It is also served by Captain Cook Cruises Lane Cove River services from Circular Quay to Hunters Hill.

== History ==
In January 1981 the original wharf was demolished and replaced by a new concrete one that opened on 5 October 1981.

On 22 April 2024, the wharf closed and was demoished to be replaced by a floating pontoon along with an elevator to street level in a project overseen by Besix Watpac to comply with the Disability Discrimination Act. The wharf reopened on 13 December 2024.

== Services ==
Platform	Line	Stopping pattern	Notes
1	Cockatoo Island ferry service	Services to Circular Quay & Cockatoo Island	
1	Lane Cove River	Captain Cook Cruises services to Circular Quay & Hunters Hill	

== Transport links ==
Busways operate two routes from Greenwich Point wharf:

- 265 to Lane Cove and North Sydney station
- 267 to Chatswood station
