= Woolwich ferry wharf =

Ferry wharf in Sydney, Australia

Woolwich
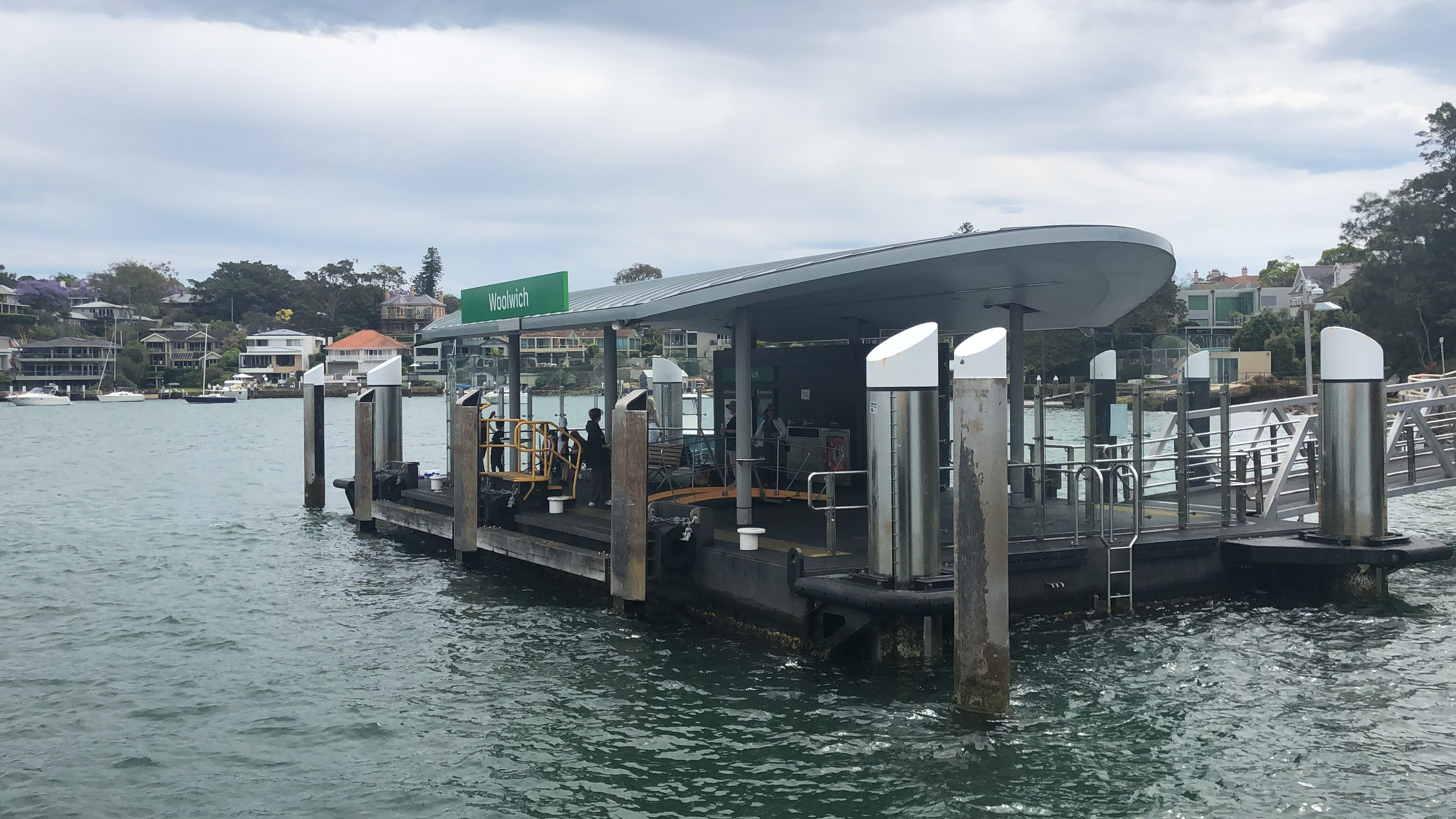
- Wharf in November 2024

General information
- Location: Valentia Street, Woolwich; New South Wales; Australia
- Coordinates: 33°50′20″S 151°10′34″E
- Owner: Transport for NSW
- Operator: Transdev Sydney Ferries
- Platforms: 1 wharf (1 berth)
- Connections: Woolwich Wharf, Valentia St

Construction
- Accessible: Yes

Other information
- Status: Unstaffed

History
- Former names: Hunters Hill (Woolwich), Valentia Street (–2002)

Services
| Preceding wharf | Sydney Ferries | Following wharf |
|---|---|---|
| Greenwich Point towards Circular Quay | F8 Cockatoo Island | Cockatoo Island Terminus |
Location

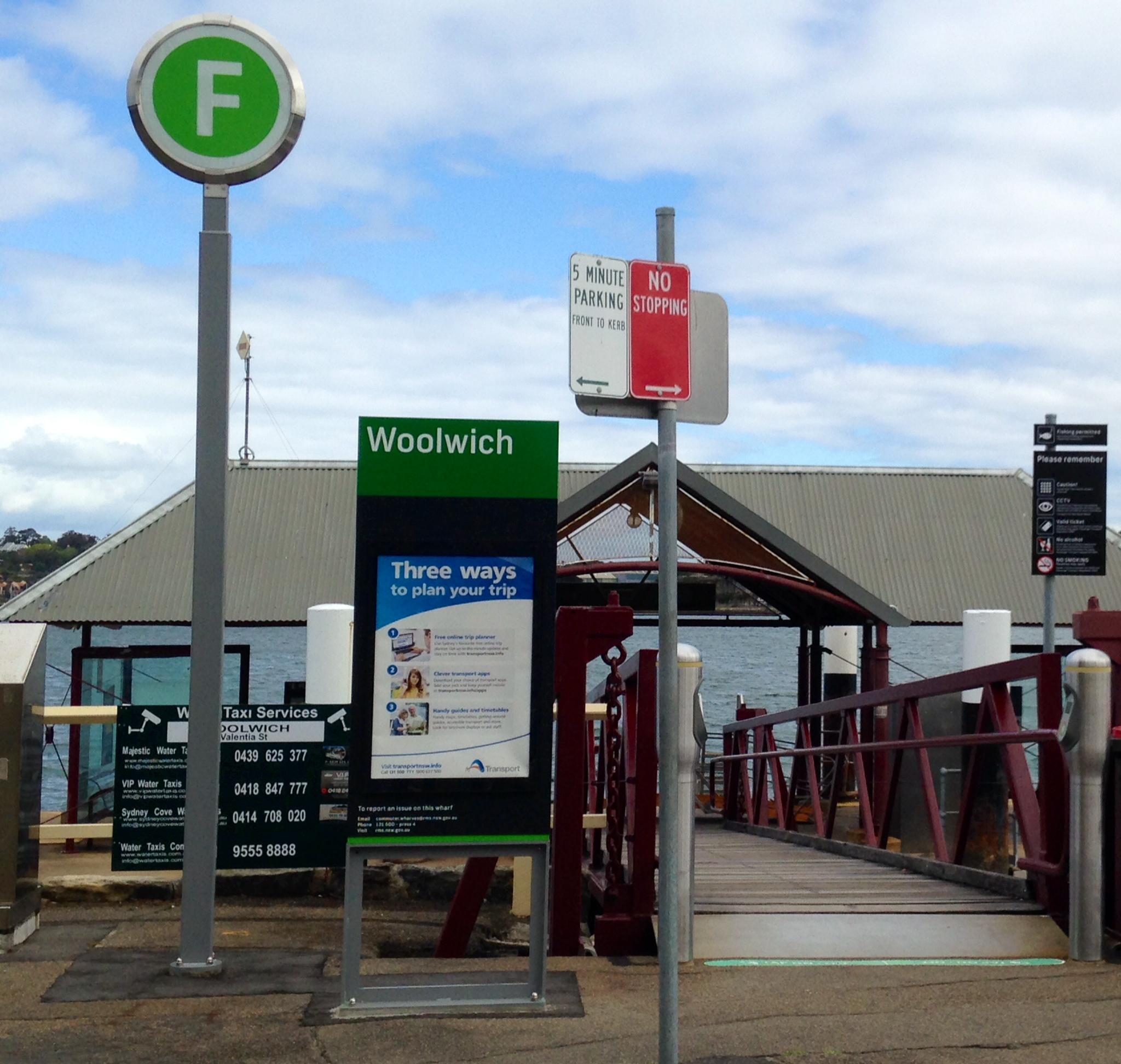
Woolwich Ferry Wharf before it was rebuilt

Woolwich ferry wharf (also known as Valentia Street ferry wharf) is located on Sydney Harbour serving the Hunters Hill suburb of Woolwich. It served by Sydney Ferries Cockatoo Island services operating between Circular Quay and Cockatoo Island. The single wharf is served by First Fleet and Emerald class ferries.

In September 2020 Woolwich Wharf was rebuilt to receive new shelter and seating along with waiting area refurbished

== Wharves and services ==
| Platform | Line | Stopping pattern | Notes |
| 1 | F8 | Services to Circular Quay & Cockatoo Island | |

== Connections ==
Busways operates two bus routes via Woolwich wharf, under contract to Transport for NSW:

- 505: to Town Hall (morning peak only)
- 538: to Gladesville
