= Greenwich, New South Wales =

Greenwich
- Suburb
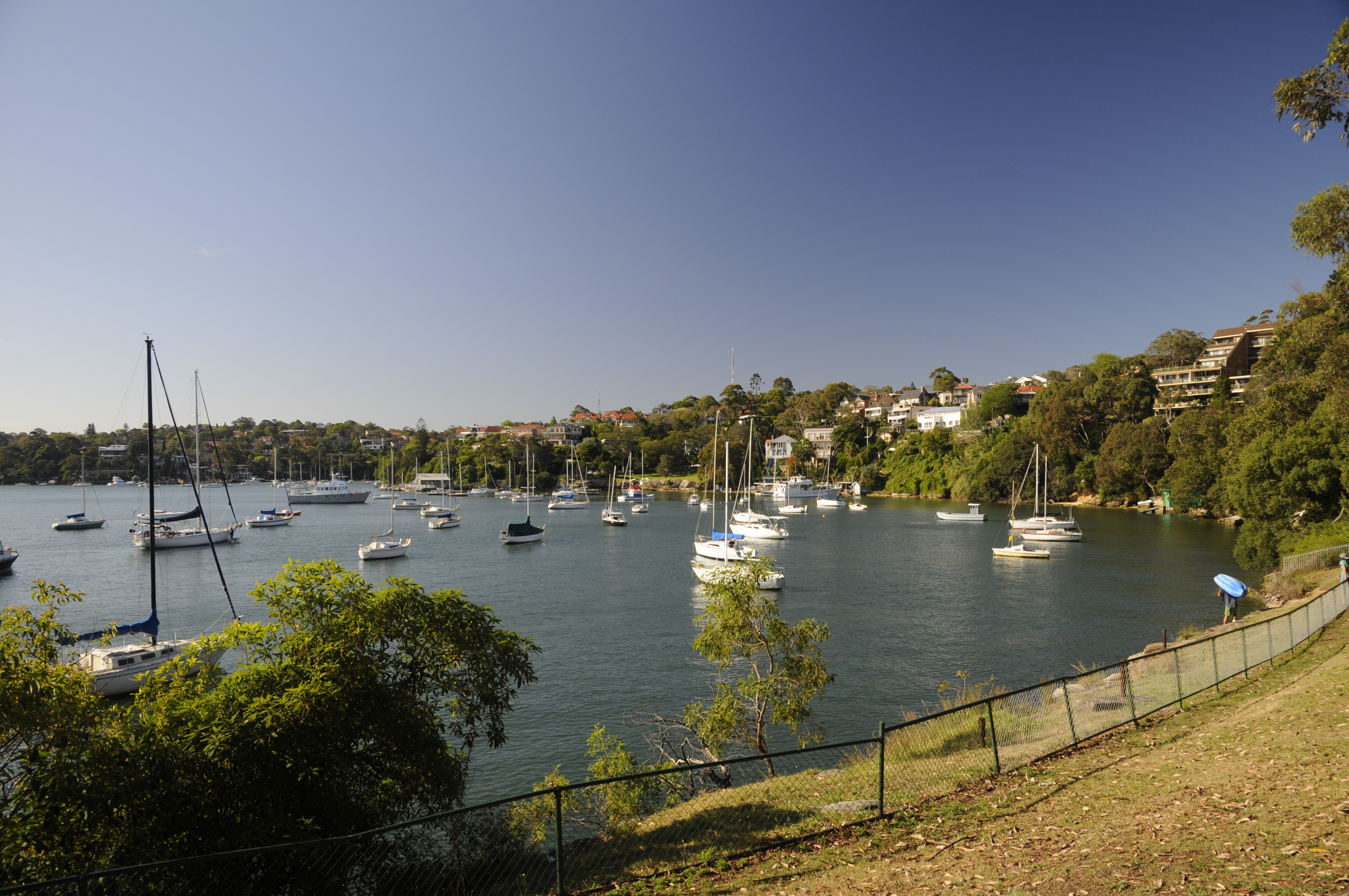
- View from Shell Park

- Interactive map of Greenwich
- Country: Australia
- State: New South Wales
- City: Sydney
- LGA: Municipality of Lane Cove
- Location: 7 km (4.3 mi) NW of Sydney CBD

Government
  - State electorate: Lane Cove
  - Federal division: Bennelong

Area
  - Total: 1.7 km^{2} (0.66 sq mi)
- Elevation: 56 m (184 ft)

Population
  - Total: 5,469 (SAL 2021)
- Postcode: 2065
Suburbs around Greenwich
| Lane Cove | Artarmon | St Leonards |
| Northwood Longueville | Greenwich | Wollstonecraft |
| Woolwich | Birchgrove | Waverton |

Greenwich is a suburb on the Lower North Shore of Sydney, New South Wales, Australia. Greenwich is located 7 kilometres (4 mi) north-west of the Sydney central business district, in the local government area of the Municipality of Lane Cove.

The suburb occupies a peninsula on the northern side of Sydney Harbour, at the opening of the Lane Cove River. The suburb features harbour views, a few pockets of bushland, shops, restaurants, cafes and a harbour swimming pool with shark net.

== History ==
The suburb's name is derived from its namesake Greenwich, by the banks of the River Thames in London. Parramatta River had been known as the 'Thames of the Antipodes' and other nearby suburbs were also named after Thames localities of Putney, Woolwich and Henley.

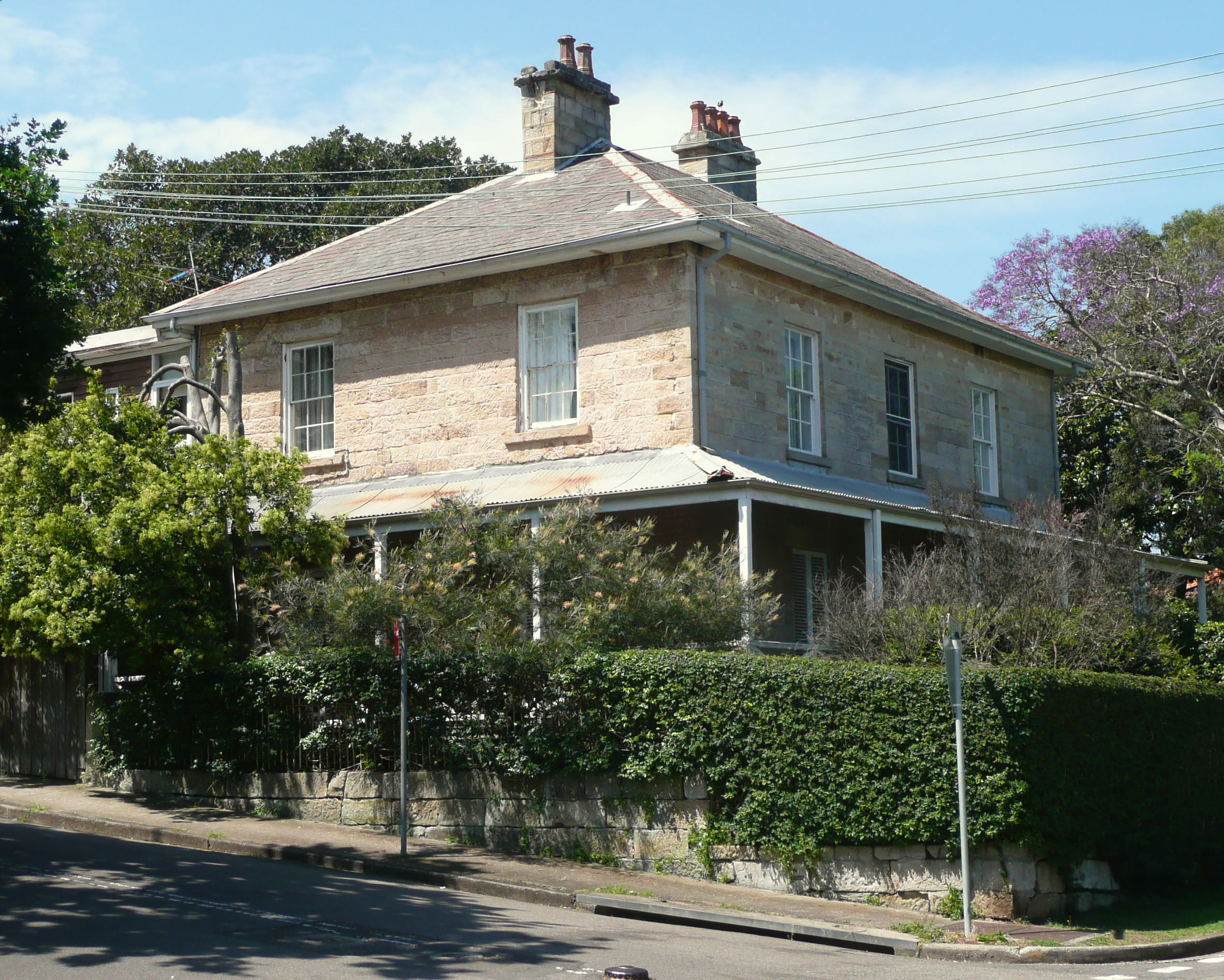
Greenwich House, George Street

The Cammeraygal clan of the Dharug-speaking people of the Eora Nation were the first inhabitants of the Greenwich area, and lived along the foreshores of the harbour, hunting in the hinterland and trading with other clans.

The first known occasion when a European went to the area was in 1788, when Lieutenant Henry Ball passed through the area while returning from a trip to the Middle Harbour area. Land grants began in 1794 and industries developed in the area during the 1830s.

Aboriginal people were still present in the 1820s, but disease and displacement had driven them out by the 1860s.

Early land grants were made to Samuel Lightfoot, a convict, in 1794, and William Gore, public servant, in 1813. Gore built a road from his farm at Artarmon to Gore Cove, which was the beginning of Greenwich Road.

In the 1830s George Green and his father Amaziah bought land in Greenwich, with access to the harbour, and along with others began a shipbuilding industry on the foreshore. When Green subdivided his land in 1840, the name 'Greenwich' was mentioned for the first time.

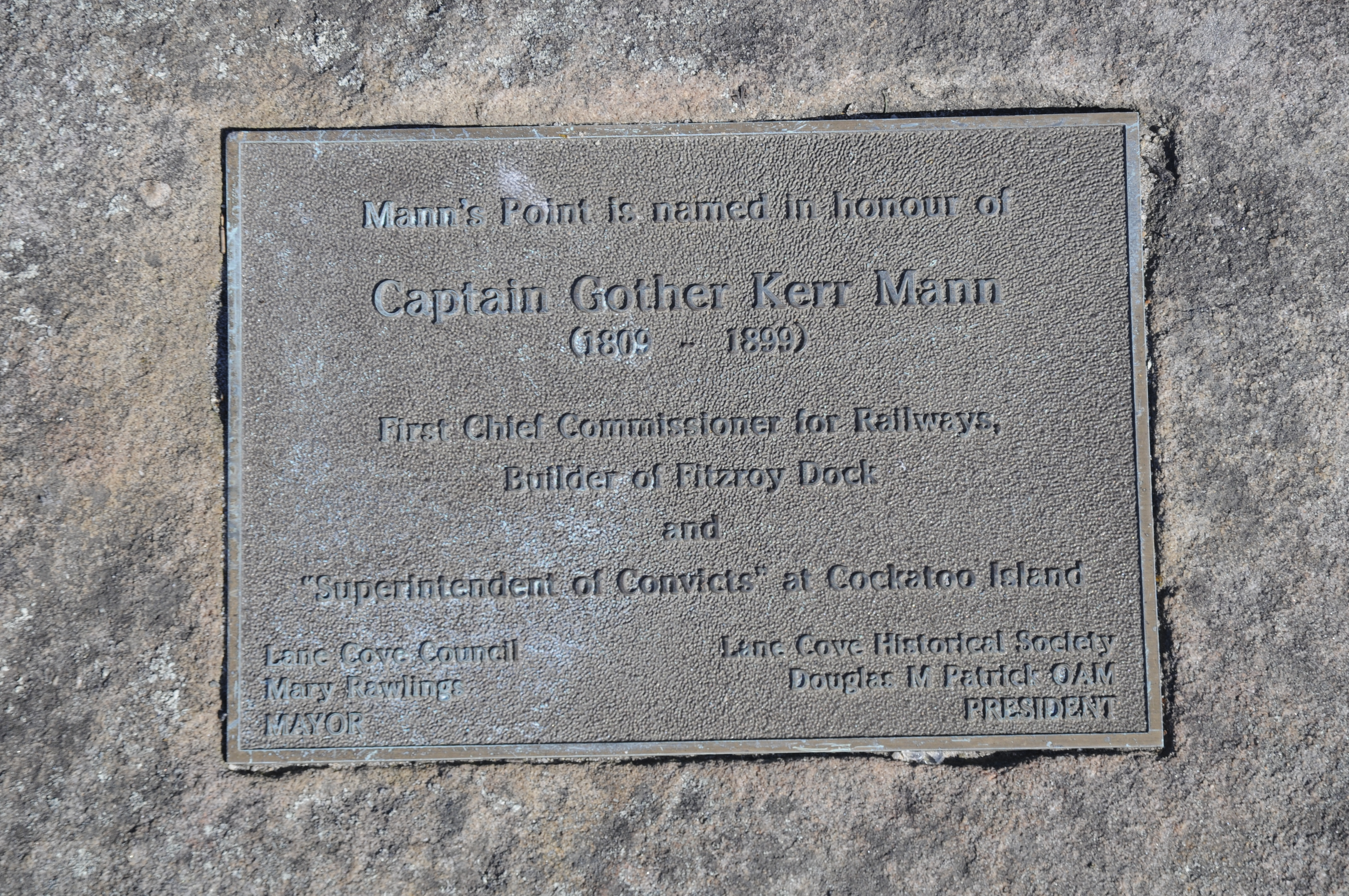
Plaque in honour of Captain Gother Kerr Mann

Greenwich House—a two-storey Georgian home made from sandstone blocks—was built on the 20-acre (8.1 ha) estate of George Green in 1836 and still stands on the corner of George and St Lawrence Streets. The house was eventually sold, by the mortgage holders, to Gother Kerr Mann in 1853, and remained in that family until 1949.

The eastern tip of Greenwich is called Manns Point, after Gother Kerr Mann (1809–1899). Mann was the first Chief Commissioner for Railways, the Superintendent of convicts at Cockatoo Island and the builder of Fitzroy Dock.

By the early 1880s Greenwich Point had a post office, general store, and school, with around 16 houses. Upper Greenwich took longer to develop, with most of the area still virgin bush. But with the improvement in north shore roads, and increasing subdivision in upper Greenwich, some grander houses were built near River Road, and new estates were subdivided as Greenwich became a commuter suburb.

Between the 1880s and the 1940s a number of successful dairies operated in Greenwich, run by the Anderson, Hogan, Mather and Clarke families. The milk from Anderson's was delivered by boat along the Lane Cove River and to the residents of Cockatoo Island. Hogan's dairy at Chisholm Street had 300 cows by the time it closed in 1928. Clarke's dairy was on the site of the current golf course.

Light industry was set up along the foreshores of Greenwich, including Shipbuilding, brickmaking, quarrying, and the Patent Asphaltum Company which refined bitumen and manufactured building materials. Shell opened a terminal at Gore Bay in 1901, importing and distributing petroleum products. It grew over time to include the sites of the Patent Asphaltum works, and several wharves, as well as the shale oil refining works of John Fell & Co. By the late 1930s, over 500 workers were employed at the Shell site. Today fuel products unloaded at Gore Bay are transferred by an underground pipe to the Clyde Refinery.

Greenwich was the northern portal of the first tunnel under Sydney Harbour. The tunnel was dug by the New South Wales Government Railways to Birchgrove to provide a reliable way to get electricity from the Pyrmont Power Station to the tram network on the north shore. Cables had previously been laid on the floor of the harbour, but damaged by ships dragging their anchors. The tunnel was commenced in 1913 and excavated by hand, completed in 1924. Part of the tunnel is through the silt at the bottom of the river, so required constant pumping until it was allowed to flood in 1930 and abandoned from 1969. The tunnel was excavated almost entirely from the Greenwich side, as the residents on Long Nose Point at Balmain (now Birchgrove) successfully objected to the noise of the compressor powering pneumatic drills. There were both the tunnel portal and a vertical shaft nearer the water used for excavation. The tunnel passes between the floor of the harbour and the Balmain coal mine further below the harbour. The tunnel is excavated entirely through Hawkesbury sandstone which lies below the silt and sediment which form the floor of the harbour. At its lowest point, it is 236 feet (72 m) below sea level.

== Heritage listings ==
Greenwich has a number of heritage-listed sites, including:

- 95 River Road: Pallister, Greenwich
- Greenwich Infants School
- Sydney Harbour railway electricity tunnel

== Education ==
Greenwich Public School is a local primary school with two separate campuses located 1.5 kilometres apart. It was opened in 1876 as a provisional school, after repeated petitions from residents, and became a public school in 1880, with a new building and site in Mitchell Street in 1881. In 1909 the school moved to the site of the current infants school in Greenwich Road, and the primary school moved to Kingslangley Road in 1950. The children of former Prime Minister John Howard, attended the school.

== Transport ==
Greenwich Point ferry wharf on the Parramatta River is served by Sydney Ferries Cockatoo Island ferry services between Circular Quay and Cockatoo Island. A second wharf on the Lane Cove River is served by peak-hour Captain Cook Cruises services. Busways bus route 265 from Lane Cove to North Sydney operates via Greenwich. There are also regular buses on the Pacific Highway. The closest train stations are at Wollstonecraft and St Leonards.

== Sport and recreation ==
The Greenwich Village Games are held every four years featuring numerous sports and competitions held mainly at Bob Campbell Oval (Gore Creek Oval) and Lane Cove Aquatic Centre. Greenwich Sports Club, which was founded in 1936, organises football (soccer) for men, women and children and netball for girls. There are two sailing clubs as well. One is situated at the mouth of the Lane Cove River and the other off Greenwich Point.

A Scout Hall is located in the eastern side of Greenwich, and is the usual meeting place for the Greenwich/Wollstonecraft Scout group, as well as for other local organisations.

== Demographics ==
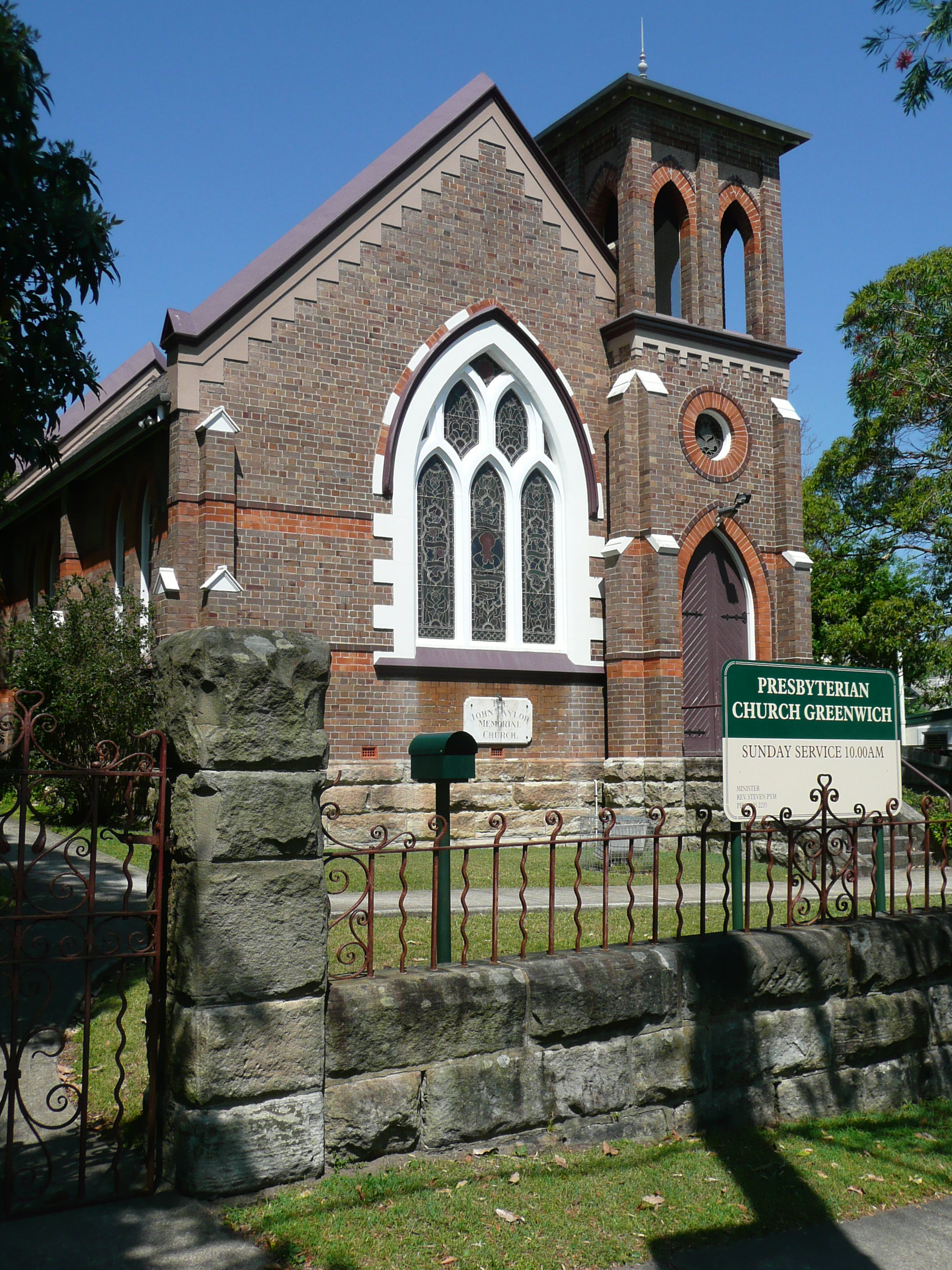
John Taylor Memorial Church (Presbyterian Church),

At the 2021 census, there were 5,469 residents in Greenwich. 62.7% of people were born in Australia. The next most common countries of birth were England 5.6%, China 2.9%, India 2.3% and New Zealand 2.2%. 77.2% of people spoke only English at home. Other languages spoken at home included Mandarin 3.4% and Cantonese 1.8%. The top responses for religious affiliation were No Religion 43.5%, Catholic 20.4% and Anglican 14.0%.

Greenwich's population has a median weekly household income of $2,946, compared with $1,746 in Australia. The most common types of occupation for employed persons were Professionals 46.1%, Managers 20.7%, Clerical and Administrative Workers 11.1%, Community and Personal Service Workers 6.2%, and Sales Workers 6.0%, . Of all households, 67.8% were family households, 27.7% were single person households and 4.5% were group households.

== Religion ==
The Catholic Church maintains Mary Help of Christians Chapel and the adjacent Clancy Terrace retirement village, and there are Anglican, Presbyterian and LDS Churches.

== Politics ==
For elections to the Australian House of Representatives, Greenwich is part of the Division of Bennelong since 2024. Prior to that, Greenwich fell within the now-abolished Division of North Sydney, last represented by independent Kylea Tink, who defeated Trent Zimmerman, a member of the Liberal Party in the 2022 Australian federal election. The seat was held by Joe Hockey from 1996 federal election until 2015.

For NSW state elections, Greenwich is in the electorate of Lane Cove, presently held by Anthony Roberts, a member of the Liberal Party, who has held the seat since 2003.

== Notable people ==
- Norman Hetherington (1921 – 2010), artist, cartoonist, teacher, and puppet designer (Mr Squiggle)
- Antonia Kidman, journalist and sister of actress Nicole Kidman
- Andrew Olle (1947 – 1995), ABC radio and television presenter
- Ruth Park (1917 – 2010), author

== Gallery ==
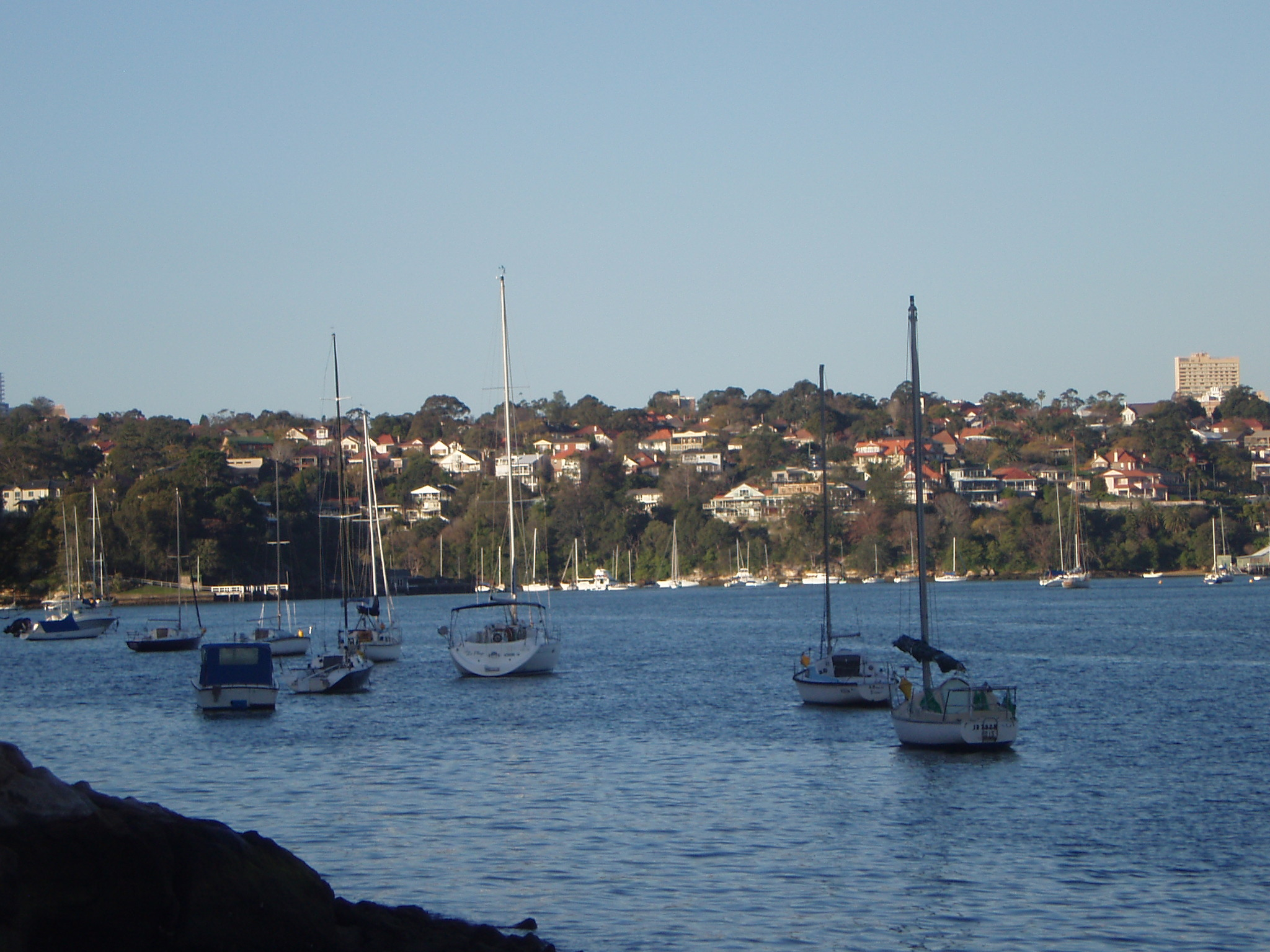
Greenwich, view from Longueville Wharf

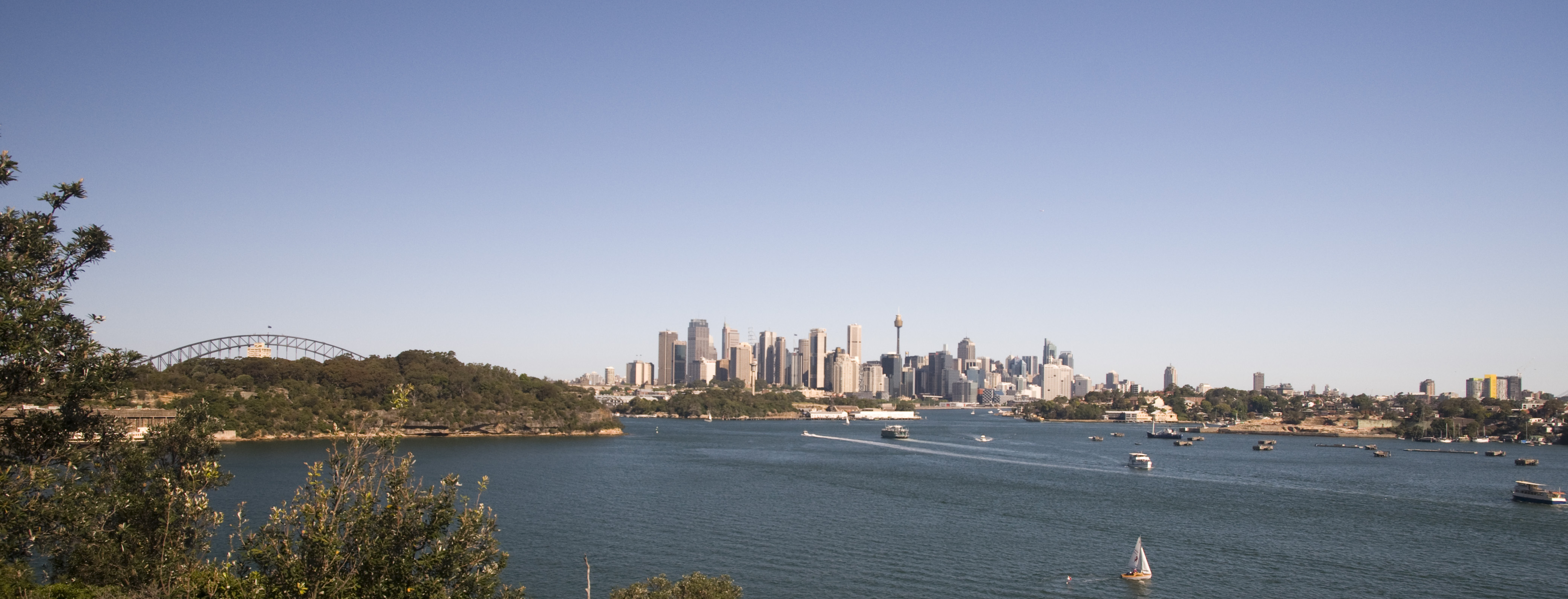
View of Sydney from Manns Point Park

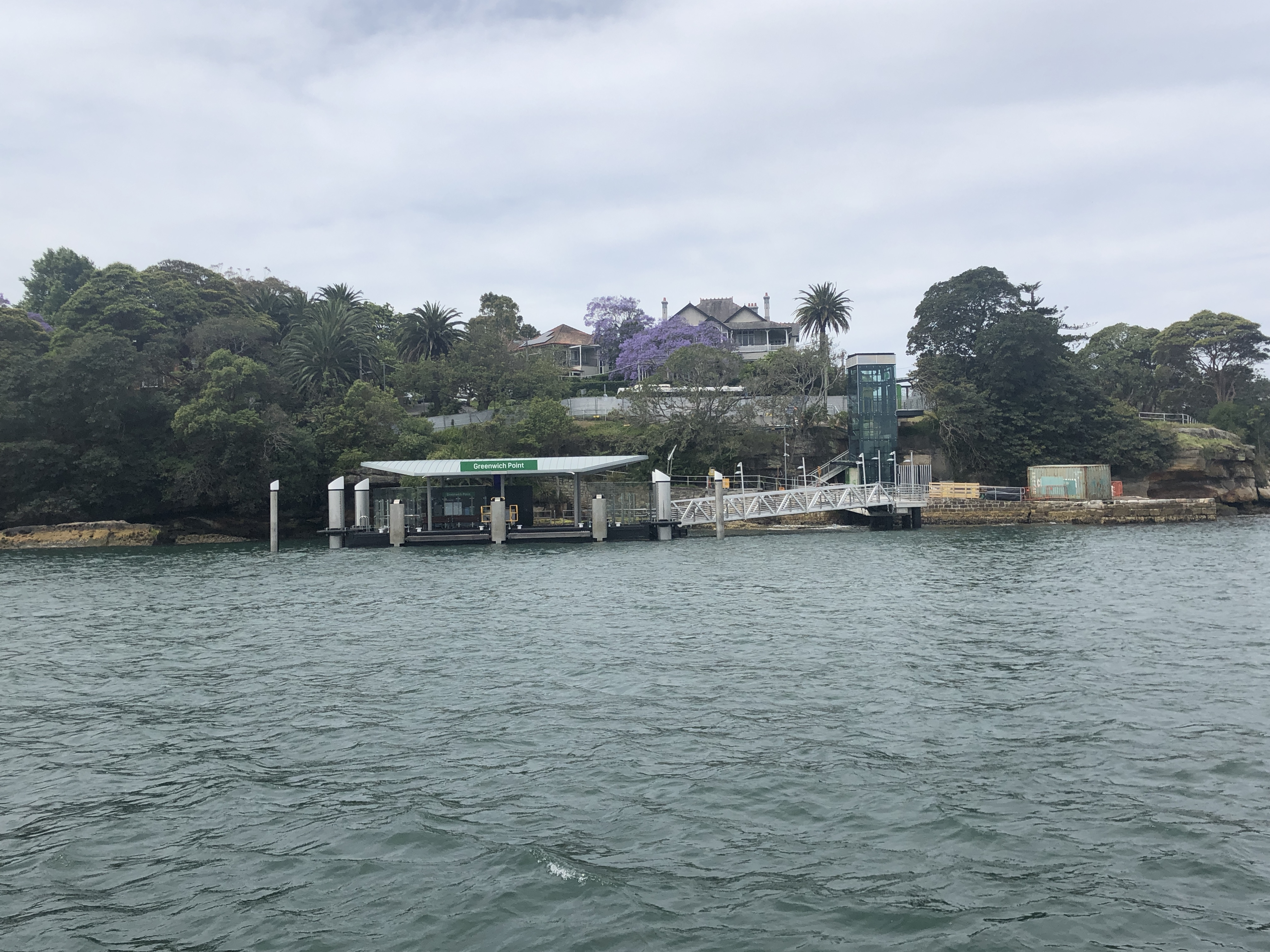
Greenwich Point ferry wharf

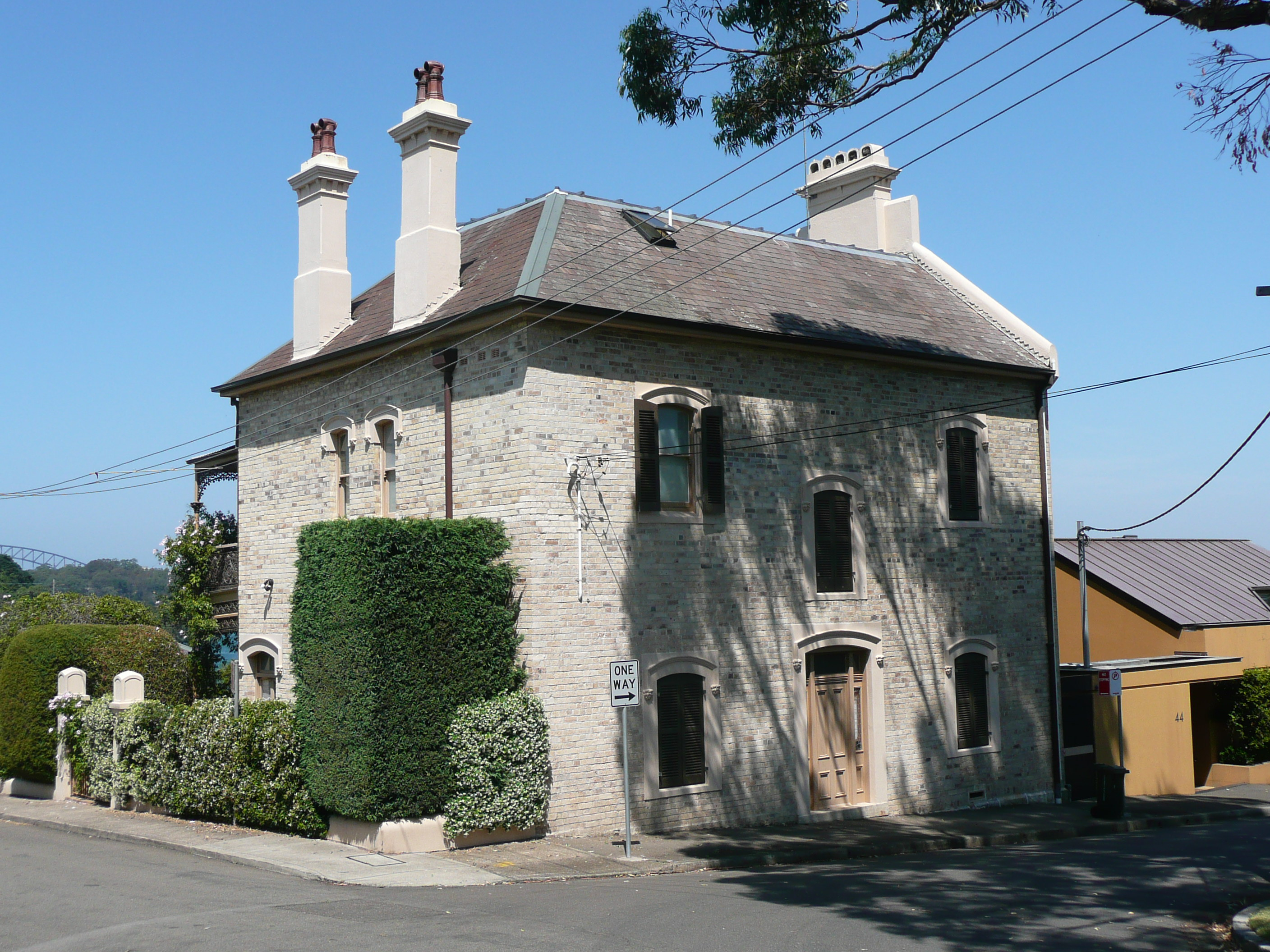
Home, Lower Serpentine Road

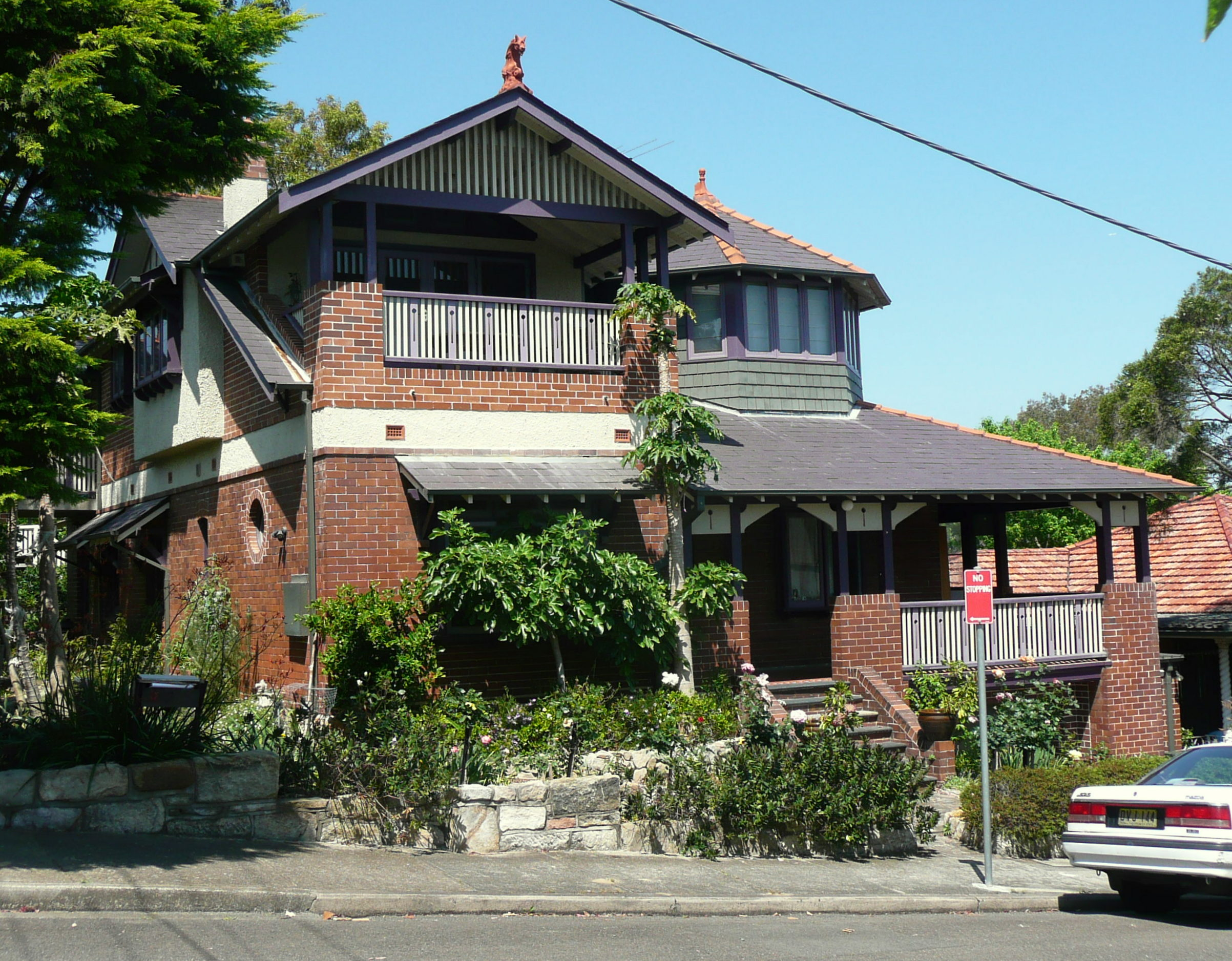
Home in Federation Bungalow style, Albert Street
