= Balmain ferry wharf =

Ferry wharf in Sydney, Australia

Balmain
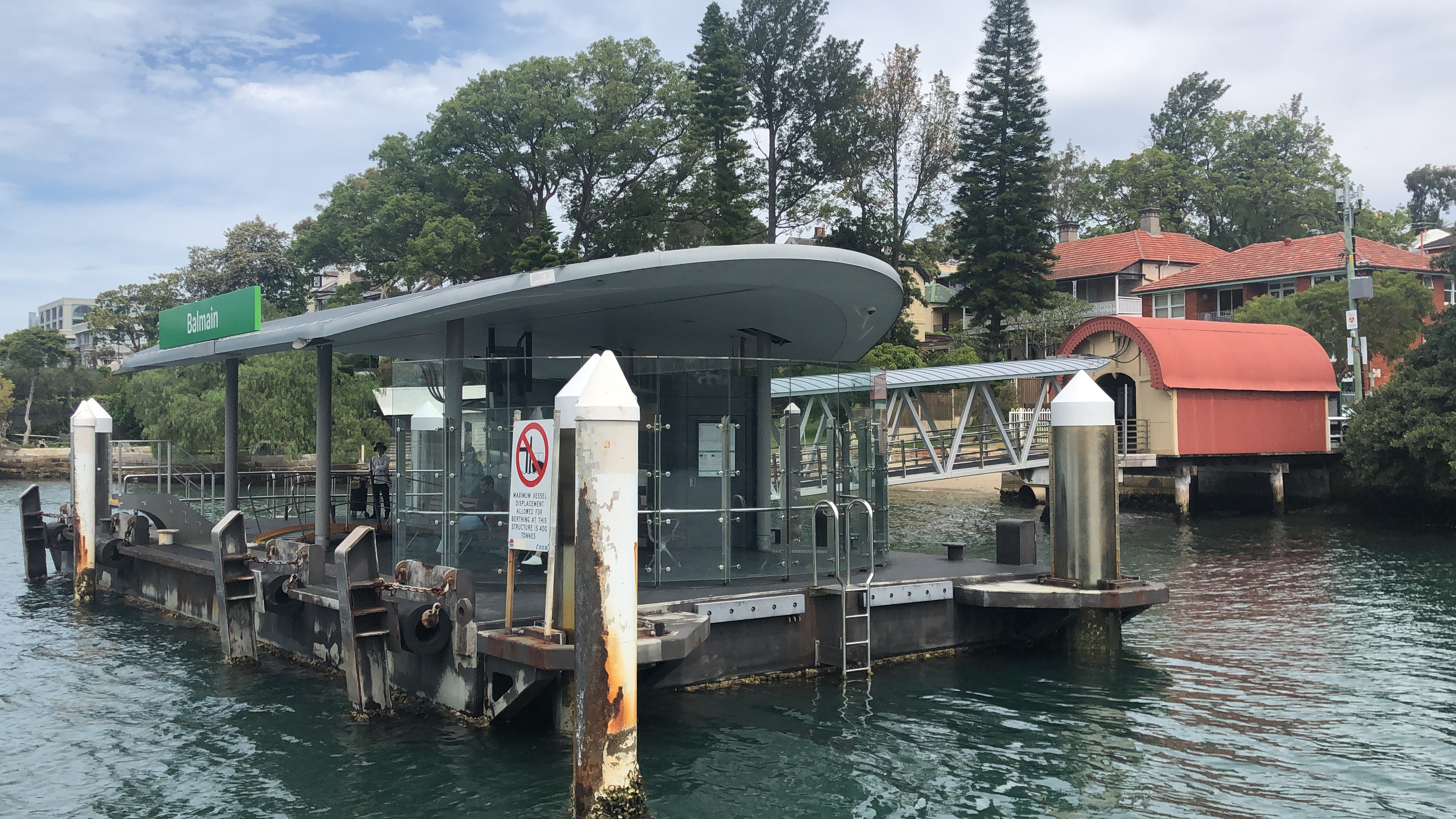
- Wharf in November 2024 with original waiting shed in the background

General information
- Location: Thames Street, Balmain, New South Wales; Australia
- Coordinates: 33°51′17.13″S 151°11′9.99″E
- Owner: Transport for NSW
- Operator: Transdev Sydney Ferries
- Platforms: 1

Construction
- Accessible: Yes

Other information
- Status: Unstaffed

History
- Rebuilt: February 2013
- Former names: Thames Street

Services
Preceding wharf	Sydney Ferries	Following wharf
McMahons Point towards Circular Quay	F3 Parramatta Peak hours only	Cockatoo Island towards Parramatta
Circular Quay Terminus	F8 Cockatoo Island	Birchgrove towards Cockatoo Island
Location

Balmain ferry wharf is located on Sydney Harbour in the Sydney suburb of Balmain. It is served by Sydney Ferries Cockatoo Island services operating between Circular Quay and Cockatoo Island, with some peak Parramatta River services operating to Chiswick.

It was named Thames Street until renamed in 1996. A community library has been established in the old waiting room.

In September 2012, the wharf closed for a rebuild by Hansen Yuncken. The existing wharf was demolished and a new one opened in February 2013.

To the east of the wharf, lies Transdev Sydney Ferries' Balmain depot. To the west lay the yard of Mort's Dock & Engineering Company.

== Services ==
Platform	Line	Stopping pattern	Notes
1	Parramatta River ferry service	Morning services to Circular Quay Evening services to Chiswick	
1	Cockatoo Island ferry service	Services to Circular Quay & Cockatoo Island	
