= Gother Kerr Mann =

New South Wales engineer

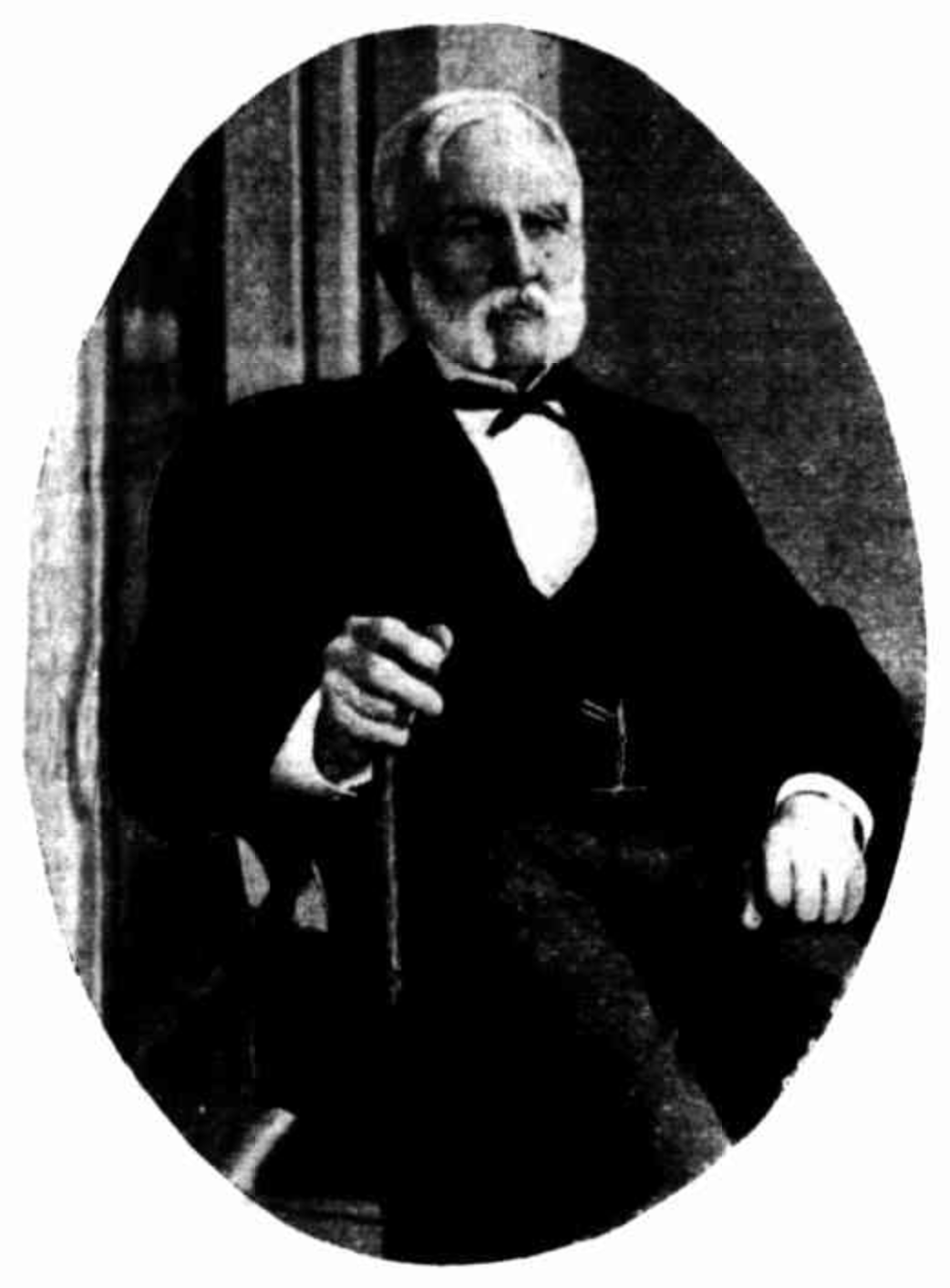
- Gother Kerr Mann, 1898
- Born: 20 February 1809; Queenstown, Ireland
- Died: 1 January 1899 (aged 89); Greenwich, St Leonards, New South Wales, Australia
- Burial place: St. Thomas Rest Park, Crows Nest, North Sydney Council, New South Wales
- Spouse: Mary Joanna Hely
- Children: 12
- Parent(s): Cornelius Mann and Sarah Fyers
- Military career
- Relatives: Gother Mann
- Allegiance: United Kingdom
- Branch: Bombay Army, East India Company
- Service years: 1828–1838
- Rank: Lieutenant
- Service number: 296
- Unit: Bombay Horse Artillery

Captain Gother Kerr Mann (20 February 1809 – 1 January 1899), often referred to as Captain Mann, was a consulting engineer in New South Wales.

== History ==
Mann was born in Ireland on 20 February 1809, a son of General Cornelius Mann R.E.

Having passed cadetship at Addiscombe Military Seminary, 1825–1827, Mann advanced to 2nd lieutenant from 15 June 1827, lieutenant from 24 July 1828, Orderly officer at Addiscombe, 1831–1832, to officer 296 of the Bombay Horse Artillery in India, which saw considerable action. He left Bombay, India, onboard HEICS Tigris for Australia in 1836, settling in Sydney, where he helped found the Volunteer Artillery Corps. He was a member of Archibald Boyd's exploration party, active in the Clarence area around 1838.

In early January 1838 he married Mary Hely, eldest daughter of the late Frederick Augustus Hely (1794–1836), at St James' Church, Sydney. From Hely, he inherited 438 acres (177 ha) on Narara Creek and 738 acres (299 ha) on Wyong Creek, which may be the properties named Cungelbung and Buccarumbi. He operated a sawmill at Wyoming, New South Wales with James Hooke, another son-in-law of Hely, and built a cottage nearby.

He was appointed magistrate at Gosford in 1850.

In July 1855 he was appointed the first Railways Commissioner for New South Wales.

He supervised the construction of Fitzroy Dry Dock at Cockatoo Island and designed the wharf layout at Circular Quay. On 1 August 1859 he was appointed Superintendent of the Penal Establishment and Engineer-in-Chief of the dock establishment at Cockatoo Island.

He retired from government service in 1870 and was appointed captain of the Volunteer Engineering Corps.

== Recognition ==
Mann Street, Gosford, was name for him, as was the Mann River, although the latter has been disputed.

The eastern tip of Greenwich, where their home "Greenwich House" was situated, is called Manns Point.

== Personal ==
Mann married Mary Johanna Hely of Wyoming, New South Wales, on 3 January 1838 and had 12 children.

In 1853 he purchased "Greenwich House" (Note: Greenwich House was built for shipbuilder George Green (1809 – 30 Aug 1872), who purchased much land along the Lane Cove River.) at Greenwich Point, Sydney, where he lived the rest of his life.
