= Marist Sisters' College, Woolwich =

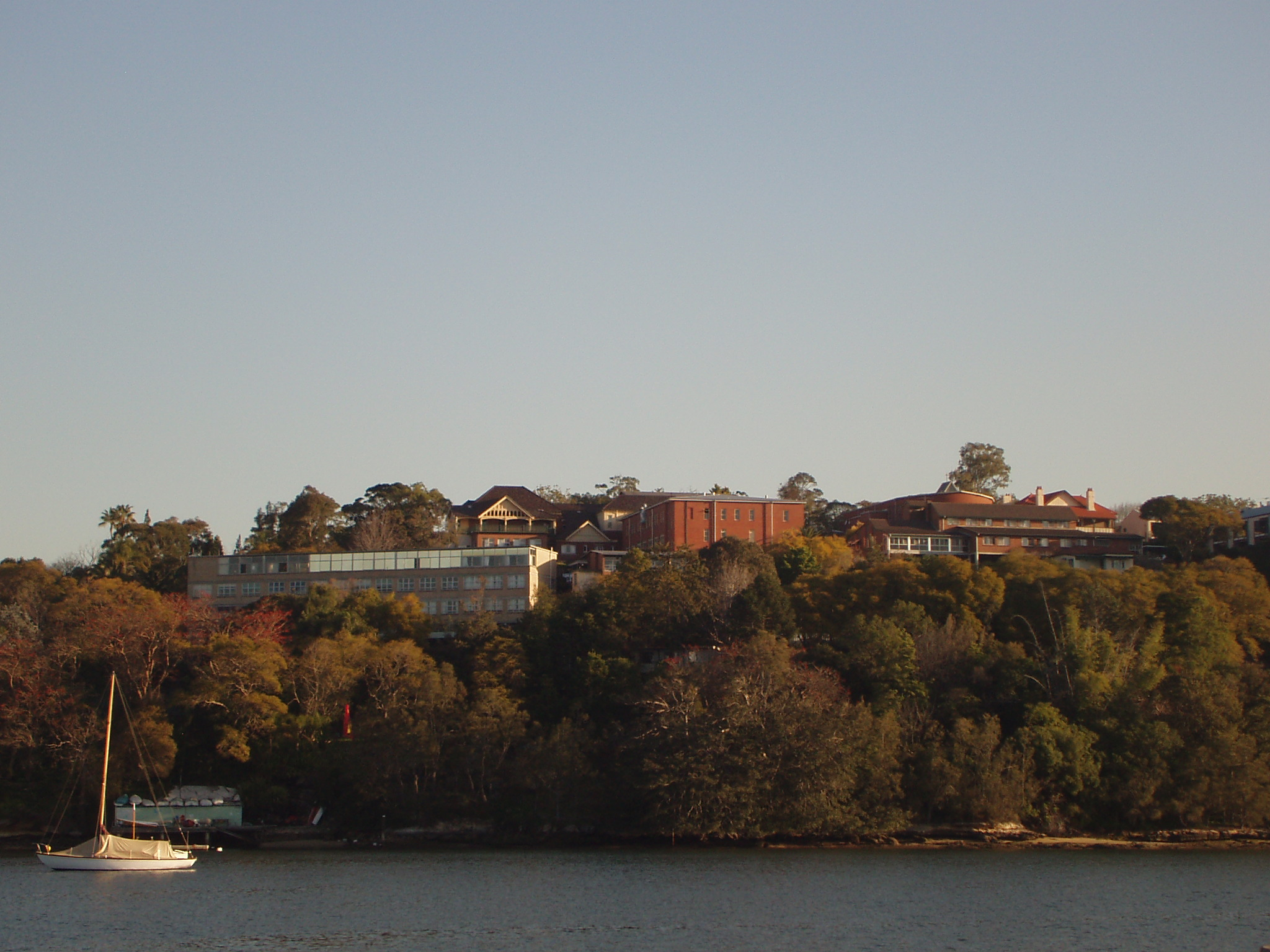
- The College, pictured in 2006 from the Longueville wharf

Location
- 66A Woolwich Road; Woolwich, Sydney, New South Wales, 2110; Australia; 33°50′23″S 151°10′02″E

Information
- Type: Independent single-sex secondary day school
- Motto: Latin: Virtus Super Omnia (Goodness above all)
- Religious affiliation: Marist Sisters
- Denomination: Catholicism
- Established: 1908; 118 years ago
- Founder: Fr. Huault
- Sister school: Marist College Eastwood
- Educational authority: New South Wales Education Standards Authority
- Oversight: Sydney Catholic Schools
- Principal: Ms Rachel Sampson
- Staff: 106
- Years: 7–12
- Gender: Girls
- Enrolment: 978 (2022)
- Colours: Blue and white
- Affiliations: Association of Marist Schools of Australia; Alliance of Girls' Schools Australasia
- Website: mscwoolwich.syd.catholic.edu.au

Marist Sisters' College, Woolwich is an independent Catholic single-sex secondary day school for girls, in Woolwich, a Lower North Shore suburb of Sydney, New South Wales, Australia. It was established in 1908 by the Marist Sisters and has a non-selective enrolment policy which caters for approximately 1,000 students from Year 7 to Year 12.

== House system ==
There are six houses, all of which are named after famous Marists:

- Chanel – Red – named after St Peter Chanel
- Chavoin – Blue – named after Jeanne-Marie Chavoin
- Colin – White – named after Jean Claude Colin
- Jaricot – Magenta – named after Pauline Jaricot
- Marcellin – Green – named after St Marcellin Champagnat
- Perroton – Yellow – named after Françoise Perroton

== Curriculum ==
The curriculum at Marist Sisters' College is broken up into Religious Education and 8 Key Learning Areas (KLAs). The Key Learning Areas are: English, Mathematics, Science, HSIE (Human Society and its Environment), Creative Arts, Languages, TAS (Technical and Applied Science) and PDHPE (Personal Development, Health and Physical Education). Marist Sisters' College also offers courses in VET (Vocational Education Training).

Outlined below are the specific courses for the Junior and Senior years. Syllabi for all these courses can be found at the Board of Studies website.

Junior Courses – Year 7–10

Religious Education, Computing Studies, Commerce, Dance, Design and Technology, Digital Media, Drama, English, Food Technology, Geography, History, Languages (French and Italian), Mathematics, Music, PD/H/PE, Science, Sport, Textiles and Design, Visual Arts.

Senior Courses – Years 11–12

Religious Education, Ancient History, Biology, Business Services, Business Studies, Chemistry, Community and Family Studies, Dance, Design and Technology, Drama, Earth and Environmental Science, Economics, English, Entertainment, Food Technology, Geography, Information Processing and Technology, Languages, Legal Studies, Life Management, General Maths, Mathematics, Music, Modern History, PDHPE, Physics, Senior Science, Software Design and Development, Studies of Religion (1 and 2 units), Textiles and Design, Visual Arts, Office Skills.

== Notable alumnae ==
- Courtney Miller-Actress (Plays Bella Nixon in Home and Away)

== See also ==
- List of Catholic schools in New South Wales
- Catholic education in Australia
