= Cockatoo Island ferry service =

Commuter ferry service in Sydney, Australia

F8 Cockatoo Island

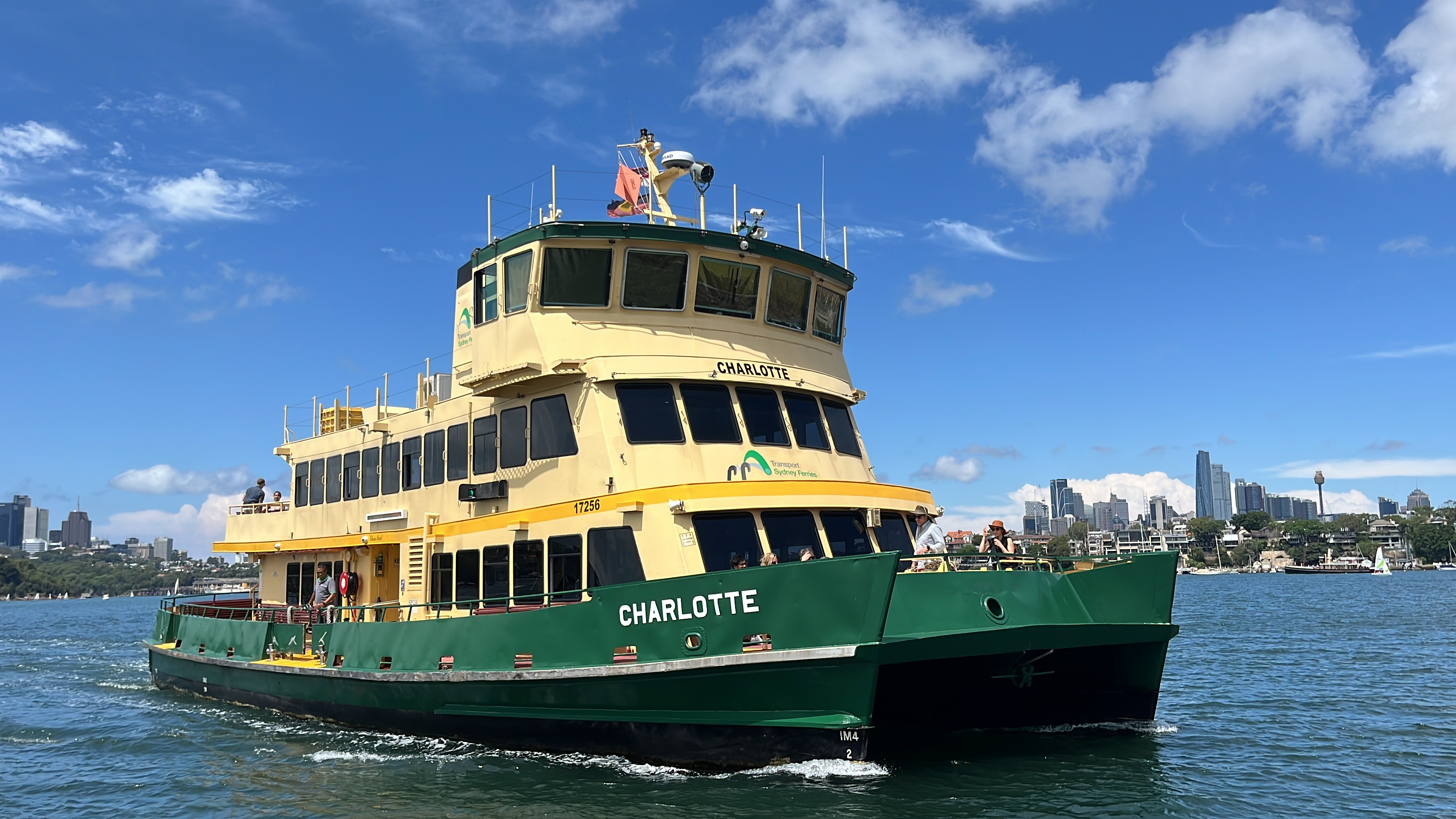
- Charlotte arriving into Cockatoo Island in February 2025
- Waterway: Sydney Harbour, Parramatta River
- Owner: Transport for NSW
- Operator: Transdev Sydney Ferries
- Website: Transport for NSW

The Cockatoo Island ferry service, officially known as F8 Cockatoo Island, is a commuter ferry service in Sydney, Australia. Part of the Sydney Ferries network, it is operated by Transdev Sydney Ferries and services the Balmain, Greenwich, Woolwich and Cockatoo Island areas of Sydney Harbour.

== History ==
Prior to 2007, Sydney Ferries and its predecessors operated a ferry service from Circular Quay to Woolwich calling at Balmain East, Balmain, Birchgrove and Greenwich Point with limited services calling at Milsons Point and McMahons Point. Cockatoo Island had been served by direct ferries to and from Circular Quay at shift changeover time at Cockatoo Island Dockyard until the latter closed in 1992.

In April 2007, Sydney Ferries began operating limited services to Cockatoo Island after the island reopened for tourists. Services from Circular Quay served Cockatoo Island after leaving Greenwich Point and then proceeded to Woolwich where they terminated. By December 2010, the calling pattern had been altered with ferries from Greenwich Point proceeding to Woolwich and then to Cockatoo Island to terminate.

When Sydney Ferries introduced route codes in October 2013, the Cockatoo island services were grouped with the Parramatta River ferry services as the F3. On 26 November 2017, the Cockatoo Island service was separated from the Parramatta River service and numbered F8.

The service is usually operated by First Fleet-class ferries.

== Wharves ==
Name	Waterway	Suburbs served	Connections	Photo of wharf
Circular Quay	Sydney Cove	Sydney CBD; The Rocks	Manly ferry service Taronga Zoo ferry service Parramatta River ferry service Pyrmont Bay ferry service Neutral Bay ferry service Mosman Bay ferry service Double Bay ferry service Watsons Bay ferry service	
Balmain	Mort Bay	Balmain	(morning peak services to Circular quay) (evening peak services to Chiswick)	
Birchgrove	Parramatta River	Birchgrove	none	Birchgrove Wharf
Greenwich Point	Parramatta River	Greenwich	none	Greenwich Point Wharf
Woolwich	Parramatta River	Woolwich	none	Woolwich Wharf
Cockatoo Island	Parramatta River	Cockatoo Island	Parramatta River ferry service	Cockatoo Island Wharf

== Patronage ==
The following table shows the patronage of Sydney Ferries network for the year 2025.

2025-26 Sydney Ferries annual patronage by line (Note: Figures based on Opal tap on and tap off data)
Manly ferry service	4,532,938	View source data.
Taronga Zoo ferry service	1,545,805	View source data.
Parramatta River ferry service	2,429,310	View source data.
Pyrmont Bay ferry service	2,779,319	View source data.
Neutral Bay ferry service	562,998	View source data.
Mosman Bay ferry service	709,762	View source data.
Double Bay ferry service	273,741	View source data.
Cockatoo Island ferry service	535,934	View source data.
Watsons Bay ferry service	1,873,854	View source data.
Blackwattle Bay ferry service	17,970	
