= Woolwich, New South Wales =

Woolwich
- Suburb
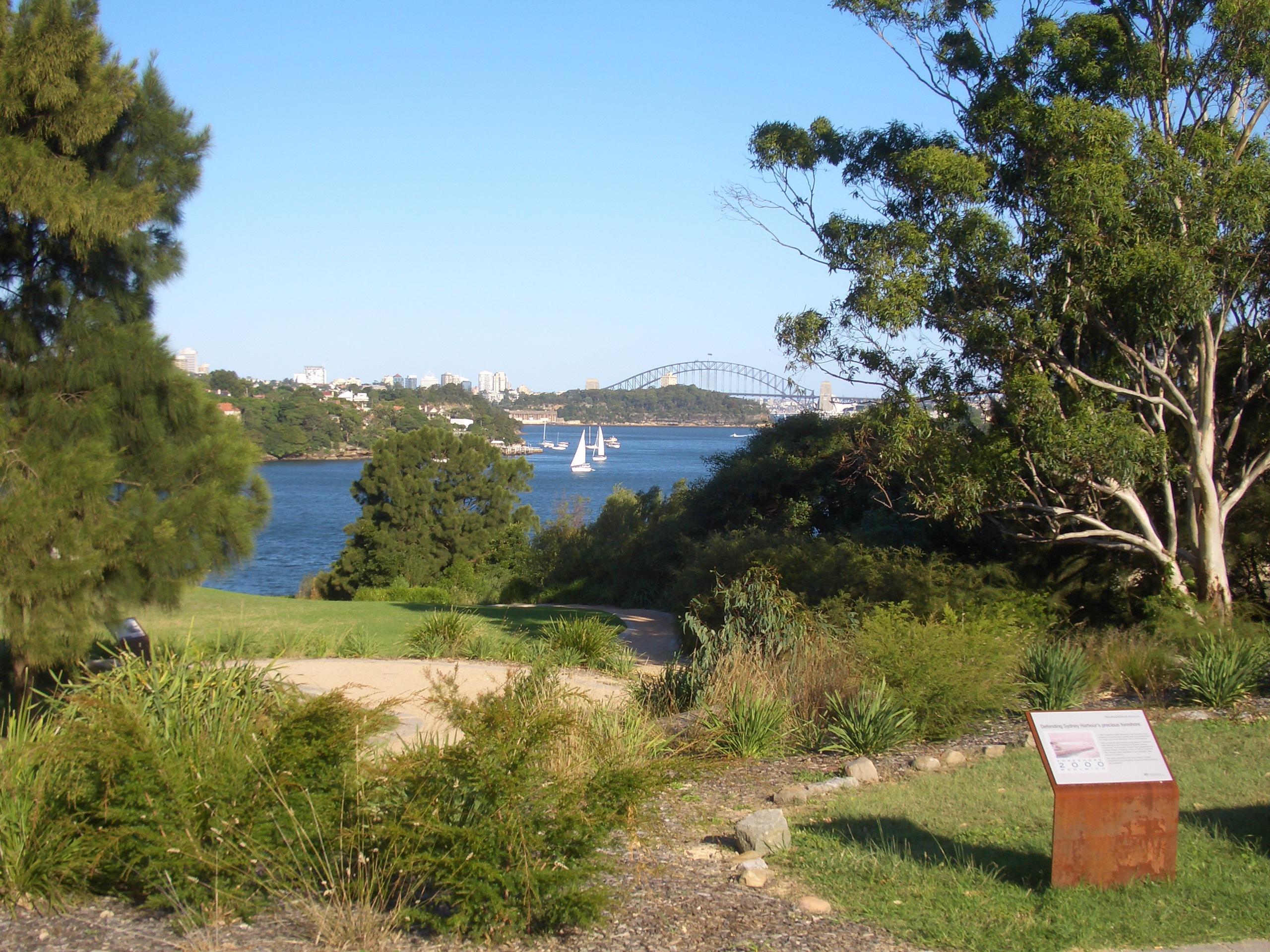
- Woolwich Lookout

- Interactive map of Woolwich
- Country: Australia
- State: New South Wales
- City: Sydney
- LGA: Municipality of Hunter's Hill
- Location: 11 km (6.8 mi) west of Sydney CBD

Government
  - State electorate: Lane Cove
  - Federal division: Bennelong

Population
  - Total: 833 (2021 census)
- Postcode: 2110
Suburbs around Woolwich
Longueville	Greenwich	Northwood
Hunters Hill	Woolwich	Greenwich
Drummoyne	Cockatoo Island	Birchgrove

Woolwich is a suburb in Northern Sydney, in the state of New South Wales, Australia. Woolwich is located 11 kilometres (6.8 mi) north-west of the Sydney central business district, in the local government area of the Municipality of Hunter's Hill. Woolwich sits on the peninsula between the Lane Cove River and the Parramatta River, jutting out from Hunters Hill.

== History ==
The suburb's name is derived from its namesake Woolwich, by the banks of the Thames in London. Parramatta River had been known as the 'Thames of the Antipodes' and other nearby suburbs were also named after Thames localities of Greenwich, Putney and Henley.

The area's Aboriginal name is 'Mookaboola' or 'Moocooboola', which means meeting of waters. An early settler was John Clarke, who bought land here in 1834 and is responsible for naming Clarke's Point. Samuel Onion was another early land owner with an ironmongery business and he gave the suburb its first name 'Onion Point' in 1835.

The world's first, union-led green ban was placed on the suburb. Jack Mundey and his followers in the Builder's Labourers Federation did not support the destruction of local habitat. They eventually won their battle and 'Kelly's Bush' remains today.

61 properties in Woolwich are listed on the NSW State Heritage Register, including the Woolwich Pier Hotel and the Woolwich Wharf. There are also notable heritage items of local significance dotted across the peninsula, including St John’s Anglican Church built in 1908. It has a simple gabled form from the Victorian Gothic revival style. The church became Hunter’s Hill Theatre in more recent years and was sold in 2012 to become a residential house. More recently, the Church underwent a significant renovation by Arc Architects and Interior Architecture by Michiru Higginbotham completed in 2020.

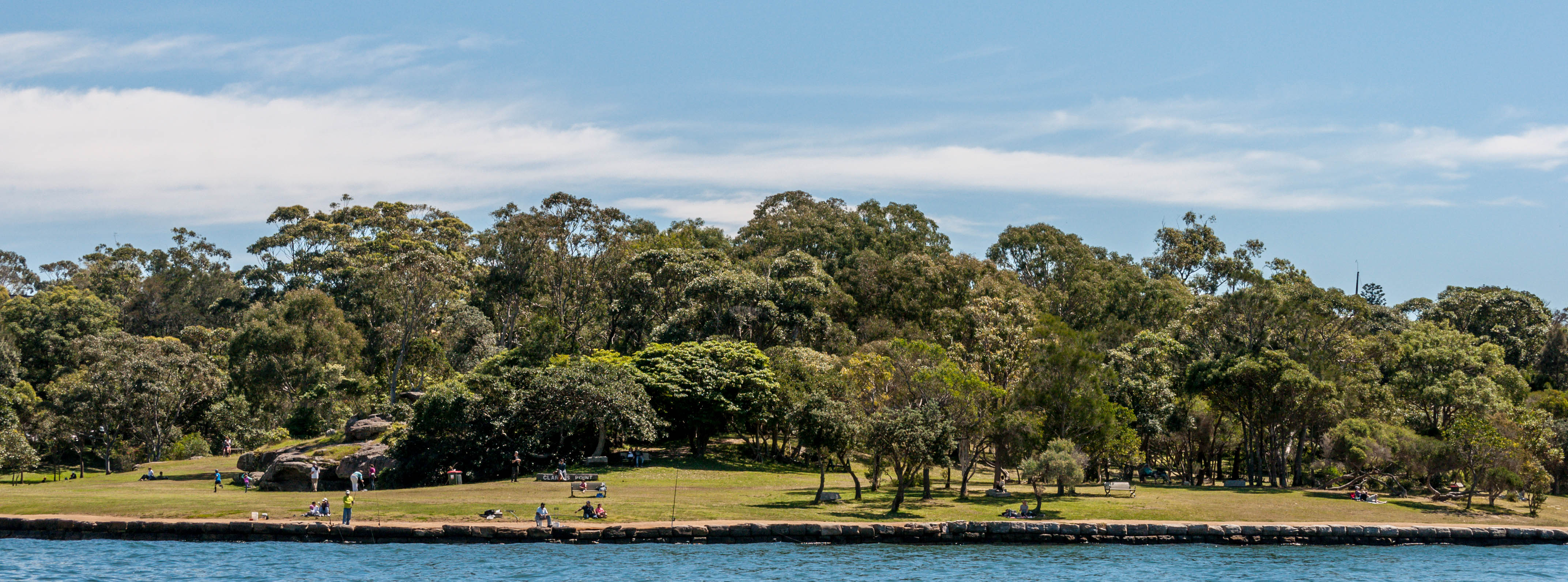
Clarks Point Reserve, Woolwich, New South Wales

== Population ==
=== Demographics ===
In the 2021 census of Population and Housing, the population of Woolwich stood at 833 people, 52.5% female and 47.5% male, and with a median age of 52 years. 70.9% of people were born in Australia and 80.6% of people only spoke English at home. The most common responses for religion were Catholic 31.9%, No Religion 27.5% and Anglican 17.8%.

Woolwich's median weekly household income was $2,931, compared with $1,746 in Australia. According to the Australian Taxation Office statistics for the financial year of 2016–2017, the postcode of 2110 (Hunters Hill & Woolwich) had an average taxable income of $156,069 making it the 10th wealthiest suburb in Australia. The most common response for occupations was Professionals with 40.7% of all responses. 68.6% of the suburb's occupied private dwellings were family households.

== Politics ==
Woolwich has been part of the federal Division of Bennelong since 2024. This seat was won by Jerome Laxale of the Australian Labor Party at the 2025 federal election. Prior to that, Woolwich was in the federal electoral division of North Sydney. The former Treasurer of Australia Joe Hockey, held this seat from the 1996 federal election to 2015.

For NSW state elections, Woolwich is in the Electoral district of Lane Cove. As of 2023 this seat is held by Liberal MP Anthony Roberts.

== Gallery ==
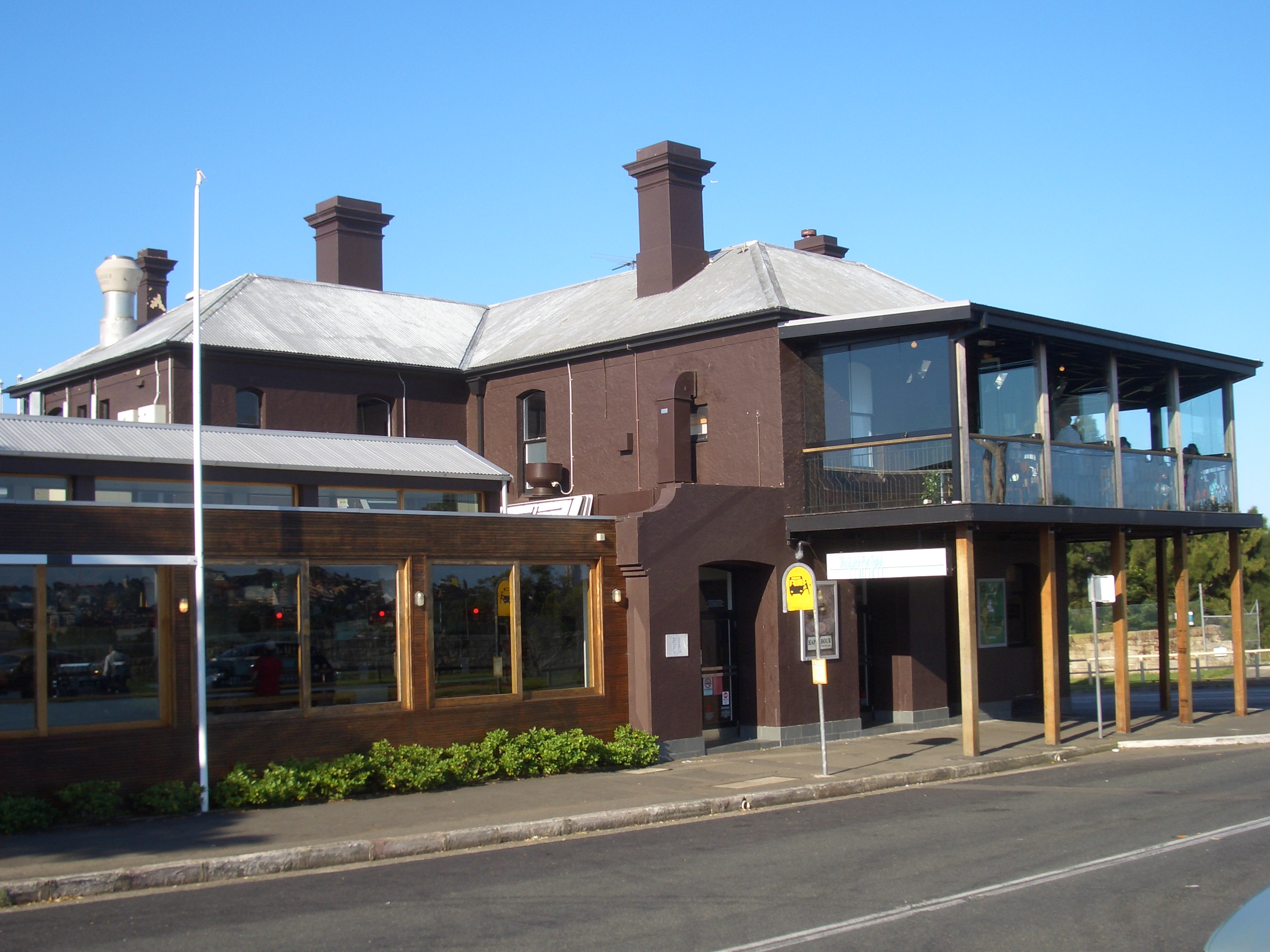
Woolwich Pier Hotel

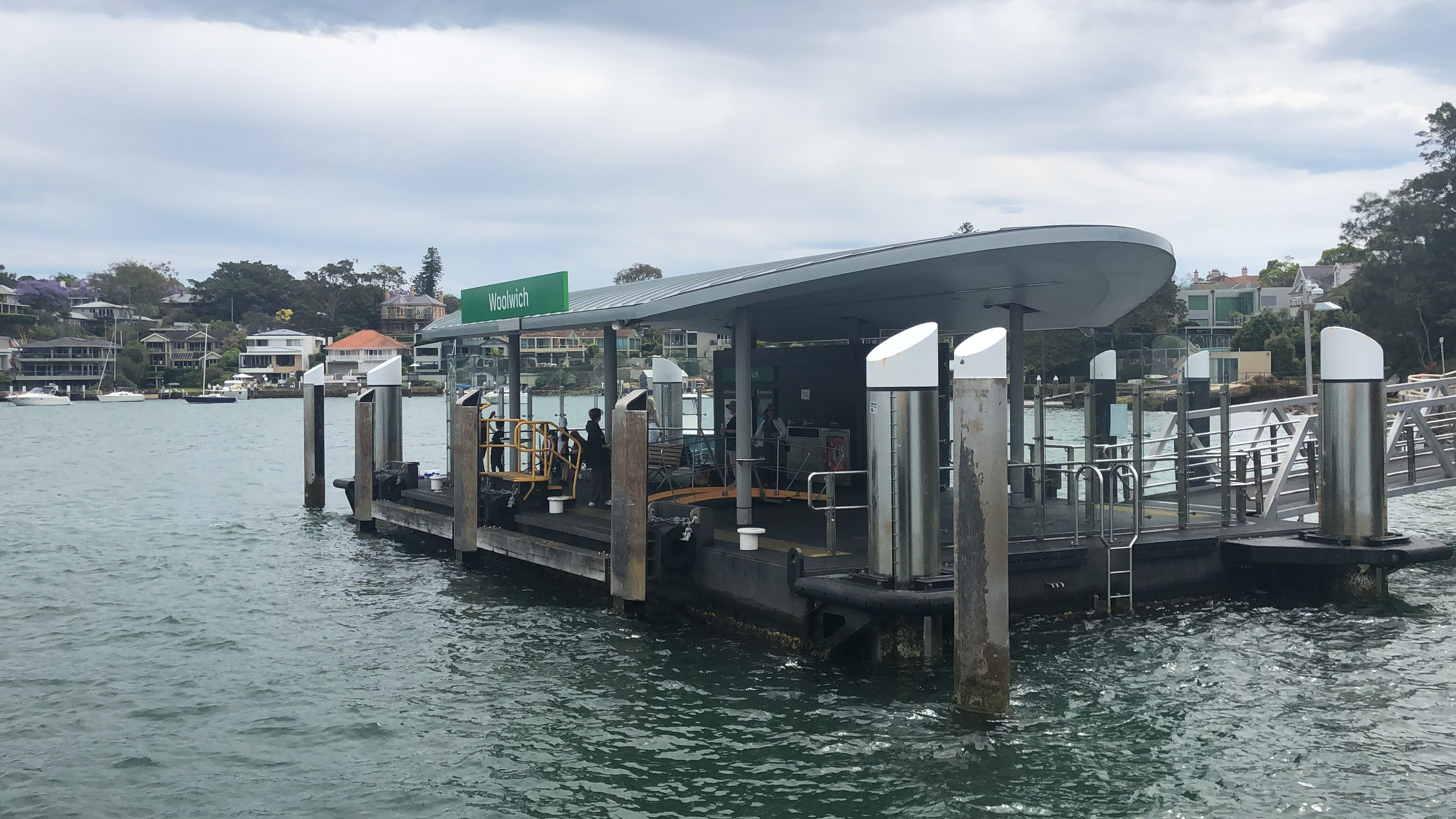
Woolwich ferry wharf provides access to the Cockatoo Island ferry services which run services between Circular Quay and Cockatoo Island.

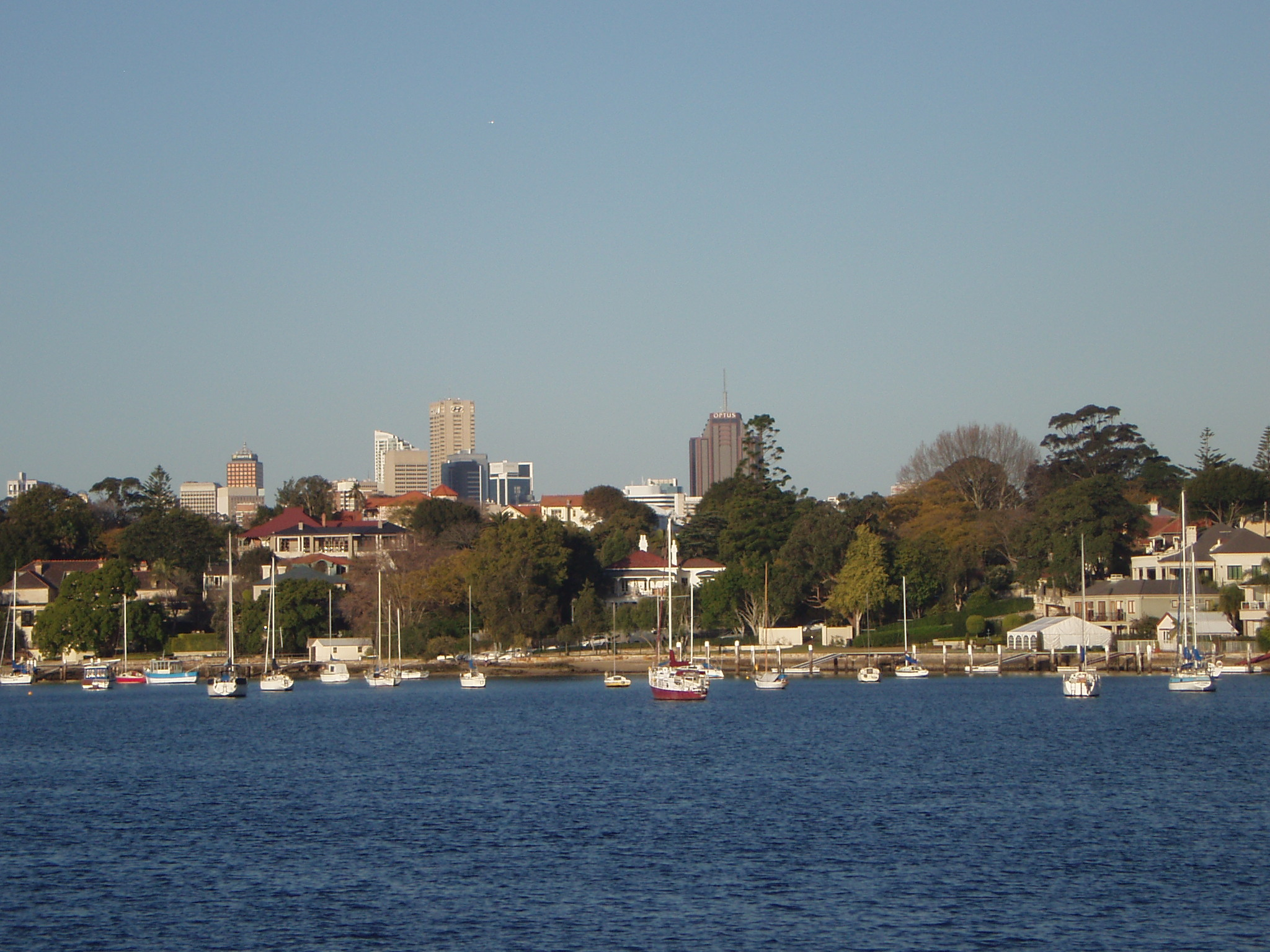
View from Longueville Wharf

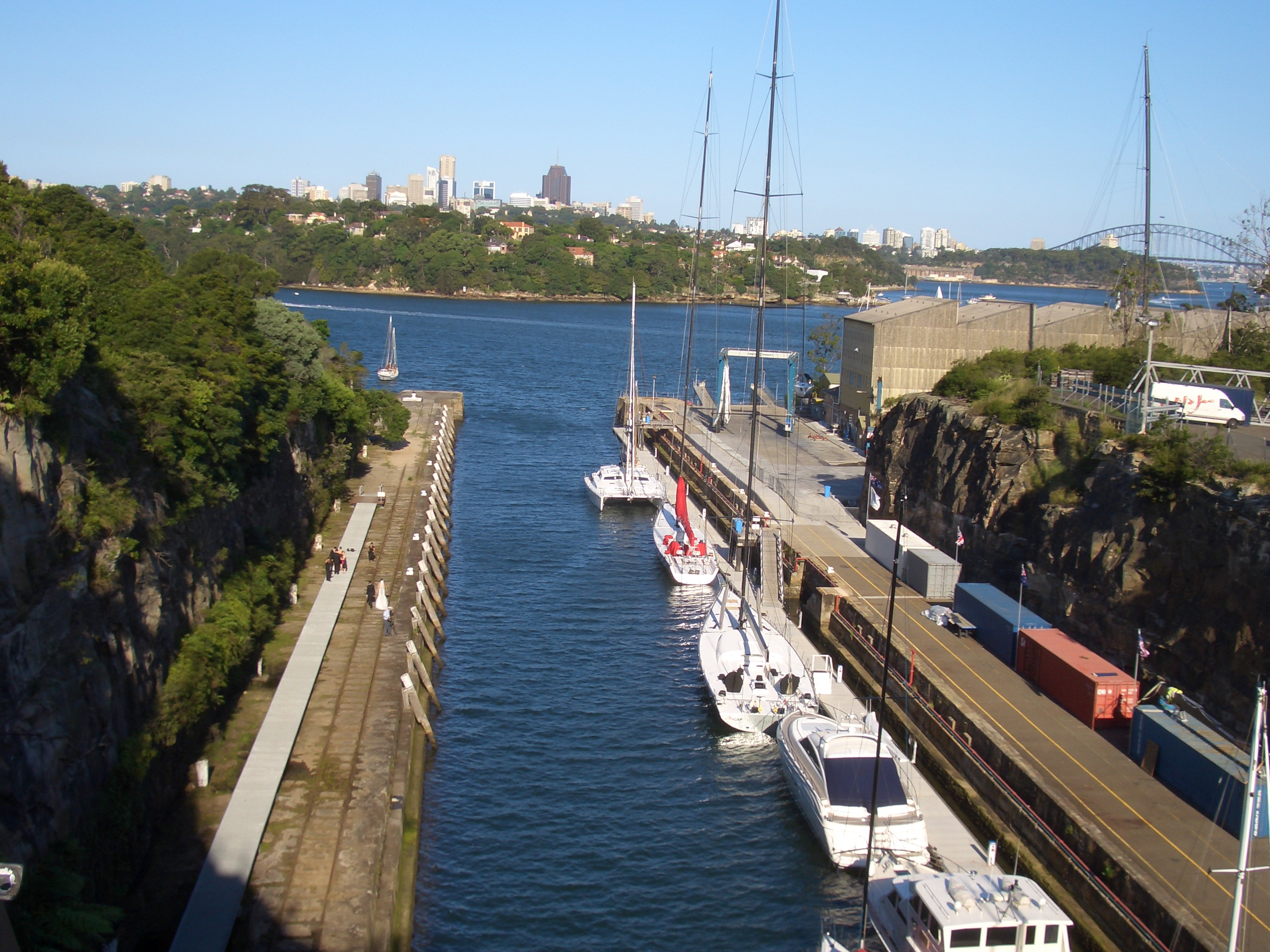
Woolwich Docks

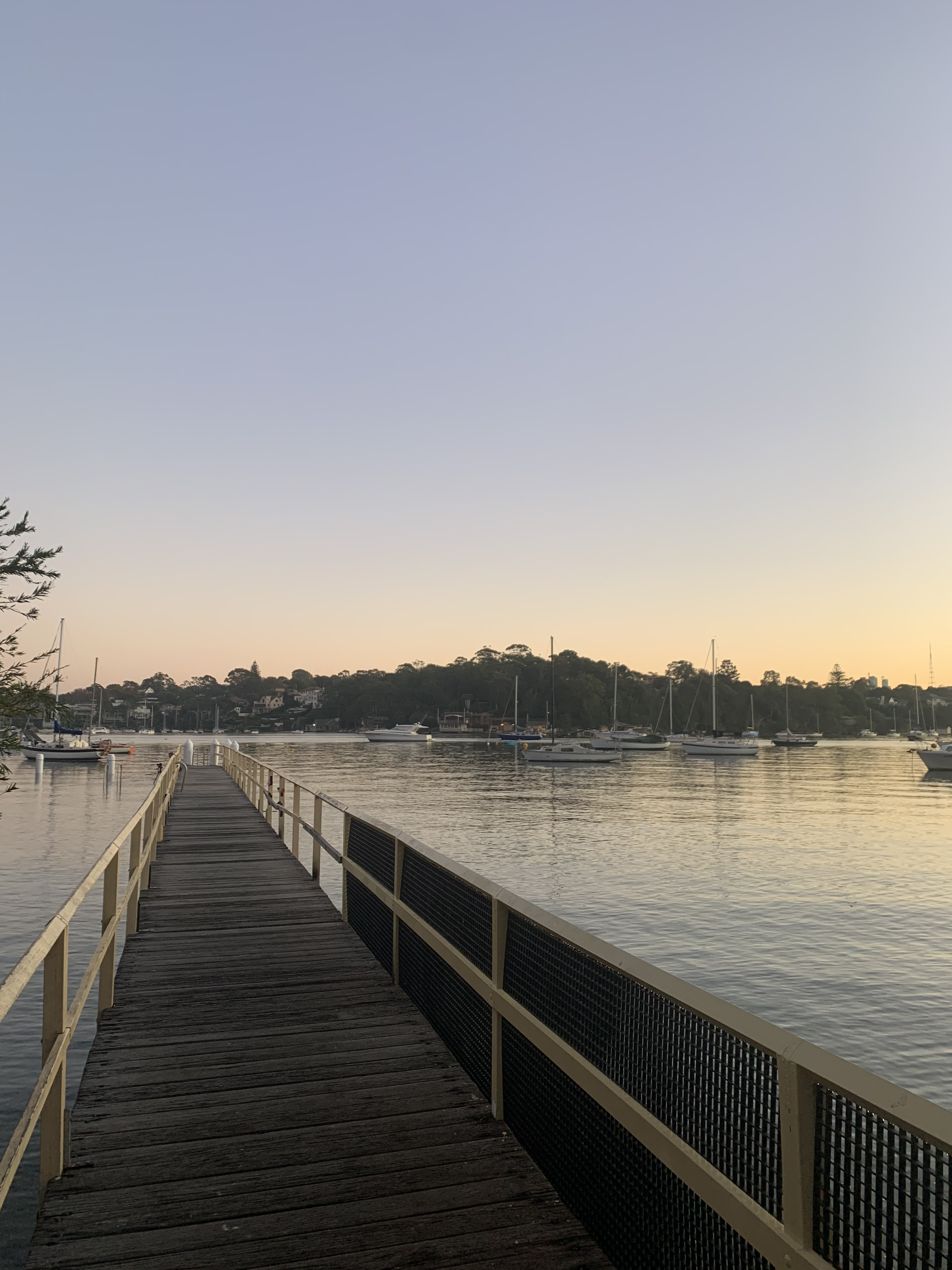
Woolwich Baths

=== Schools ===
Marist Sisters' College, Woolwich and Woolwich Public School.

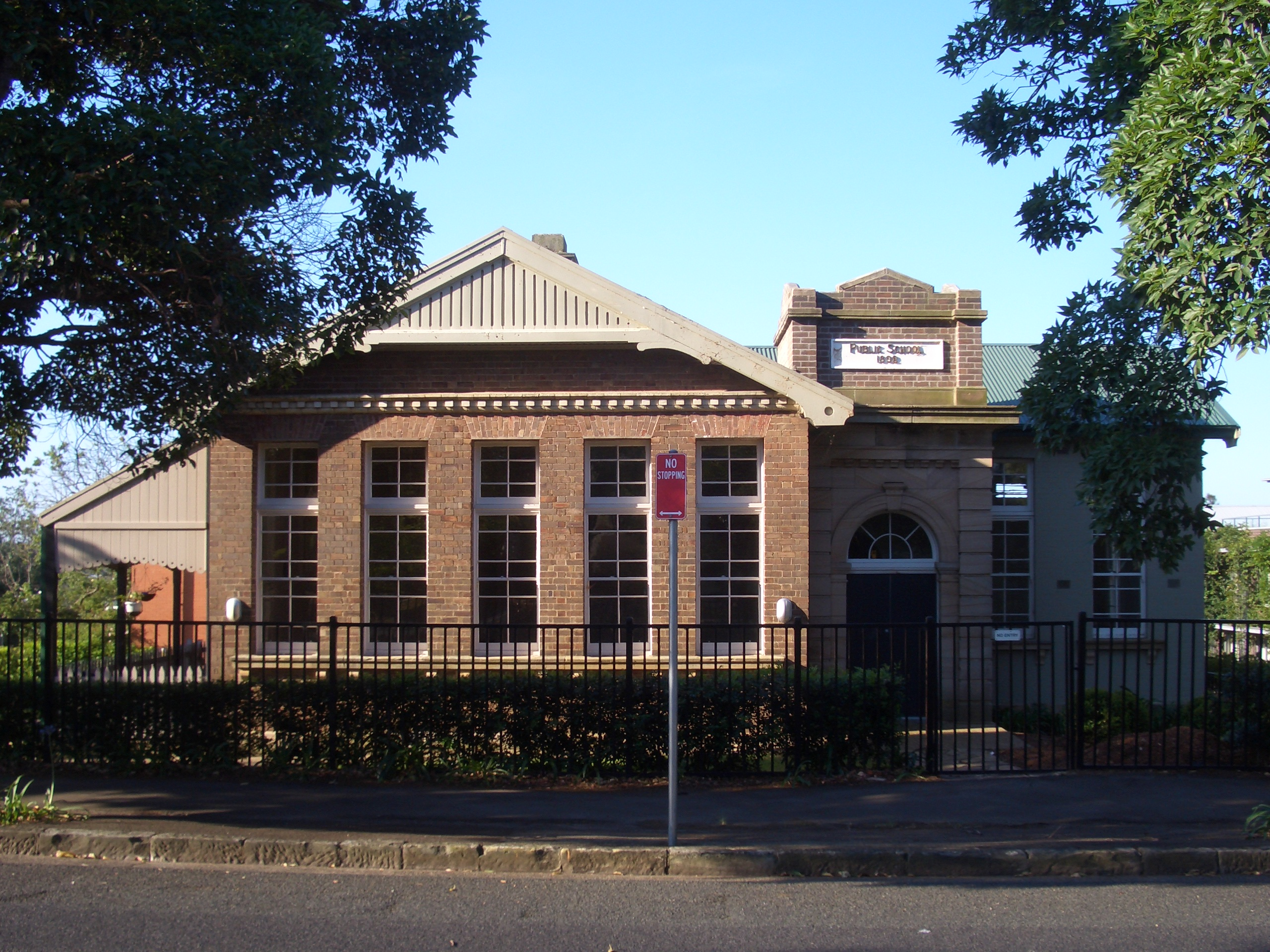
Woolwich Public School

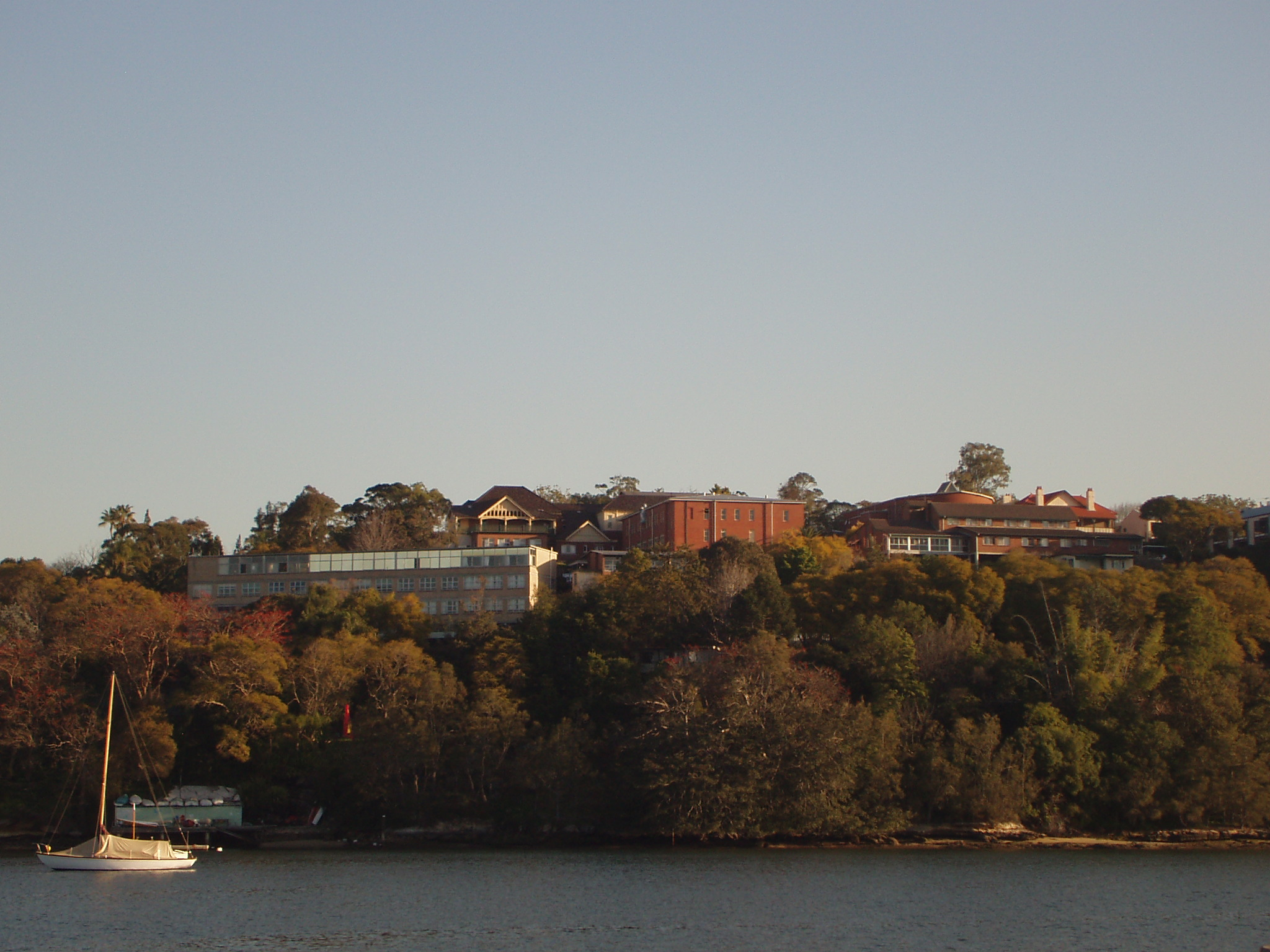
Marist Sisters' College, Woolwich from Longueville Wharf
