= Pallister, Greenwich =

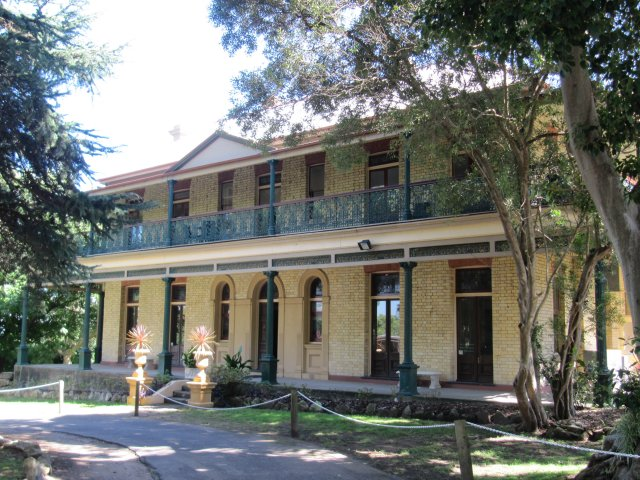

- Location within Sydney Location within Australia
- 33°49′40″S 151°11′04″E
- Location: 95 River Road, Greenwich, Municipality of Lane Cove, New South Wales, Australia

History
- Built: 1892

Site notes
- Architectural style: Victorian Filigree
- Owner: Anglican Church Property Trust

New South Wales Heritage Register
- Official name: Pallister; Standish; Greenwich Hospital
- Type: State heritage (built)
- Designated: 2 April 1999
- Reference no.: 574
- Type: Mansion
- Category: Residential buildings (private)

Pallister is a heritage-listed former private girls' school, children's home and country residence and now hospital at 95 River Road, Greenwich, Municipality of Lane Cove, New South Wales, Australia. It is also known as Standish and Greenwich Hospital. The property is owned by Anglican Church Property Trust. It was added to the New South Wales State Heritage Register on 2 April 1999.

== History ==
Originally named Standish, the villa was constructed in 1892 for John St Vincent Welch. Welch, born in Devonshire, England in 1847, moved to Australia in 1876. He is alleged to have designed Standish himself, although the unusual features of the house, such as the stair hall and roof light, suggest an architect's involvement. Many materials are believed to have been selected during his family's visit to England including the mahogany for the grand stair, the Bangor roof slates, the marble fireplace in the drawing room, plus various pieces of furniture and paintings.

Standish was set back from River Road facing south-east. It looked back across bushland in the direction of Greenwich Road and from the southern side of the house had spectacular views across the Lane Cove and Parramatta Rivers to the Blue Mountains. By 1894 the land in front of the house had been cleared and fenced and was being used as a paddock. The clay driveway with its entrance from River Road had a circular carriage loop in front of the house, and is shown in early images. The drive continued past the northern side of the houe and the kitchen wing, past the men's quarters and continued to the stables and garage area below. It then continued out onto River Road. The entrance had a large timber gateway for carriages and a smaller gate for pedestrians. There were timber fences to River Road and possibly along the eastern boundary as well. Below the driveway on the eastern side the land dropped away and contained caves and grottoes. By 1900 St. Vincent Welch had an observatory built in the grounds, the telescope of which was brought out from England in 1860 to observe the transit of Venus.

Below the gardens on the southern side of the house, stone walls and paths meandered through the bushland. The steps that led down to the lower garden, tennis court and swimming pool were referred to as Tarpeian Way. The grass tennis court and swimming pool were constructed on the 8 lots fronting Gore Street, purchased in 1896. The pool, constructed some time before 1910, was carved into the sandstone shelf and lined with large sandstone blocks. Two more clay tennis courts were located adjacent to River Road.

In 1937 the property was bought by the Sydney Church of England Girls Grammar School (SCEGGS) for the expansion of the school. A 1938 wing was constructed for class rooms designed by the architectural firm Adam, Wright and Apperly. In 1946 the property was acquired by the Church of England Deaconess' Institute as a girls home and renamed Pallister.

By the 1970s Greenwich Hospital had taken over a large part of the grounds, leaving Pallister with only three acres of land. The tennis and netball courts disappeared and by the late 1970s most of these areas had become lawn. In 1981 Pallister ceased to be occupied by the Department of Education Special School, thus ending its nearly 40-year period as a children's home.

From 1981 the house became part of the Greenwich Hospital serving various functions: an Adolescent Counselling Service, followed by a Health Media and Education Centre in the 1980s. It continues to house offices for various departments of the Greenwich Hospital complex.

In 2003 Hope Healthcare Pty Ltd commissioned a Conservation Management Plan for Pallister.

== Description ==
=== Site ===
Standish was set back from River Road facing south-east. IT looked back across bushland in the direction of Greenwich Road and from the southern side of the house had spectacular views across the Lane Cove and Parramatta Rivers to the Blue Mountains. By 1894 the land in front of the house had been cleared and fenced and was being used as a paddock. The clay driveway with its entrance from River Road had a circular carriage loop in front of the house, and is shown in early images. The drive continued past the northern side of the houe and the kitchen wing, past the men's quarters and continued to the stables and garage area below. It then continued out onto River Road. The entrance had a large timber gateway for carriages and a smaller gate for pedestrians. There were timber fences to River Road and possibly along the eastern boundary as well. Below the driveway on the eastern side the land dropped away and contained caves and grottoes. By 1900 St. Vincent Welch had had an observatory built in the grounds, the telescope of which was brought out from England in 1860 to observe the transit of Venus.

Below the gardens on the southern side of the house, stone walls and paths meandered through the bushland. The steps that led down to the lower garden, tennis court and swimming pool were referred to as Tarpeian Way. The grass tennis court and swimming pool were constructed on the 8 lots fronting Gore Street, purchased in 1896. The pool, constructed some time before 1910, was carved into the sandstone shelf and lined with large sandstone blocks. Two more clay tennis courts were located adjacent to River Road.

=== House ===
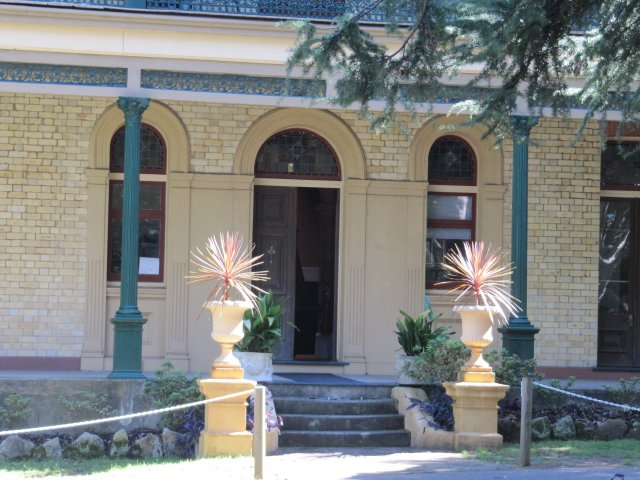
Main entrance

Pallister is a two-storey Late Victorian house with substantial additions to the western side of the building dating from 1937-38 from when the house was adapted as a girls' school for the Church of England.

Both the original house and later additions are constructed of load-bearing brickwork. A two-storey verandah wraps around the house on three sides with cast iron columns and balastrate panels. the main entrance is centrally located below a gable in the eastern facade, flanked by doors and windows on either side.

The main roof is slate with terra cotta hips and ridges. Later additions are generally roofed in terra cotta tiles.

The house interiors are substantially intact, albeit with a number of relatively minor changes and removal of original decorative finishes.

== Heritage listing ==
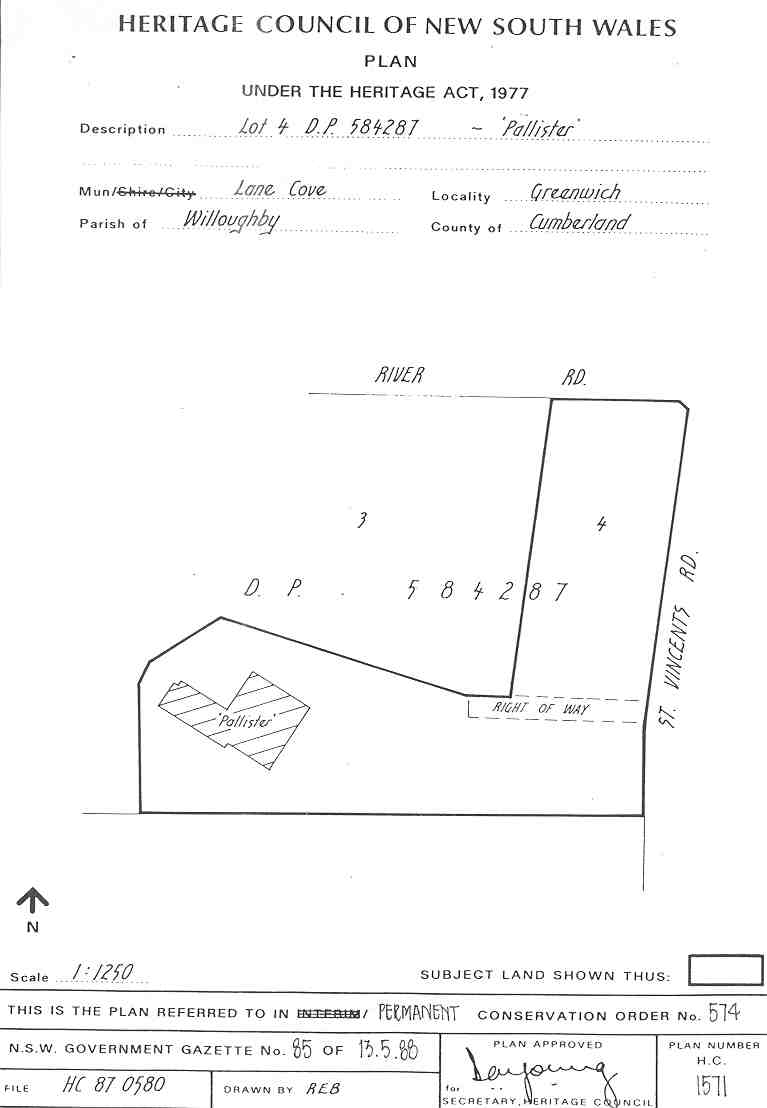
Heritage boundaries

As at 26 May 2006, Pallister incorporated the late Victorian house known as Standish, which was built as a residence for John St Vincent Welch and his family in 1892, and is evidence of residential development and the suburbanisation of the Municipalities of Lane Cove, Willoughby and North Sydney. Standish is a rare example of a late Victorian Gentleman's residence within Greenwich. The house embodies the lifestyle and aspiration of John St Vincent Welch and his family. It is the best surviving example of a late Victorian gentleman's villa and remnant garden setting, including a tear-drop shaped carriage loop in Greenwich. It is associated with John St Vincent Welch and his family. John St Vincent Welch was a prominent businessman, who served the insurance business and the general community on Sydney in a number of ways including: Alderman to Willoughby Council, one of the first aldermen to the Borough of Lane Cove, co-founder of the Sydney Liedertafel (Later called the Apollo Club), member of the Amateur Orchestra Society, trustee of the Art Gallery of New South Wales. The house was the childhood home of Kenyon St Vincent Welch who was the first doctor appointed to the Flying Doctor Service. The buildings has been associated with the Anglican Deaconess Institute Sydney since 1946, and with a wide range of welfare and community activities, particularly in relation to adolescent girls and based on the vision and principles established by Anna Pallister.

Pallister was listed on the New South Wales State Heritage Register on 2 April 1999.

== See also ==
- Australian residential architectural styles
