= Cockatoo Island ferry wharf =

Ferry wharf in Sydney, Australia

Cockatoo Island
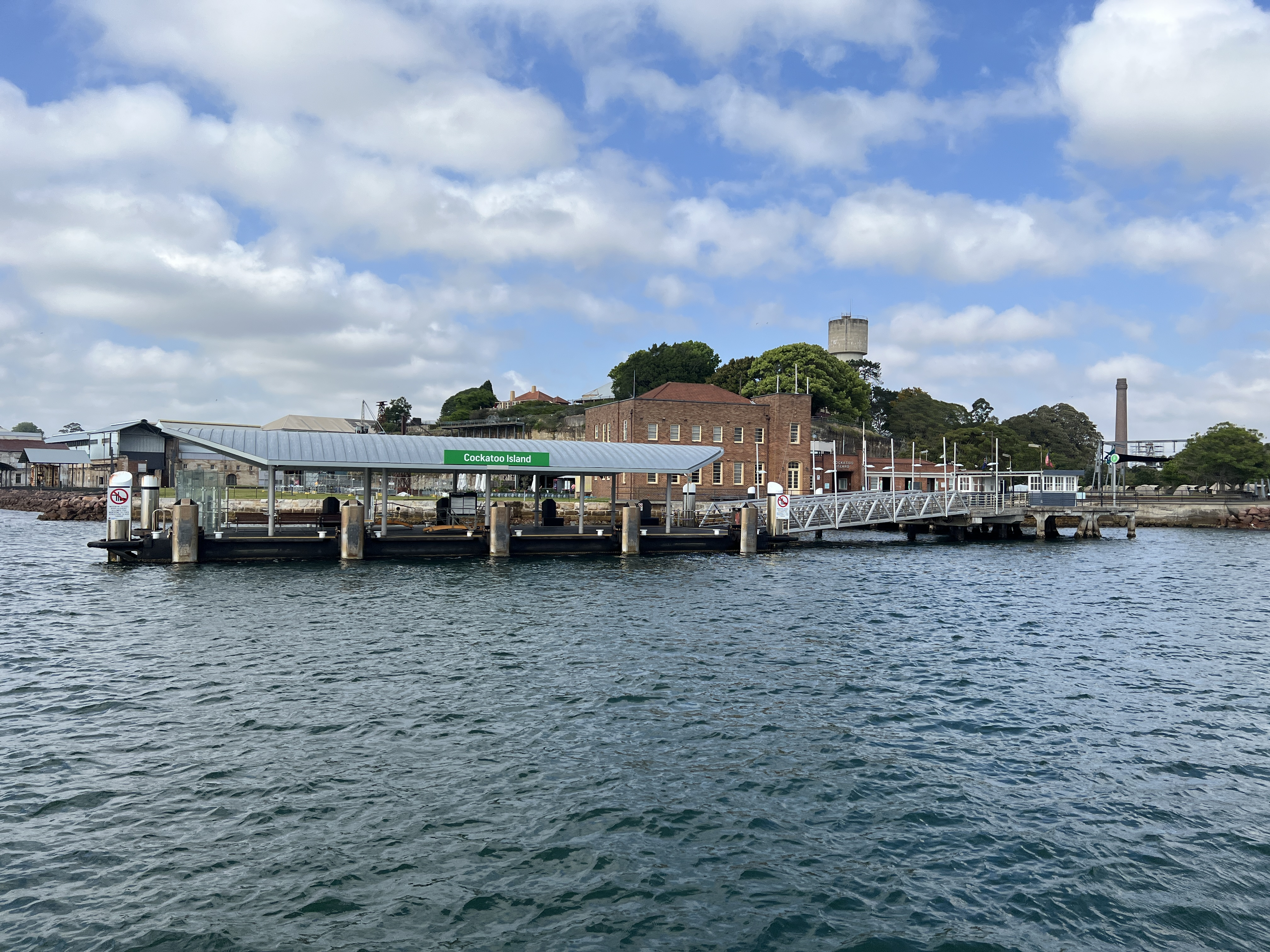
- Wharf in September 2025

General information
- Location: Northern Apron Park, Cockatoo Island; New South Wales; Australia
- Coordinates: 33°50′20″S 151°10′34″E
- Owner: Transport for NSW
- Operator: Transdev Sydney Ferries
- Platforms: 2

Construction
- Accessible: Yes

Other information
- Status: Unstaffed

History
- Rebuilt: 18 August 2017

Services
Preceding wharf	Sydney Ferries	Following wharf
Balmain East towards Circular Quay	F3 Parramatta	Drummoyne towards Parramatta
Woolwich towards Circular Quay	F8 Cockatoo Island	Terminus
Location

Cockatoo Island ferry wharf is located on Sydney Harbour serving Cockatoo Island. It is served by It is served by Sydney Ferries Cockatoo Island services operating to and from Circular Quay and Parramatta River services operating between Circular Quay and Parramatta.

== History ==
When the Cockatoo Island Dockyard was in operation, Sydney Ferries Limited operated services to the island at shift changeover times.

In April 2007, the wharf reopened for a three-month trial coinciding with the reopening of the island as a tourist attraction. Since then services have expanded, and today it is served by Sydney Ferries Parramatta River services operating between Circular Quay and Parramatta as well as being the terminus for Cockatoo Island services. On 18 August 2017 an upgrade was completed which included a new pontoon with two faces to allow two services to call simultaneously.

== Services ==
Platform	Line	Stopping pattern	Notes
1	Parramatta River ferry service	Services to Circular Quay & Parramatta	
1	Cockatoo Island ferry service	Services to Circular Quay	
