= Melrose Park, New South Wales =

Melrose Park
- Suburb
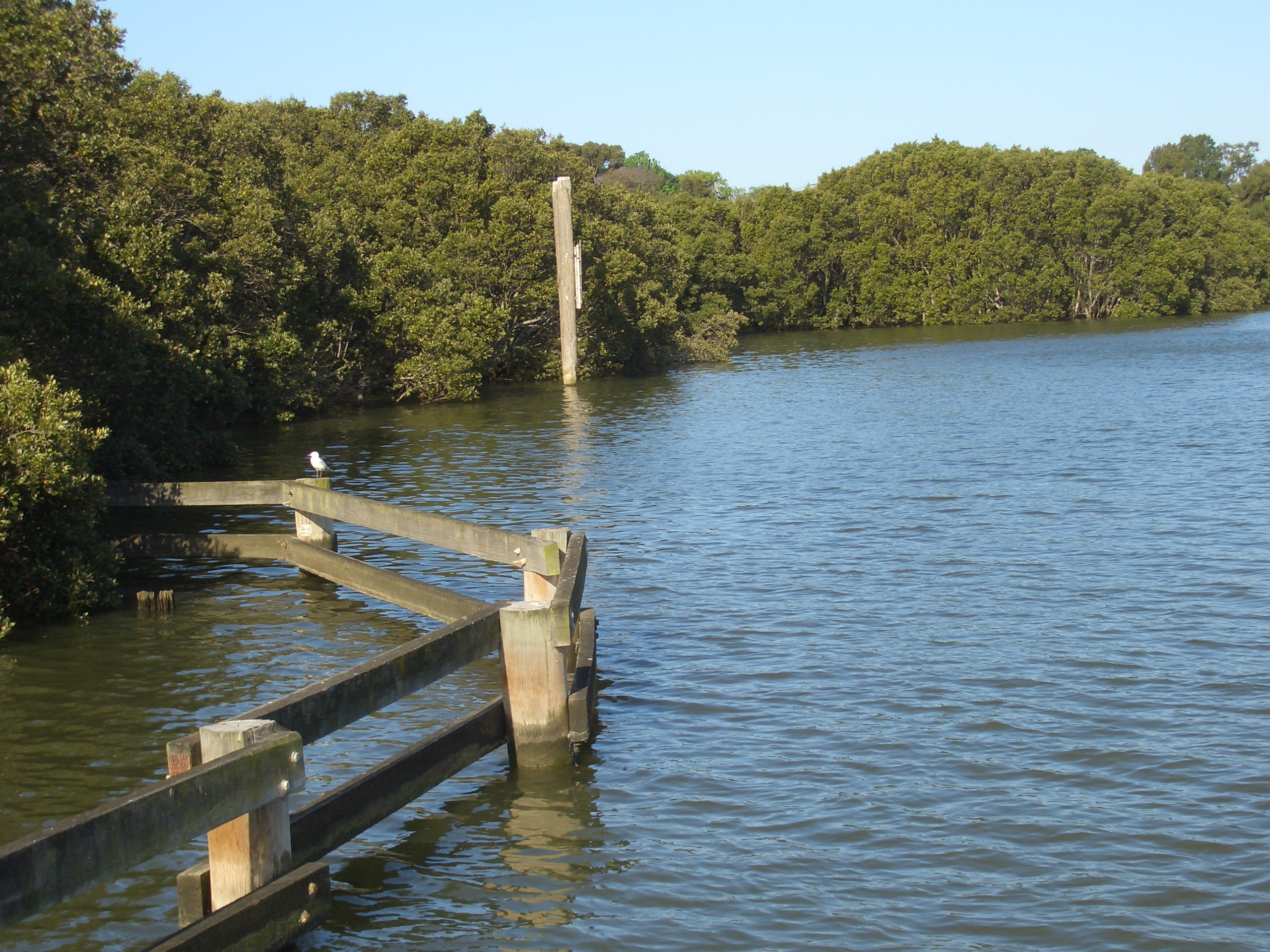
- The Parramatta River at Melrose Park

- Interactive map of Melrose Park
- Coordinates: 33°49′11″S 151°4′38″E
- Country: Australia
- State: New South Wales
- City: Sydney
- LGAs: City of Ryde; City of Parramatta
- Location: 17 km (11 mi) north-west of Sydney CBD

Government
  - State electorates: Parramatta; Ryde
  - Federal divisions: Bennelong; Parramatta

Area
  - Total: 1.08 km^{2} (0.42 sq mi)
- Elevation: 17 m (56 ft)

Population
  - Total: 2,059 (2021 census)
  - Density: 1,906/km^{2} (4,938/sq mi)
- Postcode: 2114
Suburbs around Melrose Park
Ermington	West Ryde	West Ryde
Ermington	Melrose Park	Meadowbank
Sydney Olympic Park	Wentworth Point	Rhodes

Melrose Park is a suburb of Sydney, New South Wales, Australia, located 12 kilometres north-west of the Sydney central business district. Melrose Park is split between the local government areas of the City of Ryde and the City of Parramatta. It is part of the Northern Sydney region. Melrose Park sits on the northern bank of the Parramatta River. The Melrose Park Residents Action Group (MPRAG) and Waterfront Action (WAG) NSW Inc groups represents the community on local and waterfront issues.

== History ==
=== Aboriginal culture ===
The Wallumedegal Aboriginal tribe lived in the area between the Lane Cove River and Parramatta River, which was known as Walumetta.

=== European settlement ===
Major Edmund Lockyer (1784–1860) was a pivotal figure in early Australian colonial history and built and lived in Ermington House (Melrose Park Ryde LGA). His achievements span exploration, governance, and infrastructure, leaving a legacy across (New South Wales), (Queensland), and (Western Australia). Major Lockyers' list of accomplishments around the early 1800's included, Discovery of coal in Queensland (1825), Exploration of the Brisbane River confirming its navigability for sea-going vessels, establishing the first European settlement in Western Australia (Albany 1826–1827), Police Magistrate for Parramatta (1827), Principal Surveyor of Roads & Bridges(1828), First Usher of the Black Rod NSW Legislative Council(1856), Serjeant-at-Arms (1852) and built Ermington House (1828) a two storey sandstone Georgian mansion which included a deepwater convict built sandstone wharf, still standing which provided vital transport links for produce from farms in the Ryde area to (Sydney town) and Lockersleigh Estate (Marulan District). The Sydney suburb of Ermington is named after Lockyer's residence (Ermington House

Melrose Park was the name of the large housing estate subdivided in 1928, with High Water Mark boundaries of riverfront properties, approved by the Sydney Harbour Trust (Roads and Maritime Services). Melrose Park is named in honour of aviator Charles James Melrose (1913–1936). He held a number of flying records, was the only solo flyer to finish the Melbourne Centenary Air Race in 1934 and helped in the unsuccessful search for Sir Charles Kingsford Smith. He died when his plane broke up in turbulence on a charter flight from Darwin to Melbourne. Streets in the suburb also recall other aviators such as Sir Alan Cobham, Jean Batten and Amy Johnson.

== Population ==
In the 2021 Census, there were 2,059 people in Melrose Park. 56.7% of people were born in Australia and 54.4% of people only spoke English at home. The most common responses for religion were Catholic 31.2%, No Religion 31.1% and Anglican 7.4%.

== Transport ==
Melrose Park is served by bus route 524, connecting the suburb to West Ryde and Parramatta. The nearest train station is Meadowbank Station, located in the centre of Meadowbank. The nearest ferry wharf is Meadowbank ferry wharf, located on the Parramatta River at Meadowbank.

Stage 2 of the Parramatta Light Rail is a proposed light rail link between Westmead and Sydney Olympic Park via Parramatta. The project would include the construction of a bridge across the Parramatta River, between Melrose Park and Wentworth Point.

== Redevelopment ==
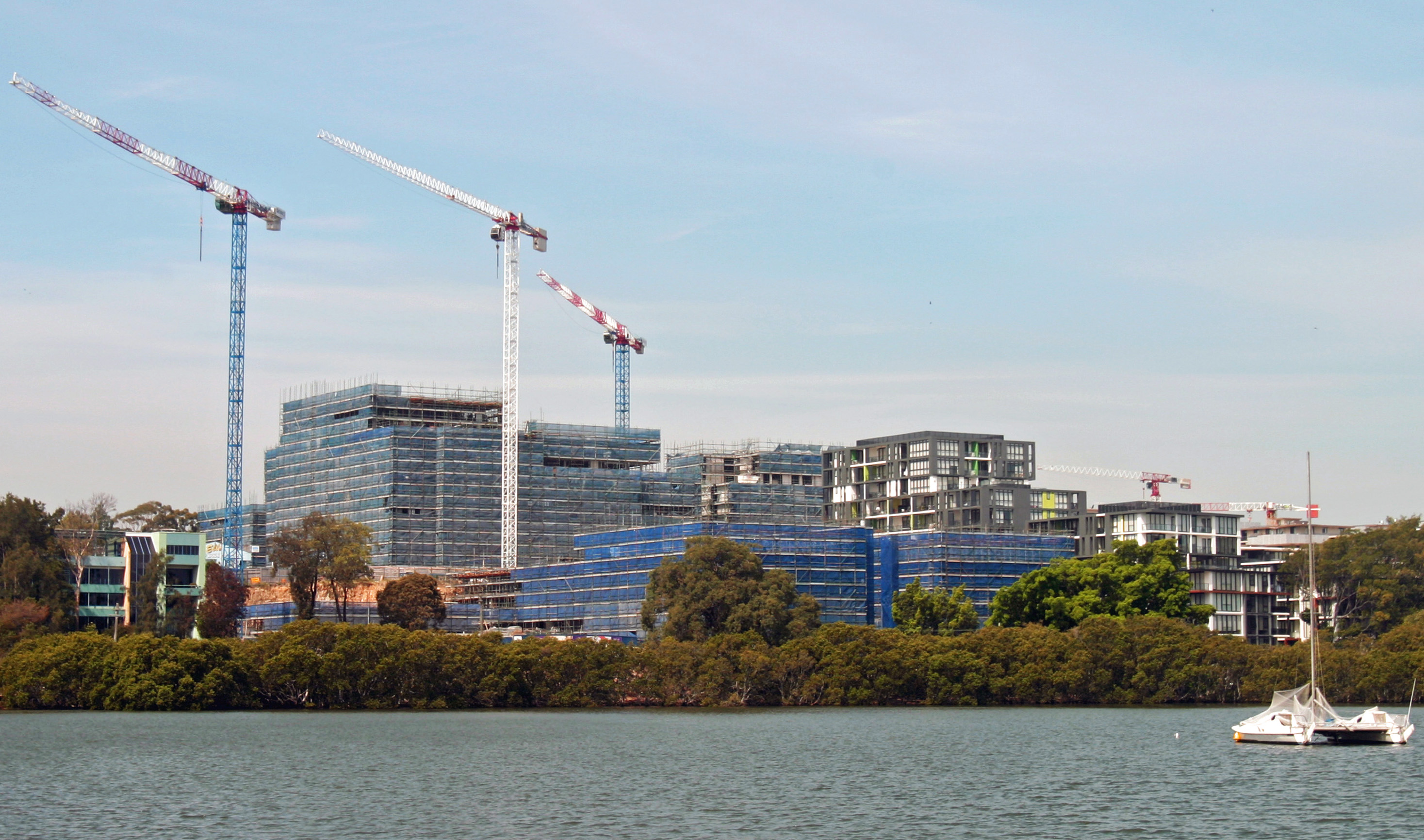
Redevelopment underway on 20 November 2016.

The western part of Ermington, located within the City of Parramatta has historically been industrial, including the Australian operations of large pharmaceutical companies such as Pfizer and Reckitt Benckiser.

In 2005 the NSW Geographic Names Board approved the “boundary creep” of Melrose Park to include much of the Ermington industrial area, which contravenes Principle 6.8.1 of the NSW Address Policy and User Policy May 2021. This “boundary creep” was instigated by City of Parramatta and NSW Geographic Names Board without consultation with City of Ryde or Melrose Park residents within the Ryde Local Government Area.

In February 2016, Payce Consolidated Limited announced plans for a major urban renewal of the industrial part of Melrose Park. This would include the development of 5000 new apartments, new affordable housing, public parks and community facilities. In 2017, Payce Consolidated Limited applied to gain trademark approval for the terms, Melrose Park, Melrose Park Village, & Melrose Park Town Centre from IP Australia without success. An electric shuttle bus service to Meadowbank railway station and West Ryde railway station was proposed. Sustainability proposals include renewable energy generation for new homes, electric charge points for cars, as well as electric shuttle bus services & improved cycleways. The redevelopment is expected to cost $5 billion.
