= Archer Creek =

Archer
- Etymology: in honour of Isaac Archer

Location
- Country: Australia
- State: New South Wales
- Region: Sydney Basin (IBRA), West Central and North West Sydney
- Municipality: Sydney

Physical characteristics
- Source: Brush Farm Park
  - location: Eastwood
  - coordinates: 33°47′40.29″S 151°3′57.6894″E
- Mouth: Parramatta River
  - location: Meadowbank Park, Meadowbank
  - coordinates: 33°49′7.68″S 151°4′51.5994″E

Basin features
- River system: Parramatta River

Archer Creek, a northern tributary of the Parramatta River, is a creek west of Sydney Harbour, located in Sydney, New South Wales, Australia. It joins the Parramatta River at Meadowbank Park, Meadowbank.

== Ecology ==
The source of the creek is in the suburb of Eastwood. The Archer Creek catchment area is 325 hectares (800 acres).

The catchment is bounded by Hughes Avenue, Fitzgerald Road, Marsden Road, Brush Farm, Brush Road, Bellevue Avenue and Adelaide Street. The catchment straddles the boundary between Parramatta and Ryde councils. The catchment rises along the high ridgeline near Brush Farm Park and passes through a number of incised valleys until it reaches the flatter floodplain areas near the Parramatta River. The catchment is well developed. The upper areas are residential with extensive parklands along the creeklines. The flatter areas below Victoria Road contain several large industrial areas, as well as extensive parklands and the Ryde-Parramatta Golf Course.

== History ==
Isaac Archer was granted 80 acres (32 ha) through which this watercourse runs. Isaac Archer was a private in Captain Campbell's company of marines and he received his grant of land from Governor Phillip in 1792.

== See also ==
- Charity Creek, Meadowbank
- Smalls Creek, Meadowbank
