= Meadowbank railway station, Sydney =

Railway station in Sydney, New South Wales, Australia

Meadowbank
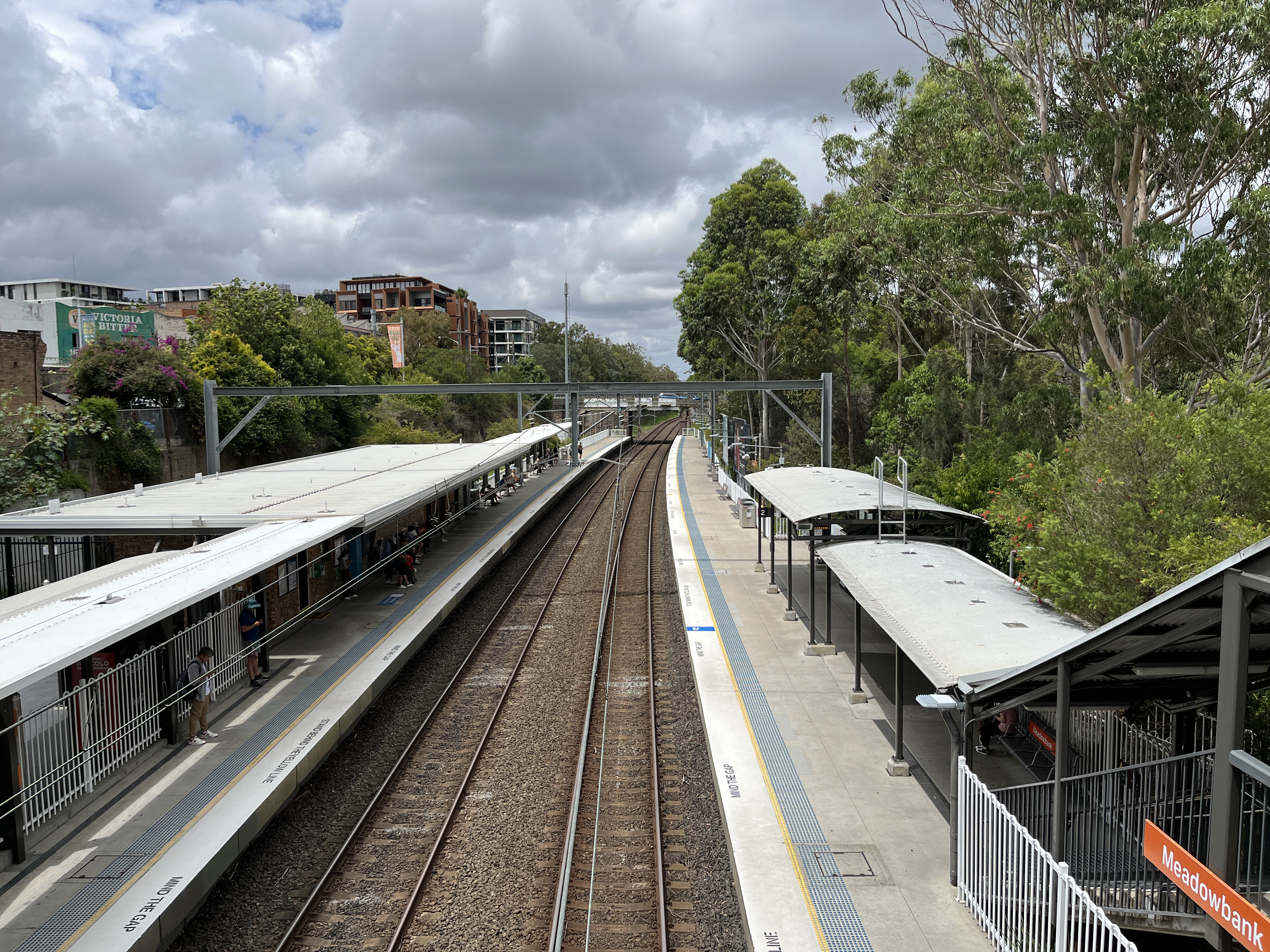
- Southbound view of the station platforms in January 2024

General information
- Location: Constitution Road, Meadowbank; Sydney, New South Wales; Australia
- Coordinates: 33°48′59″S 151°05′24″E
- Elevation: 17 metres (56 ft)
- Owner: Transport Asset Manager of NSW
- Operator: Sydney Trains
- Line: Main Northern
- Distance: 18.19 km (11.30 mi) from Central
- Platforms: 2 (2 side)
- Tracks: 2
- Connections: Bus

Construction
- Structure type: Ground
- Accessible: Yes

Other information
- Status: Staffed
- Station code: MEB
- Website: Transport for NSW

History
- Opened: 1 September 1887 (138 years ago)
- Electrified: Yes (from January 1929)
- Former names: Meadow Bank (1887–1927)

Passengers
- 2025: 2,624,308 (year); 7,190 (daily) (Sydney Trains)
- Rank: 63

Services
Preceding station	Sydney Trains	Following station
West Ryde towards Hornsby	Northern Line	Rhodes towards Gordon via Central
Location

Meadowbank railway station is a suburban railway station located on the Main Northern line, serving the Sydney suburb of Meadowbank. It is served by Sydney Trains T9 Northern Line services.

== History ==
Meadowbank station opened on 1 September 1887 as Meadow Bank, being renamed Meadowbank on 6 November 1927.

An overhead road bridge and footbridge were opened in July 1908, to replace the level crossing previously located at the station. Several fatal accidents had occurred at the crossing, necessitating the grade separation.

To the south of the station, the line crosses the Parramatta River via the John Whitton Bridge. This opened in May 1980 replacing the original iron lattice bridge.

== Services ==
=== Platforms ===
Platform	Line	Stopping pattern	Notes
1	T9	Southbound services to Gordon via Strathfield & North Sydney; 8 weekday morning peak services to Central	
2	T9	Northbound services to Hornsby	

=== Transport links ===
Busways operates two bus routes via Meadowbank station, under contract to Transport for NSW:

- 507: to Gladesville and Hyde Park
- 518: Meadowbank ferry wharf to Macquarie University via Top Ryde and Denistone East

Meadowbank station is served by one NightRide route:

- N80: Hornsby station to Town Hall station
