= Charity Creek =

Charity
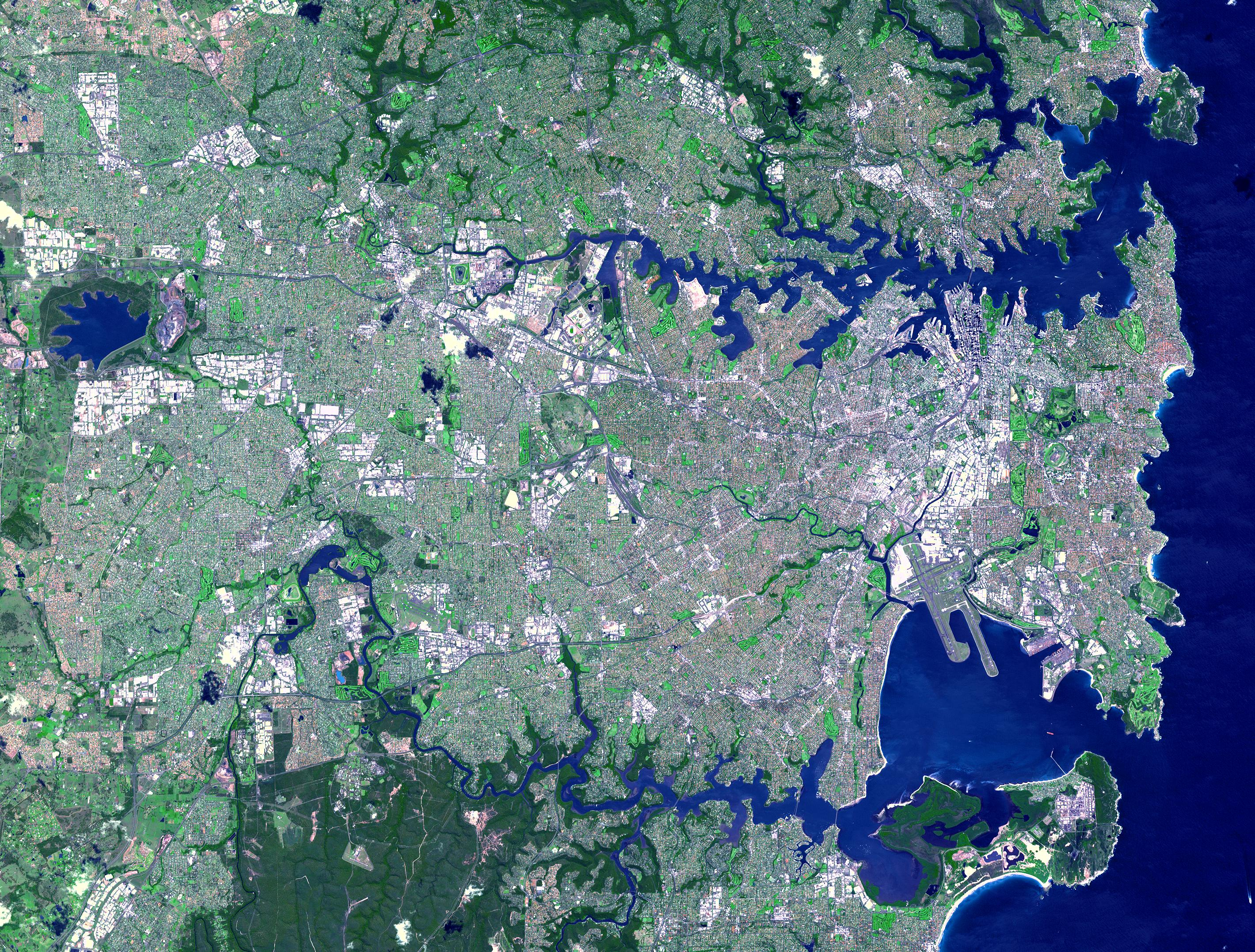
- NASA satellite view of Greater Metropolitan Sydney, with the location of the mouth of the Charity Creek

Location
- Country: Australia
- State: New South Wales
- Municipality: Sydney

Physical characteristics
- Source: Denistone Park
  - location: West Ryde
  - coordinates: 33°47′52.8″S 151°5′34.7994″E
- Mouth: Parramatta River
  - location: Meadowbank Park, Meadowbank
  - coordinates: 33°49′8.94″S 151°5′8.952″E

Basin features
- River system: Parramatta River

Charity Creek, a northern tributary of the Parramatta River, is a creek west of Sydney Harbour, located in Sydney, New South Wales, Australia. It joins the Parramatta River at Meadowbank Park, Meadowbank.

== Ecology ==
The source of the creek is in the suburb of West Ryde. The Charity Creek catchment area is 237 hectares (590 acres).

The catchment is bounded by Victoria Road, Devlin Street, Blaxland Road, Marlow Avenue and the Main Northern railway line. The catchment boundary crosses the railway line just south of West Ryde railway station. The catchment is predominantly residential with some commercial development in the vicinity of Rhodes Street and Herbert Street. Most of the drainage system in the Charity Creek catchment consists of concrete pipes or boxed culverts. The creek is culverted down to Meadowbank Boys High School. Below this is a short reach of natural open channel to the railway line. Downstream of the railway line the creek is a concrete lined channel. All the tributaries of Charity Creek are piped.

Charity Creek Cascades, named after the creek, is an interconnected series of council parks running from Top Ryde to West Ryde railway station. The area covers approximately 0.48 hectares (1.2 acres), and stretches from Shepherd Street to Linton Lane.

== History ==
Charity Point, near Charity Creek, is attributed to William Bennet, an early settler who was both a farmer and South Sea trader. When his ships need repairing, a large number of south-sea islander crew camped on the shore. His kind treatment to them earned the names Charity Creek and Charity Headland.

Dinner Point, now called Charity Point, at the Meadowbank Memorial Park, is said to have acquired its name on 15 February 1788. First Lieutenant William Bradley wrote:

At 1pm returned to the Boats and after dinner went in the smallest boat over the flats past a mangrove island.

Bradley then followed a creek so narrow that boat oars stuck their struck the sides until they were stopped by fallen trees. Charity Point, once backed by a creek which has been filled in, was originally named Mur-ray-mah, perhaps meaning 'black bream', heard by the linguist Lieutenant William Dawes as karóoma (garuma). Charity Point was also a popular fishing spot. Kent, a nephew of Governor John Hunter, was first granted 170 acres (69 ha) on 12 May 1796. He received a further grant in 1803, when his nephew William Kent Jnr obtained 570 acres (230 ha) in the district of Eastern Farms. It was after the 1840s that the former orchards and farms of the Ryde area began to be subdivided and Charity Creek was filled in.

== See also ==
- Smalls Creek, Meadowbank
- Archer Creek, Meadowbank
