= Meadowbank, New South Wales =

Meadowbank
- Suburb
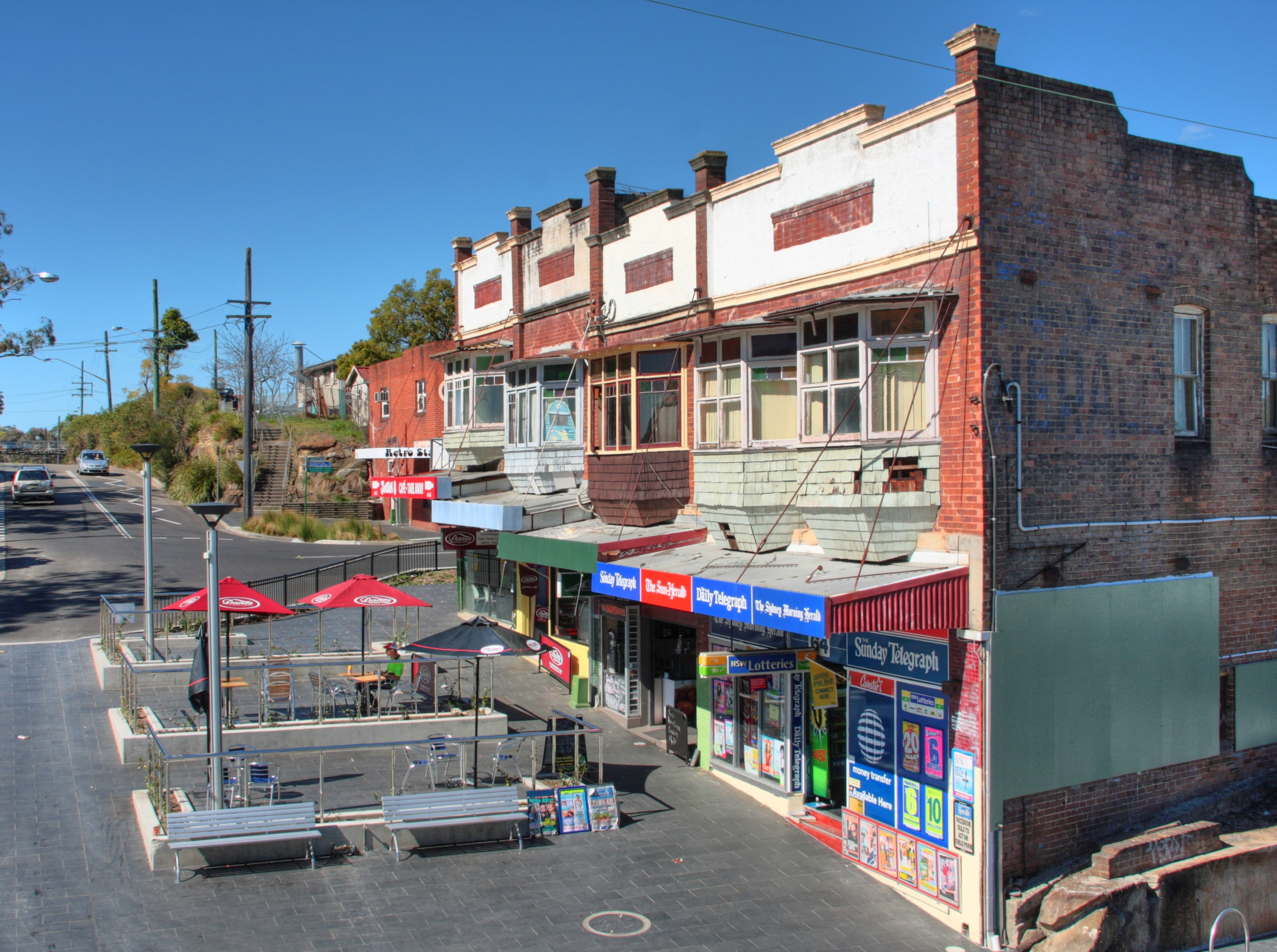
- Meadowbank railway shops and outdoor eating area

- Interactive map of Meadowbank
- Country: Australia
- State: New South Wales
- City: Sydney
- LGA: City of Ryde
- Location: 15 km (9.3 mi) north-west of Sydney CBD
- Established: 1801

Government
  - State electorate: Ryde
  - Federal division: Bennelong

Area
  - Total: 0.7 km^{2} (0.27 sq mi)
- Elevation: 20 m (66 ft)

Population
  - Total: 5,089 (2021 census)
  - Density: 7,300/km^{2} (18,800/sq mi)
- Postcode: 2114
Suburbs around Meadowbank
Denistone	West Ryde	Ryde
Melrose Park	Meadowbank	Putney
Homebush Bay	Rhodes	Breakfast Point

Meadowbank is a suburb of Sydney, New South Wales, Australia, 15 kilometres north west of the Sydney central business district, in the local government area of the City of Ryde and part of the Northern Sydney region. Meadowbank sits in a valley on the northern bank of the Parramatta River.

== History ==
=== Aboriginal culture ===
The territory from Sydney Cove to Parramatta, on the northern side of the Parramatta River, was thought to be that of the Wallumattagal, and had the aboriginal name Wallumetta, the territory of the Wallumede people.

Aboriginal people in the Sydney district were clans of larger groups sharing a common language. Three language groups have been identified in the Sydney Region – the Kuringgai (or Guringai), the Dharug (or Dharruk / Dharuk / Darug), and the Dharawal (or Tharawal). The Wallumedegal are thought to have been within the Dharug speaking area.

=== European settlement ===
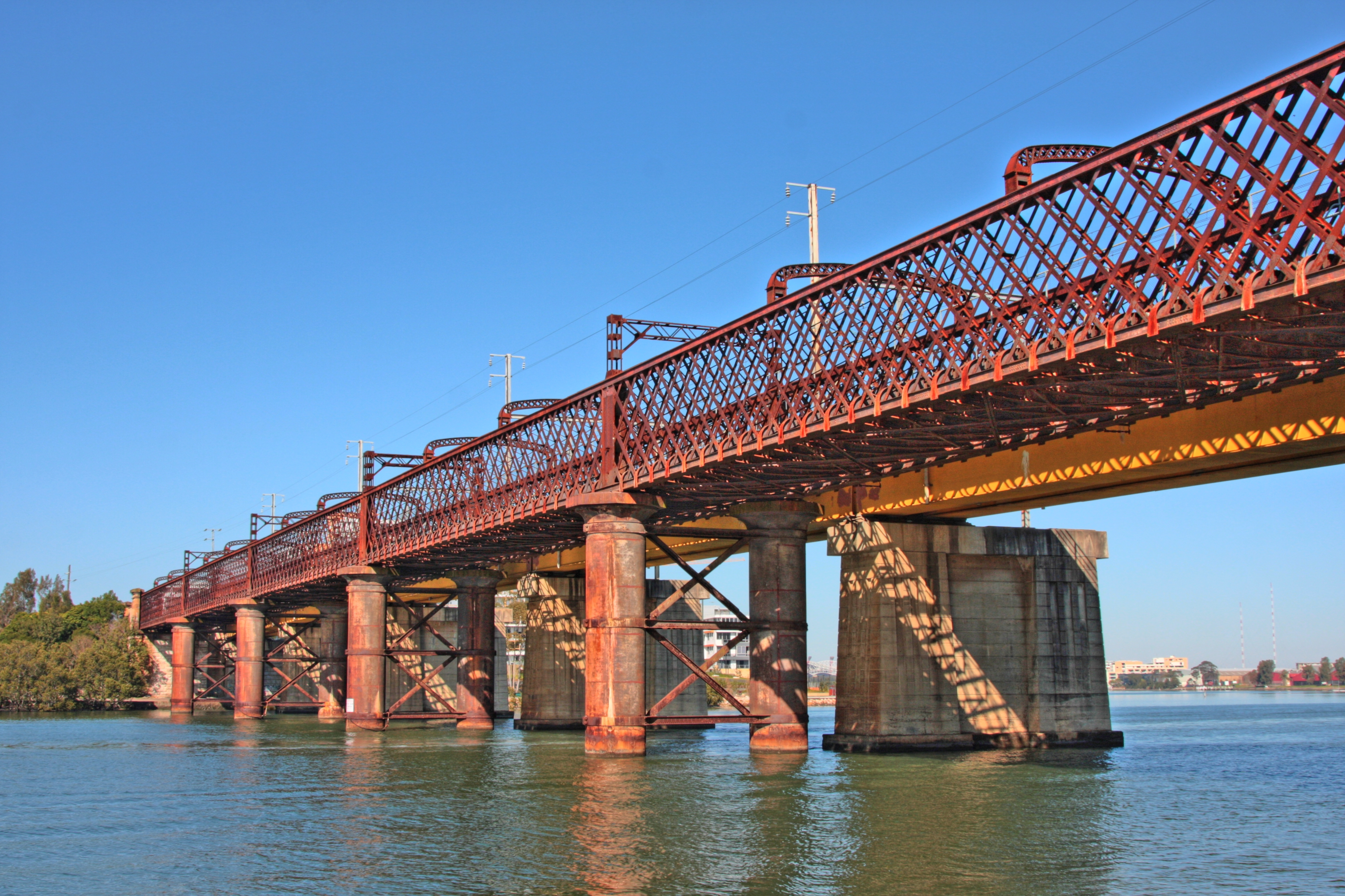
Meadowbank Railway Bridge

Land originally granted to Surgeon William Balmain in 1794, in the district of the Field of Mars, was bestowed the name 'Meadow Bank'. Balmain returned to England in 1801, leaving his estates to be managed by fellow surgeon D'Arcy Wentworth. Wentworth agreed to sell Balmain's grants to John Bennett, an ex-convict who had been transported in 1795. By 1819 both the 'Meadow Bank Estate' and 'Chatham Farm' to the north, belonged to Bennett. In 1823 he was joined by his nephew William Bennett. John Bennett died in July 1829, a bachelor, and his nephew inherited his estate, building Meadowbank House around 1835. William then sold 'Chatham Farm' to Major Edward Darvall in 1855. William Bennett died in 1865 but his widow remained at Meadowbank until her death in 1879. The estate was subdivided in the late 1880s, given impetus by the opening of the Main Northern railway line from Strathfield to Hornsby in 1886. Meadowbank station opened as Hellenic, later being renamed Meadowbank, after the Meadowbank Estate. Meadowbank Public Baths established in 1895 was a former recreation destination but were closed in 1943 due to pollution from Homebush Bay. Shepherds Bay Row Boat ferry services were established as early as 1794 from Schooner Wharf (Belmore Road, near Helene Park) taking passengers to the Concord shore.

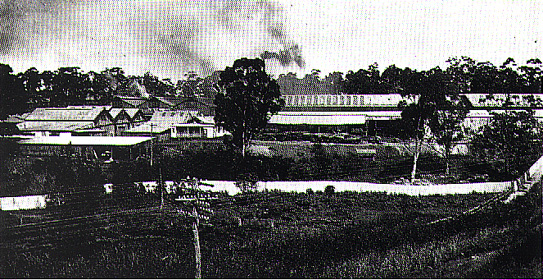
Meadowbank Manufacturing Company workshops 1922

Meadowbank Manufacturing Company Works was the first industry in Meadowbank, established on 95 acres of land in 1890, with frontage to the Parramatta River and easy access to the railway producing agricultural equipment for the local area and throughout the country. The existing seawall is made from the remnants of the original sandstone. Shepherds Bay is named after early settler James Shepherd, transported as a convict in 1791. Vineyard terraces were located on the upper slopes. Former Ryde Wharf and punt located in Shepherds Bay Park. Remnants of wharf walling visible at low tide. The Ryde to Rhodes punt operated between 1898 and 1935. Passengers included employees of the State Timber yards at Rhodes and cattle. The punt was unreliable; "the cable continually gave way and cargoes of cattle went sailing downstream".

Ryde Council investigated potential sites for the Ryde Baths in 1877 and the desirability of having public baths. Ten years later, when a man was killed whilst bathing at Ryde Wharf, the issue was raised again. In 1904, a site was chosen at the bottom of Waterview Road. The Ryde Swimming Baths were opened in 1905. Mixed bathing was not permitted. Ryde Bridge took two years to build, and opened in 1935. A series of tolls were applied and were ceased to be collected in 1949. State Timber Yards were opposite on Rhodes Peninsula.

== Heritage listings ==
Meadowbank has a number of heritage-listed sites, including:

- Meadowbank Railway Bridge

== Commercial area ==
Meadowbank is a mixed commercial-residential area. Meadowbank features a small group of shops on either side of Meadowbank railway station and a shopping centre within the residential apartment complex to the south, along Bay Drive.

Meadowbank has waterfront high-rise apartments with views of the Parramatta River, and cafés and restaurants along the water's edge.

Meadowbank TAFE is situated on the east side of the station. It is one of the largest TAFE NSW colleges in Sydney, at approximately 15 thousand square metres.

== Transport ==
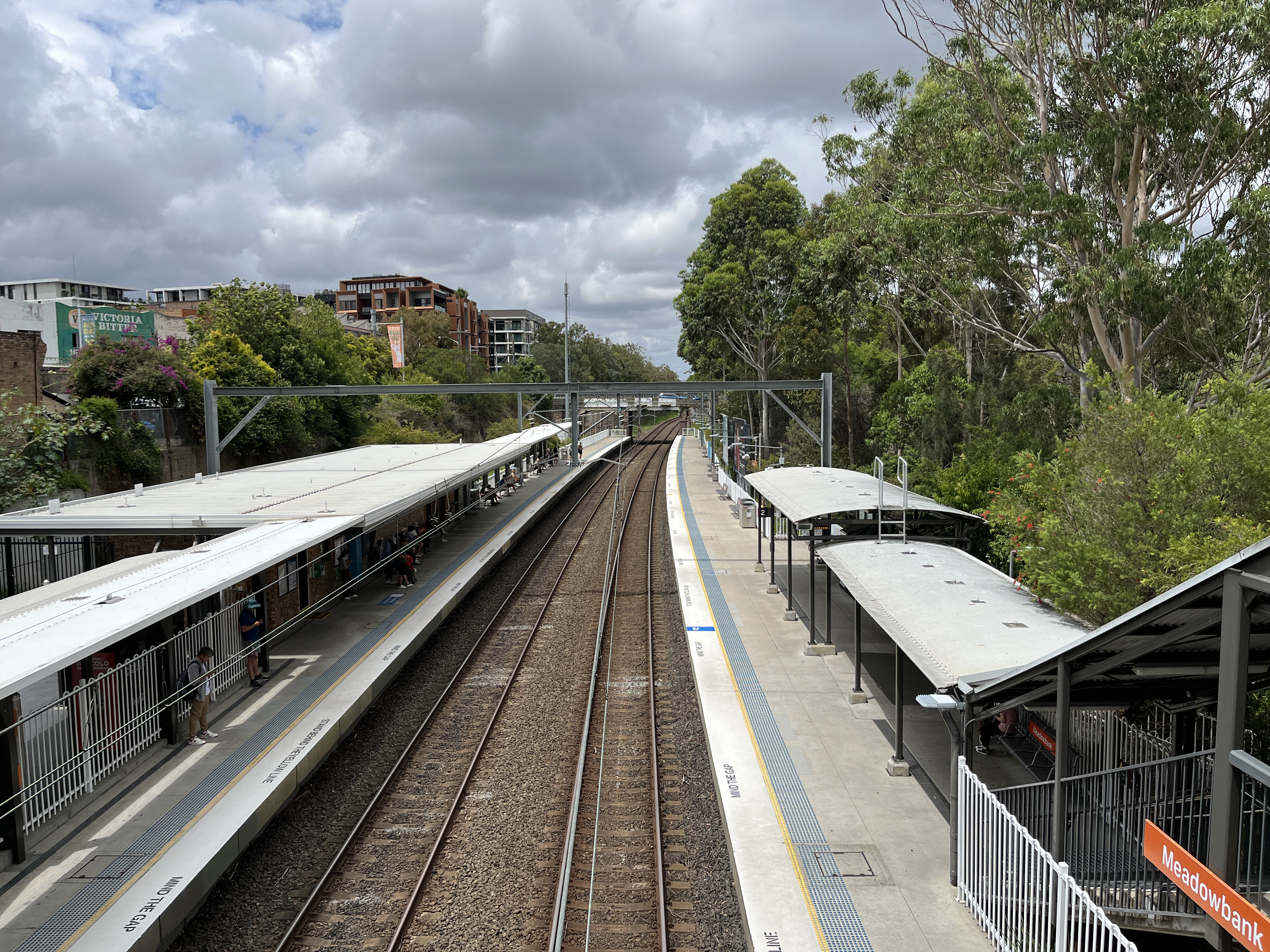
Meadowbank railway station

Meadowbank is easily accessible by Road, Ferry, Bus and Train. Meadowbank experiences limited traffic as major roads circle rather than run through the suburb. Lane Cove Road to the east, Victoria Road to the north and Adelaide Street to the West. Other central roads include Constitution Road, Meadow Crescent and Bank Street.

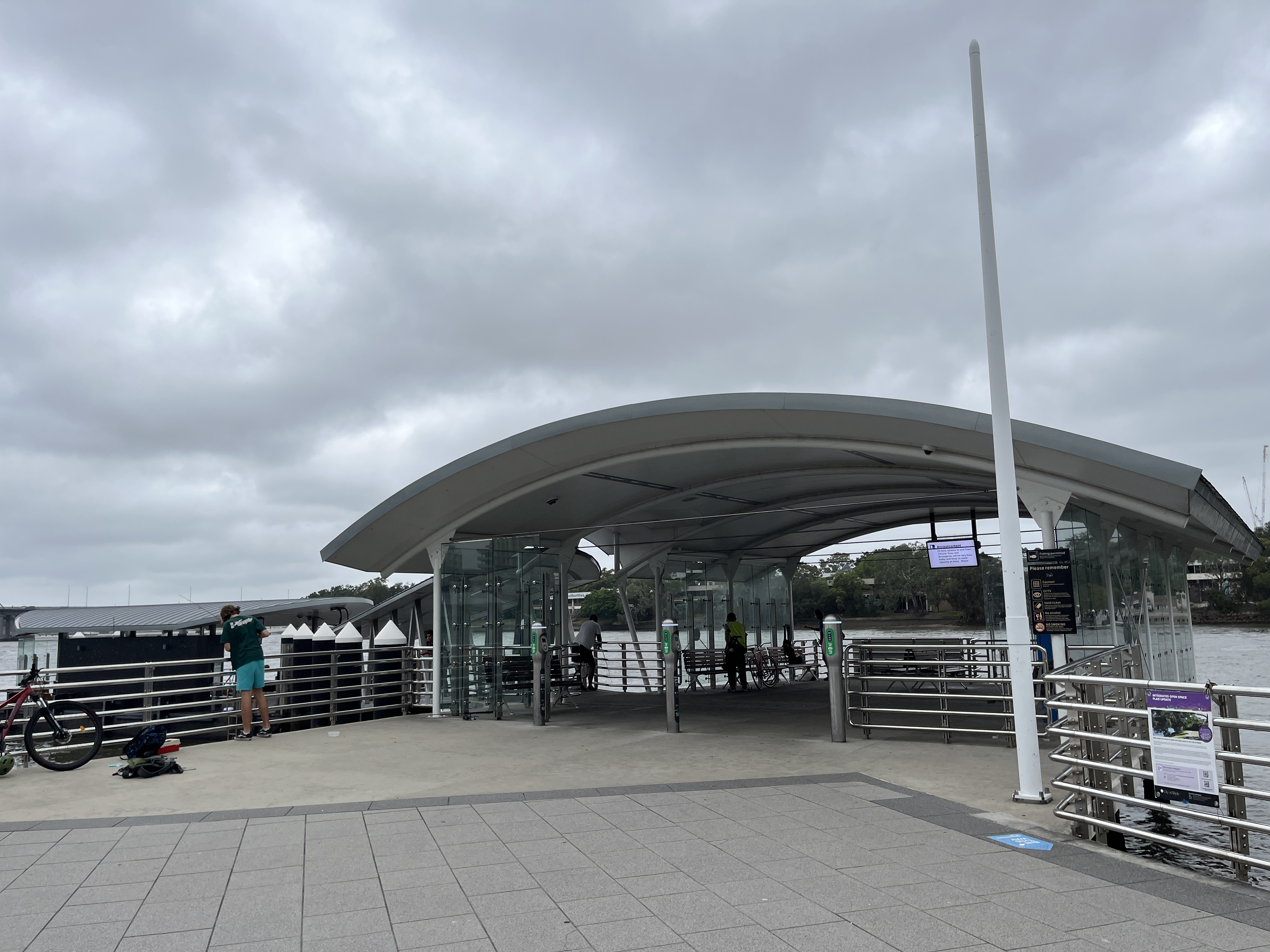
Meadowbank ferry wharf

Meadowbank railway station is on the Main Northern railway line. Meadowbank has two side platforms. The station is served by four trains per hour each way, with additional trains on weekday peak hours. The station is within walking distance of Meadowbank ferry wharf served by Sydney to Parramatta ferries.

Meadowbank has a ferry wharf on the Parramatta River as part of the Sydney Ferries network. The next wharf west is Sydney Olympic Park and east is Kissing Point. The ferry primarily services tourists on weekends and city workers during the week.

== Landmarks and features ==
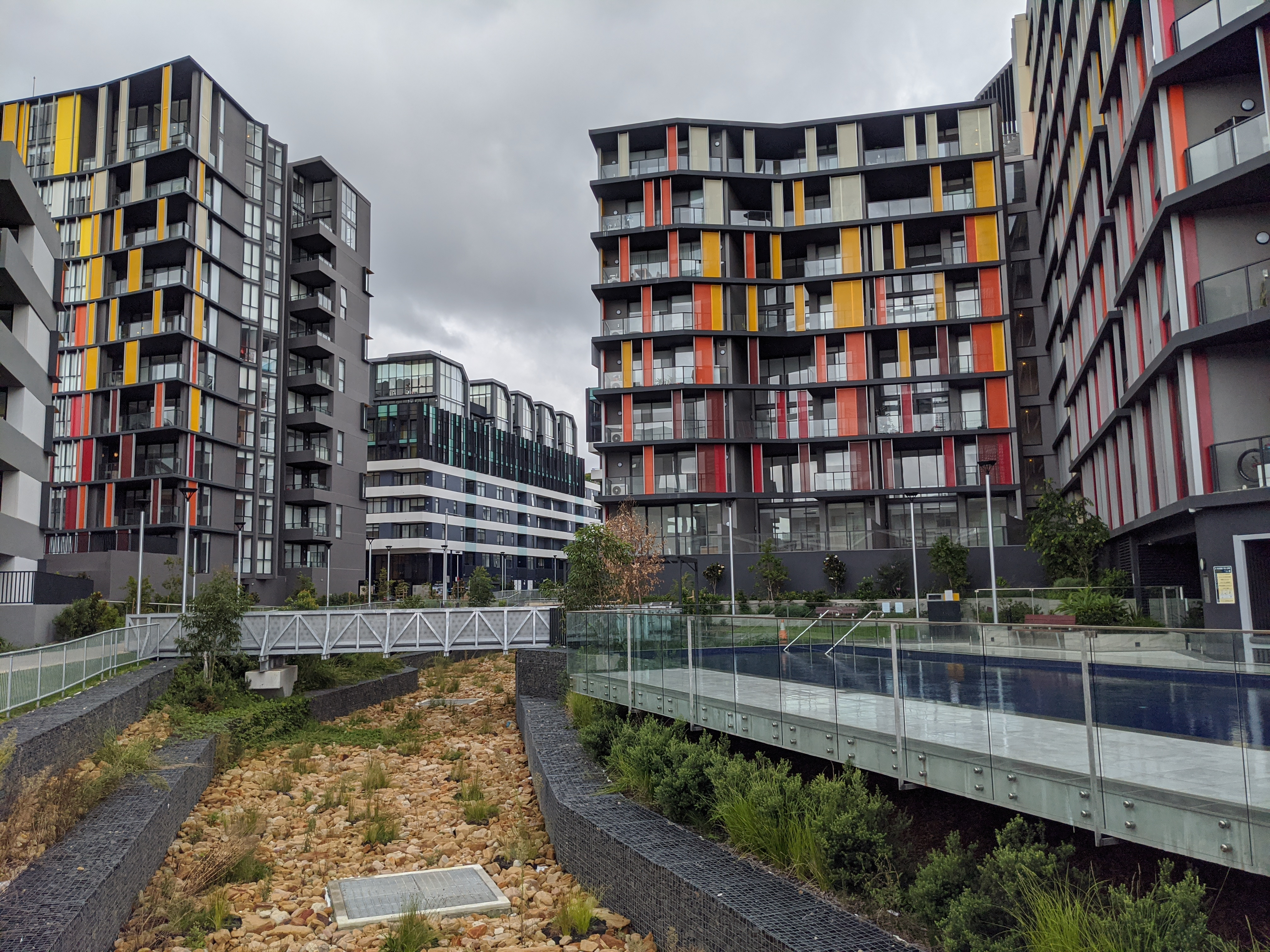
Apartments along the Meadowbank waterfront

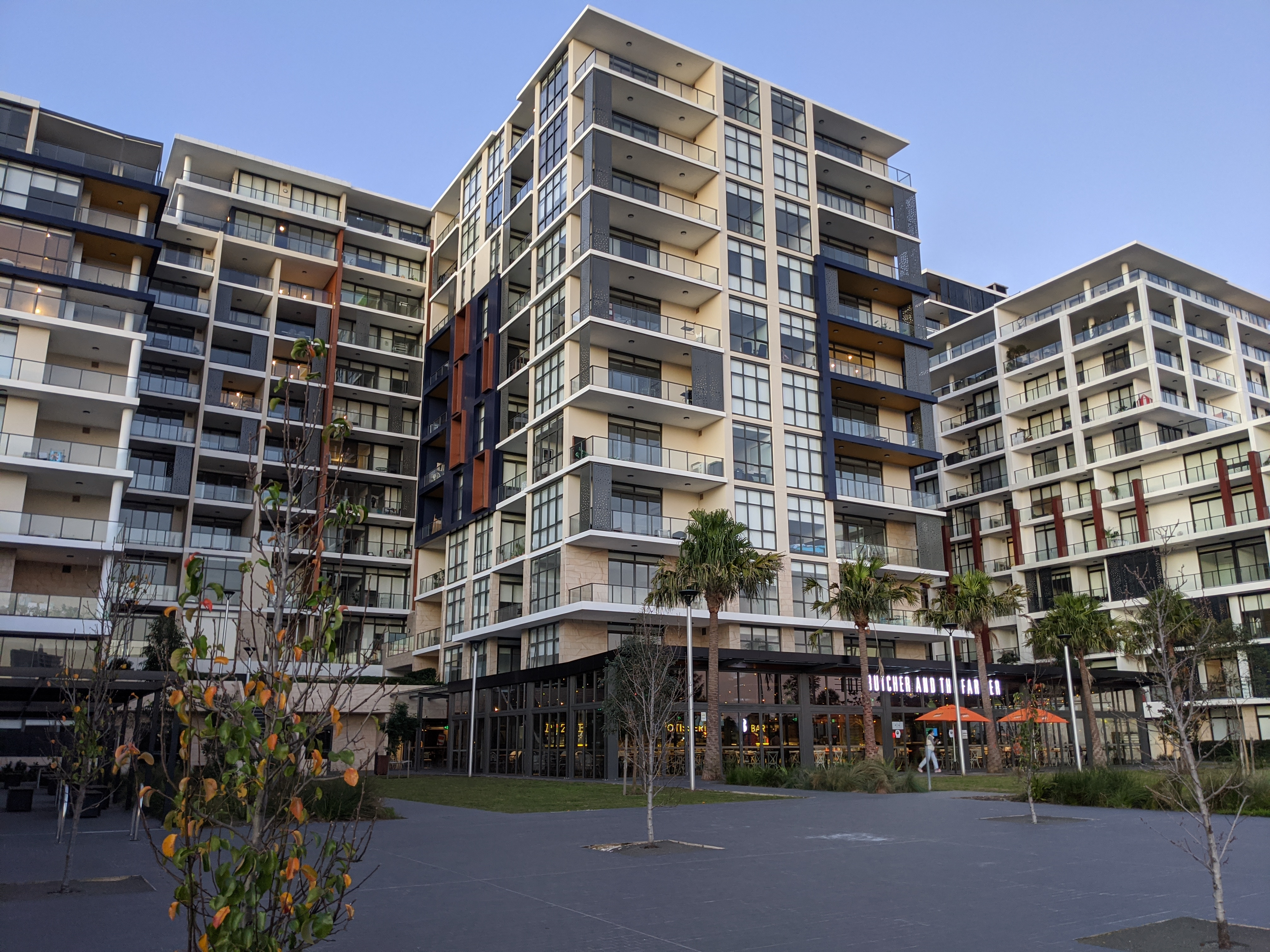
Rothesay Avenue

=== Schools ===
- Meadowbank Multipurpose Learning Centre is the local Long Day care centre for children aged 0–6 and provides a Before and After School Care facility for the children of Meadowbank Public School.
- The Italian Bilingual School. This school moved from Leichhardt to See Street, Meadowbank in 2013. It offers students a bilingual education in English and Italian.
- Meadowbank TAFE
- St Michael's School is a Catholic primary school, founded in 1922 by the Sisters of Mercy.
- Meadowbank Public School.
- Marsden High School. 7-12 co-educational government secondary school located within the newly built Meadowbank Education Precinct. School also hosts a NSW DoE Intensive English Centre for newly arrived high school aged EAL/D students.

=== Churches ===
- Meadowbank International Church
- Ryde Presbyterian Church
- St. Michael's Catholic Church
- River City Church

=== Parks ===
Meadowbank features great public access to Parramatta River and surrounding parklands.

- Meadowbank Park, Constitution Road. Major sports field complex for football, soccer, cricket, baseball, hockey, and netball. Bike and jogging track on Parramatta River foreshore, forming part of the Parramatta Valley Cycleway.
- Memorial Park – Meadow Crescent. Adjacent to the Parramatta River. Bike track, part of the Parramatta Valley Cycleway. RiverCat Ferry Wharf. A WWII Memorial Walk has been constructed using stones from each country where Australians served or were stationed.
- Anderson Park, Parsonage Street
- Ann Thorn Park, Constitution Road
- Helene Park, Bowden Street
- Headland Park, Bowden Street
- Woolway Park, Union Street (West Ryde)

=== Waterways ===
- Archers Creek
- Charity Creek
- Parramatta River
- Smalls Creek

=== Scout halls ===
- 1st Meadowbank Scout Group located in Angas Street
- Epping Scout Group has a boat shed at 150 Bowden Street, next to the public ferry wharf, and in the summer uses it for sailing and canoeing activities

== Demographics ==
In the 2021 Australian Bureau of Statistics Census of Population and Housing, the population of Meadowbank was 5,089 people. The population was 49.2% male, 50.8% female. 37.4% of people were born in Australia. The most common countries of birth were China 11.7%, South Korea 7.8%, India 6.1%, Philippines 3.7% and Hong Kong 2.8%. 38.2% of people only spoke English at home. Other languages spoken at home included Mandarin 13.2%, Korean 9.4%, Cantonese 6.4%, Hindi 2.3% and Nepali 2.2%. The most common responses for religion were No Religion 40.9%, Catholic 17.0%, Hinduism 8.1%, 5.2% of residents did not state their religion, and 5.1% of residents followed Buddhism.

96.8% of occupied private dwellings in Meadowbank were flats or apartments.

== Politics ==
State election
Liberal	998; 41.77% (25,431; 50.05%)
Labor	939; 39.30% (25,377; 49.95%)
The Greens NSW	350; 14.65%
Informed Medical Operations Party	37; 1.54%
Sustainable Australia Party	65; 2.72%

Federal election
Labor	1,131; 53.02% (1,509; 70.75%)
Liberal	502; 25.53% (624; 29.25%)
The Greens	337; 15.80%
Trumpet of Patriots	29; 1.36%
FUSION	40; 1.88%
Pauline Hanson's One Nation	38; 1.78%
Family First	40; 1.88%
HEART Party	16; 0.75%

The federal member for Bennelong is Jerome Laxale and the current state member for Ryde is Jordan Lane. The mayor of the local Ryde City Council is Sarkis Yedelian. The table contains first-preference votes for each candidate at a state and federal level with the results for the polling place located within Meadowbank for each column. Two-party-preferred results for the entire electorate are shown in brackets.
