= Smalls Creek =

River in New South Wales, Australia

Smalls

Location
- Country: Australia
- State: New South Wales
- Municipality: Sydney

Physical characteristics
- Source: Outlook Park and Darvall Park
  - location: Eastwood
  - coordinates: 33°47′43.836″S 151°4′55.1994″E
- Mouth: Parramatta River
  - location: Meadowbank Park, Meadowbank
  - coordinates: 33°49′6.96″S 151°5′2.0394″E

Basin features
- River system: Parramatta River

Smalls Creek, a northern tributary of the Parramatta River, is a creek west of Sydney Harbour, located in Sydney, New South Wales, Australia. It joins the Parramatta River at Meadowbank Park, Meadowbank.

== Ecology ==
The source of the creek is in the suburb of Eastwood. The Smalls Creek/Denistone catchment area is 218 hectares (540 acres).

The catchment rises near Second Avenue and Clanalpine Street in the north, is bounded by Adelaide Street and Bellevue Avenue to the west, Blaxland Road and Rydedale Road to the east, and discharges into the Parramatta River to the south. The Main Northern railway line crosses the catchment in the top north-east corner. The bulk of the catchment is drained by Smalls Creek. Smalls Creek is jointed by Mariam Creek which drains the north east corner. The catchment is predominantly residential with a large area of clustered commercial premises at the West Ryde Shopping Centre near the intersection of the railway line and Victoria Road. There are also large areas of open spaces in the form of recreational parklands and playing fields; the majority of these areas are in the northern part of the catchment.

== See also ==
- Charity Creek, Meadowbank
- Archer Creek, Meadowbank
