= Parramatta River =

River in Australia

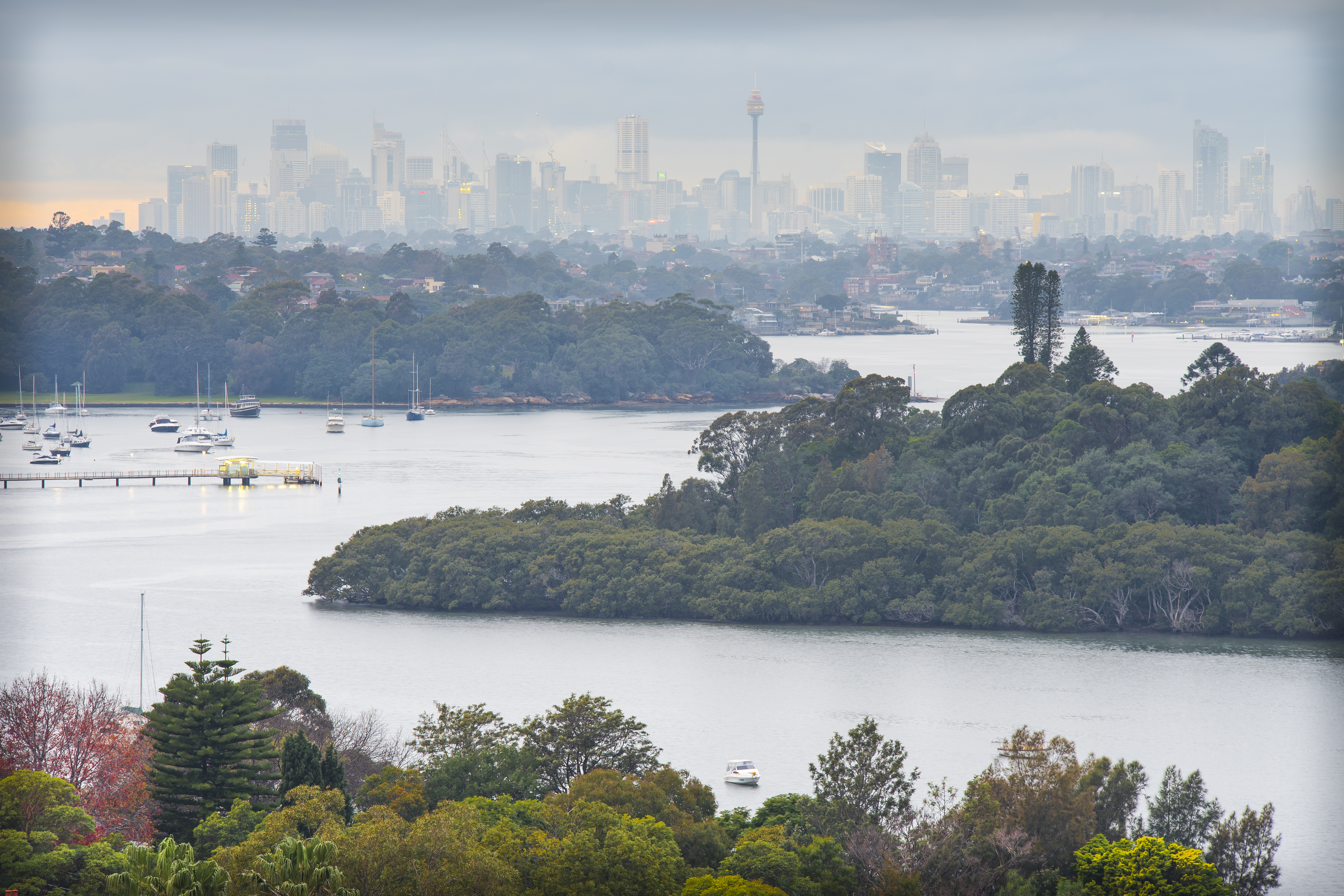
- Parramatta River as it heads to Port Jackson, with the Sydney CBD visible in the background

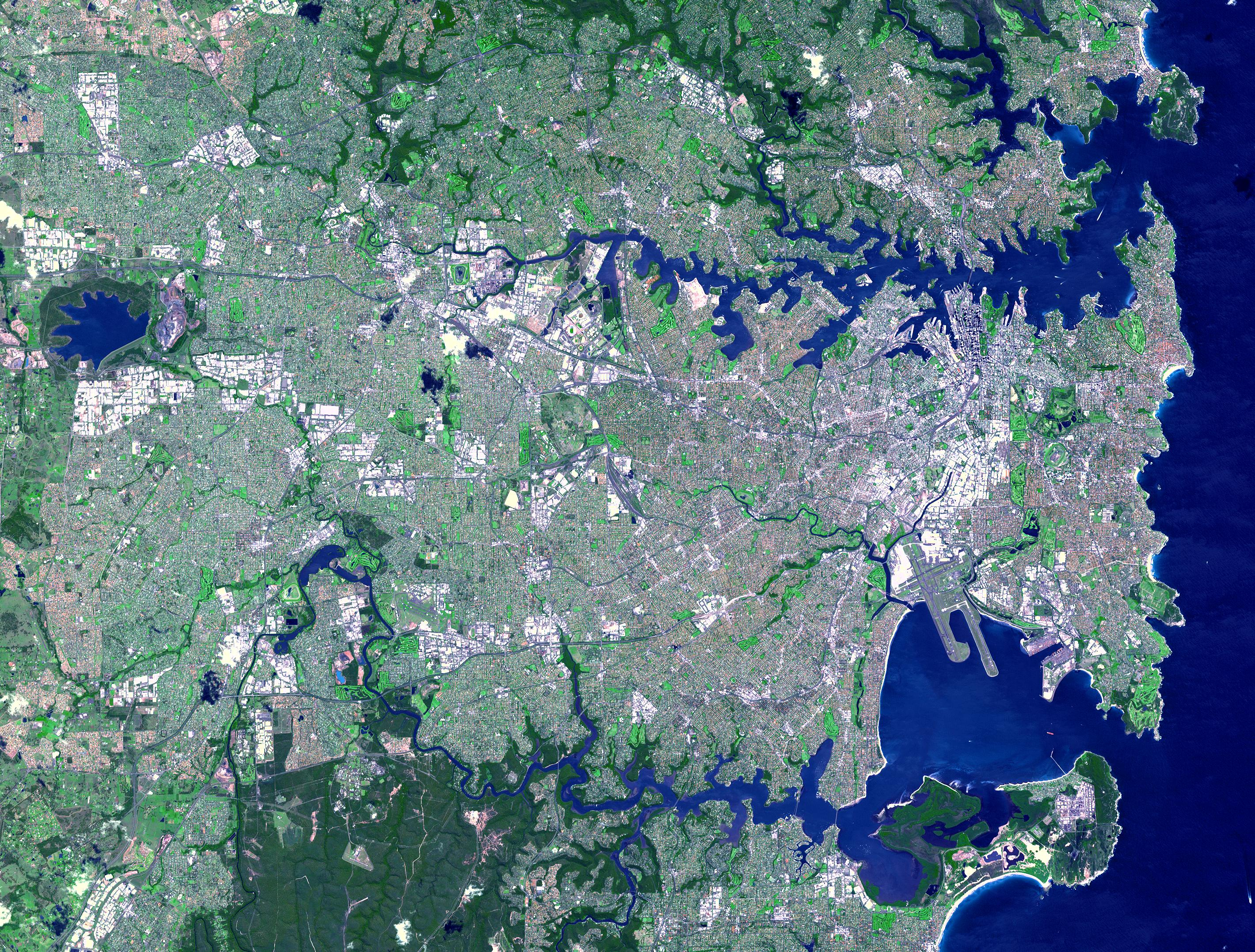
- NASA satellite view of Greater Metropolitan Sydney, with the location of the mouth of the Parramatta River, as it flows into Port Jackson, as marked
- Etymology: Burramattagal, meaning 'the head of the river' or 'the place where the eels sit down'

Location
- Country: Australia
- State: New South Wales
- LGAs: Parramatta, Ryde, Canada Bay, Hunter's Hill, Inner West

Physical characteristics
- Source: Toongabbie Creek
  - location: Old Toongabbie
  - coordinates: 33°47′56″S 150°59′47″E
- 2nd source: Darling Mills Creek
  - location: North Parramatta
- Mouth: Port Jackson
  - location: Greenwich and Birchgrove
  - coordinates: 33°50′41″S 151°10′55″E
- Length: 13.7 km (8.5 mi)
- Basin size: 252.4 km^{2} (97.5 sq mi)

Basin features
- Tributaries
  - left: Vineyard Creek, Ponds Subiaco Creek, Archer Creek, Smalls Creek, Charity Creek, Tarban Creek, Lane Cove River
  - right: Duck River, Haslams Creek, Powells Creek, Iron Cove Creek, Hawthorne Canal

The Parramatta River is an intermediate tide-dominated, drowned valley estuary located in Sydney, New South Wales, Australia. With an average depth of 5.1 metres (17 ft), the Parramatta River is the main tributary of Sydney Harbour, a branch of Port Jackson. Secondary tributaries include the smaller Lane Cove and Duck rivers.

Formed by the confluence of Toongabbie Creek and Darling Mills Creek at North Parramatta, the river flows in an easterly direction to a line between Yurulbin in Birchgrove and Manns Point in Greenwich. Here, it flows into Port Jackson, about 21 kilometres (13 mi) from the Tasman Sea. The total catchment area of the river is approximately 252.4 square kilometres (97.5 sq mi) and is tidal to Charles Street Weir in Parramatta, approximately 30 kilometres (19 mi) from the Sydney Heads.

The land adjacent to the Parramatta River was occupied for many thousands of years by Aboriginal peoples of the Wallumettagal nations and the Wangal, Toongagal (or Tugagal), Burramattagal, and Wategora clans of the Darug people. They used the river as an important source of food and a place for trade. The river was formed 15 to 29 million years ago as its waters began to cut a valley into sandstone and shale.

== History ==
The Parramatta River and its tributaries have been used by Aboriginal peoples for thousands of years. Several clans occupied its shores, including the Wangal along much of the southern bank, the Wallumettagal on the northern shore, and the Burramattagal around the upper river at present-day Parramatta. The river provided fish, eels, shellfish, waterbirds and other resources and also served as a transport route and territorial boundary. The name Parramatta derives from the name of the Burramattagal people and their country at the head of the river. It is commonly interpreted as meaning "the place where the eels lie down", referring to the eels associated with the upper reaches of the river.

In 1788, Governor Arthur Phillip explored the waterway while searching for fertile agricultural land and a reliable freshwater supply. For the early colony, the river was the principal transport route between Sydney and Parramatta. The first ferry, the Rose Hill Packet, began operating in 1789, carrying passengers and goods between the settlements. Although an overland route was established soon afterwards and the railway reached Parramatta in the nineteenth century, river transport remained important for much of the century.

European settlement substantially altered the river and its foreshores. Land clearing for agriculture increased sediment entering the waterway, while wetlands and saltmarshes were progressively drained or reclaimed. From the nineteenth century, industries including mills, tanneries and other factories developed along the river and its tributaries. Increasing urbanisation and industrialisation caused severe deterioration of the river during the nineteenth and twentieth centuries. Sewage, industrial effluent and other waste were discharged into the waterway, while sections of wetland were reclaimed and tributary streams modified or channelised. By the mid-20th century pollution had become sufficiently severe that fishing and many recreational activities had largely disappeared from parts of the river. Environmental regulation and remediation from the 1970s onwards gradually improved water quality. Major remediation occurred around Homebush Bay in preparation for the 2000 Summer Olympics, and former industrial waterfronts elsewhere along the river have subsequently been redeveloped for residential, recreational and conservation uses.

== Inflowing waterways ==
The headwaters of the Parramatta River are formed by the confluence of Darling Mills Creek and Toongabbie Creek (which has the tributary Greystanes Creek to the south). The point of the confluence lies on the northern border of the grounds of Cumberland Hospital. It also lies on the boundary of the suburbs of Westmead, Northmead, and North Parramatta.

Waterways flowing into the Parramatta River, west to east include:

- Vineyard Creek at Rydalmere, from the north
- Ponds Subiaco Creek at Rydalmere, from the north
- Duck River at Silverwater, from the south
- Archer Creek at Meadowbank, from the north
- Smalls Creek at Meadowbank, from the far north
- Charity Creek at Meadowbank, from the north
- Haslams Creek at Homebush Bay, from the south
- Powells Creek at Homebush Bay, from the south
- Iron Cove Creek at Five Dock, from the south
- Hawthorne Canal at Iron Cove, from the south
- Tarban Creek at Huntleys Point, from the north
- Lane Cove River at Greenwich, from the north

== The river in Parramatta ==
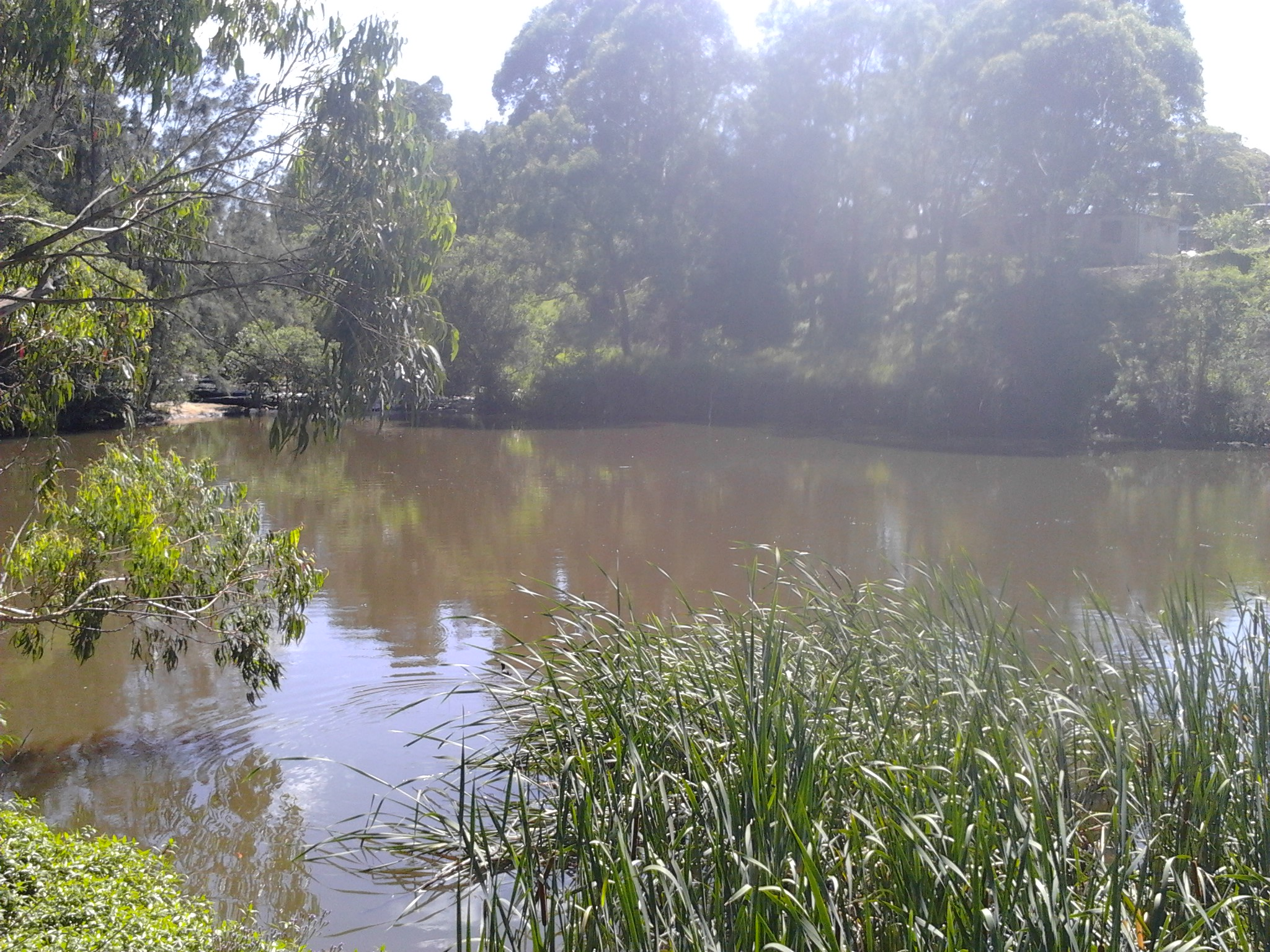
Headwaters of the Parramatta River

From its start at the confluence of Toongabbie Creek and Darling Mills Creek at North Parramatta, the river flows in a southerly direction through the grounds of Cumberland Hospital. Entering Parramatta Park, it then turns east and flows through the Parramatta CBD. Both banks are largely open to the public, with parkland and walkways, downstream to James Ruse Drive. The river is fed by a number of small creeks and stormwater drains.

The waters are controlled by a series of weirs: the weir at the edge of the hospital grounds, the Kiosk Weir in Parramatta Park, the Marsden Street Weir, and the Charles Street Weir at the ferry wharf. The weirs have been equipped with fish ladders. Kiosk Weir and Charles Street Weir also include footbridges enabling a crossing of the river.

Historically, the river was dammed to provide reservoirs for the town. Currently, however, the function of the weirs is aesthetic, preventing the water from draining away during dry periods. As a consequence the river floods in heavy rain, particularly at the Charles Street Weir. The Charles Street Weir forms the boundary between fresh water and salt water, and is also the limit of tides.

== River governance ==
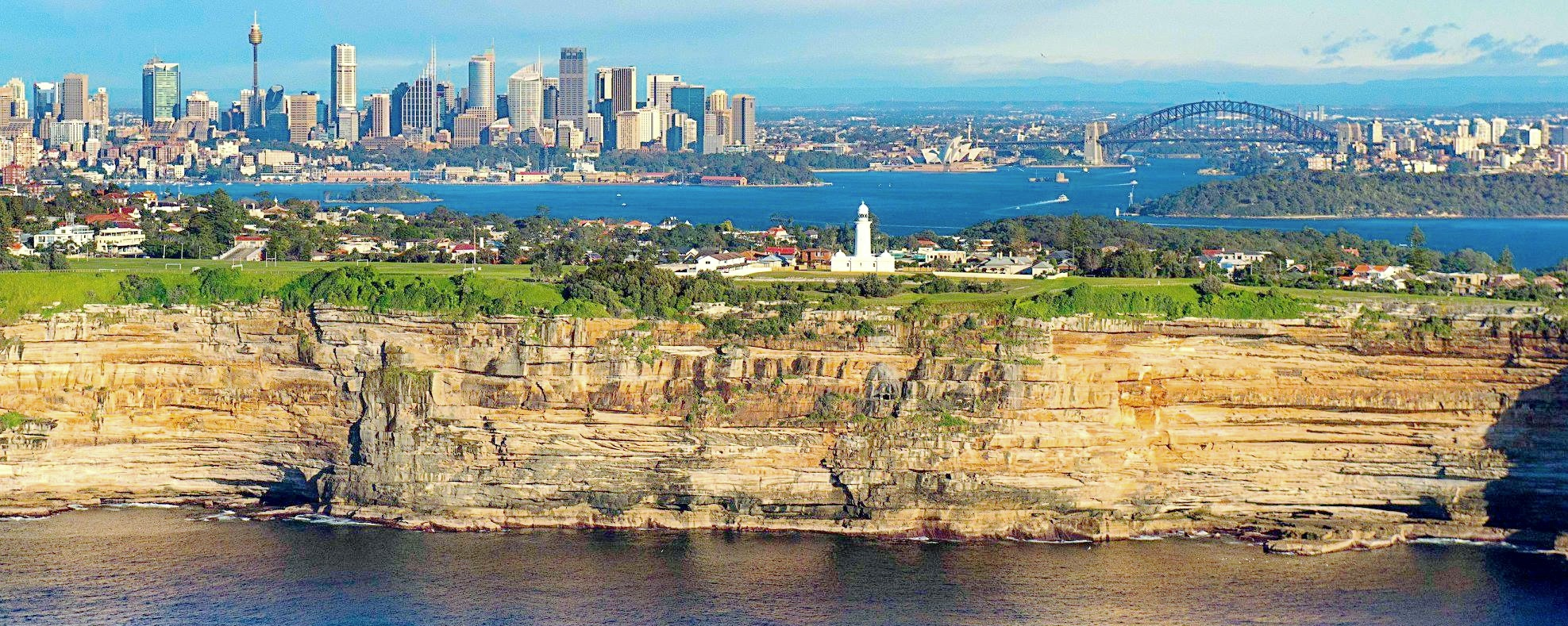
The outflow of Parramatta River into Tasman Sea.

The whole of Sydney Harbour including its tributary rivers is subject to a long range Catchment Management Plan. The Government has almost eliminated local representation by eliminating the former local catchment management boards.

The New South Wales Government has a documented policy in relation to access to the harbour and river foreshores, including public access to intertidal lands where landowners have absolute waterfronts but where the waterfront is exposed at low tide. Moorings and jetties are the responsibility of Transport for NSW, who are also responsible for the management of the harbour and river seabed. Many bays contain swing moorings, mostly privately owned, but some associated with commercial marinas.

Along the Parramatta River many hands have made lighter work, in the community-wide effort to make the entire river swimmable again by 2025, starting with the opening of Lake Parramatta in 2014. 13 councils sit within the Parramatta River catchment group and all have committed to tackling the two major polluters: sewer overflows and stormwater.

== Transport ==
=== Ferry services and wharves ===
There are River Cat services along the Parramatta River to Circular Quay. The main wharves, west–to–east are:

Wharf name	Suburb	Location on side of river	Image
Parramatta ferry wharf	Parramatta	Southern	
Rydalmere ferry wharf	Rydalmere	Northern	
Sydney Olympic Park ferry wharf	Wentworth Point	Southern	
Meadowbank ferry wharf	Meadowbank	Northern	
Kissing Point ferry wharf	Kissing Point	Northern	
Cabarita ferry wharf	Cabarita Park	Southern	
Abbotsford ferry wharf	Abbotsford	Southern	
Chiswick ferry wharf	Chiswick	Southern	
Huntleys Point ferry wharf	Gladesville	Northern	

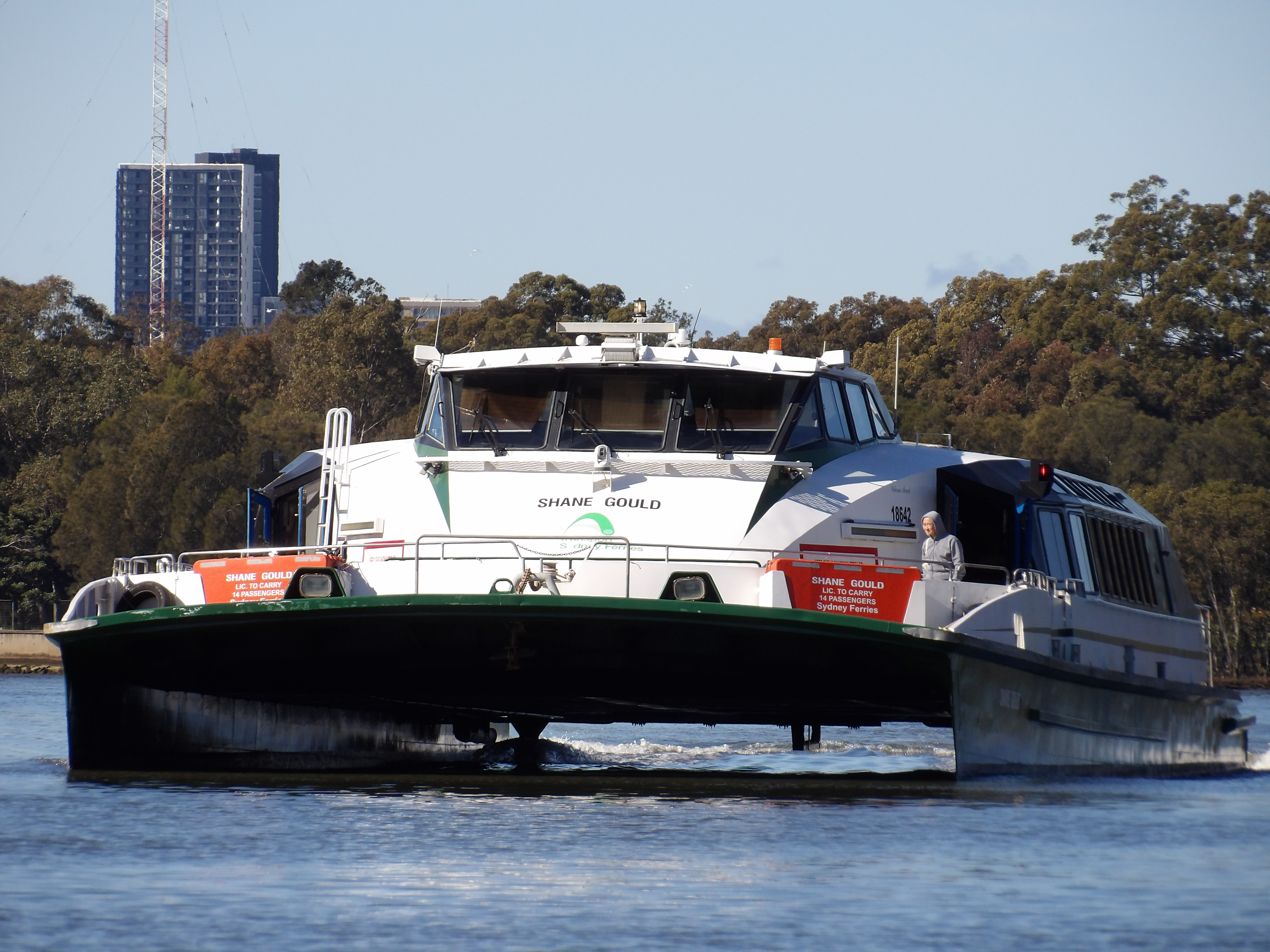
A RiverCat class ferry cruising up the Parramatta River at Rydalmere

=== Crossings ===
The Parramatta River, along with Sydney Harbour, is the most significant waterway in Sydney. Since settlement, the river and the harbour have presented a formidable barrier between the early–European settled southern Farm Cove precinct, to development north of the waterway. Together, Parramatta River and Port Jackson literally cut Sydney in half along its north–south axis.

As a result, the many crossings are extremely important to the life of the city. From west to east, the crossings of the Parramatta River are located at:

Crossing name (Unofficial name)	Southern crossing location	Northern crossing location	Comments/use	Image
Bridge Road	Westmead	North Parramatta	Carries vehicular traffic.	
Bridge Road	Westmead	North Parramatta	New bridge constructed directly adjacent to Bridge Road for Parramatta Light Rail. Carries Light Rail and shared path.	
Ross Street Weir	Parramatta		Carries vehicles. Restricted Access	
Buttons Bridge	Parramatta		Carries bicycle and foot traffic in Parramatta park.	
Noller Bridge	Parramatta		Carries bicycle and foot traffic in Parramatta park.	
Rings Bridge	Parramatta		A bridge which carries vehicular and pedestrian traffic north–south along O'Connell Street.	
Marsden Street Weir	Parramatta		Formerly carried Marsden Street, but was replaced for this purpose in 1971 due to frequent flooding. Remains connected to Marsden Street on one side, but with restricted access	
Bernie Banton Bridge	Parramatta		A multi-span concrete girder bridge which carries vehicular and pedestrian traffic north–south along Marsden Street. Originally built in 1971 to replace the frequently flooded Marsden Street Weir, the bridge was named the Marsden Street Bridge. The bridge was then renamed in 2006 in honour of the asbestos diseases campaigner Bernie Banton.	
Lennox Bridge	Parramatta		A stone arch bridge designed by David Lennox and constructed with convict labour between 1836 and 1839. Formerly carried the Castle Hill Tramway until 1919. Carries Church Street. Carried vehicular traffic north–south along Church Street until 2019. Now carries Parramatta Light Rail and pedestrians	
Barry Wilde Bridge	Parramatta		Carries a car lane, a bus lane and a footpath on either side of the bridge as Wilde Avenue	
Elizabeth Street Footbridge	Parramatta		A pedestrian bridge incorporating Wake, an artwork by Milne and Stonehouse	
Charles Street Weir	Parramatta		Carries foot traffic. Allows access to Parramatta Ferry Wharf	
The Macarthur Bridge (Gasworks Bridge)	Parramatta		Completed in 1885, this is an historic iron lattice bridge named for the gasworks which used to be situated nearby. Carries vehicular and foot traffic as Macarthur Street	
Arthur Street Bridge	Parramatta		Completed in 2023, carries pedestrian and Bicycle traffic. First diagonal arch bridge in Australia. Connects Arthur Street to the Parramatta Valley cycleway.	
James Ruse Drive bridge	Parramatta		A concrete span road bridge that carries vehicular traffic north–south along James Ruse Drive. Also carries pedestrian Traffic.	
	Camellia	Rydalmere	Carries water pipes, adjacent to former rail bridge.	
Carlingford railway bridge (Camellia Railway Bridge)	Camellia	Rydalmere	Formerly carried the Carlingford railway line. Converted into an active transport link as part of Parramatta Light Rail With adjacent water pipe bridge on the Carlingford railway line	
	Camellia	Rydalmere	New bridge constructed to carry duplicated Parramatta Light Rail, replacing the former rail bridge.	
Thackeray Street Bridge	Camellia	Rydalmere	A pedestrian bridge. Also carries water pipes. Connects to the Parramatta Valley cycleway.	
Silverwater Bridge	Silverwater	Rydalmere	A concrete span road bridge that carries vehicular traffic north–south along Silverwater Road, opened in 1962. Also carries pedestrian traffic	
John Whitton Bridge	Rhodes	Meadowbank	A railway bridge carrying the Main Northern railway line	
Meadowbank Railway Bridge	Rhodes	Meadowbank	carried the Main Northern railway line until superseded in 1980, converted for pedestrian and cyclist use	
Ryde Bridge	Rhodes	Ryde	A dual bridge that carries vehicular and pedestrian traffic north–south along Concord Road	
Mortlake Ferry (Putney Punt)	Mortlake	Putney	A cable ferry that carries vehicular and passenger traffic north–south, operating since 1928	
Gladesville Bridge	Drummoyne (south–east)	Huntleys Point (north–west)	Completed in 1964, this single span concrete arch bridge carries vehicular traffic east–west along Victoria Road. The existing bridge replaced the Parramatta River Bridge, erected in 1881, carrying both vehicles and trams. Also carries pedestrian traffic	

== Ecological and environment ==
=== Water quality concerns ===
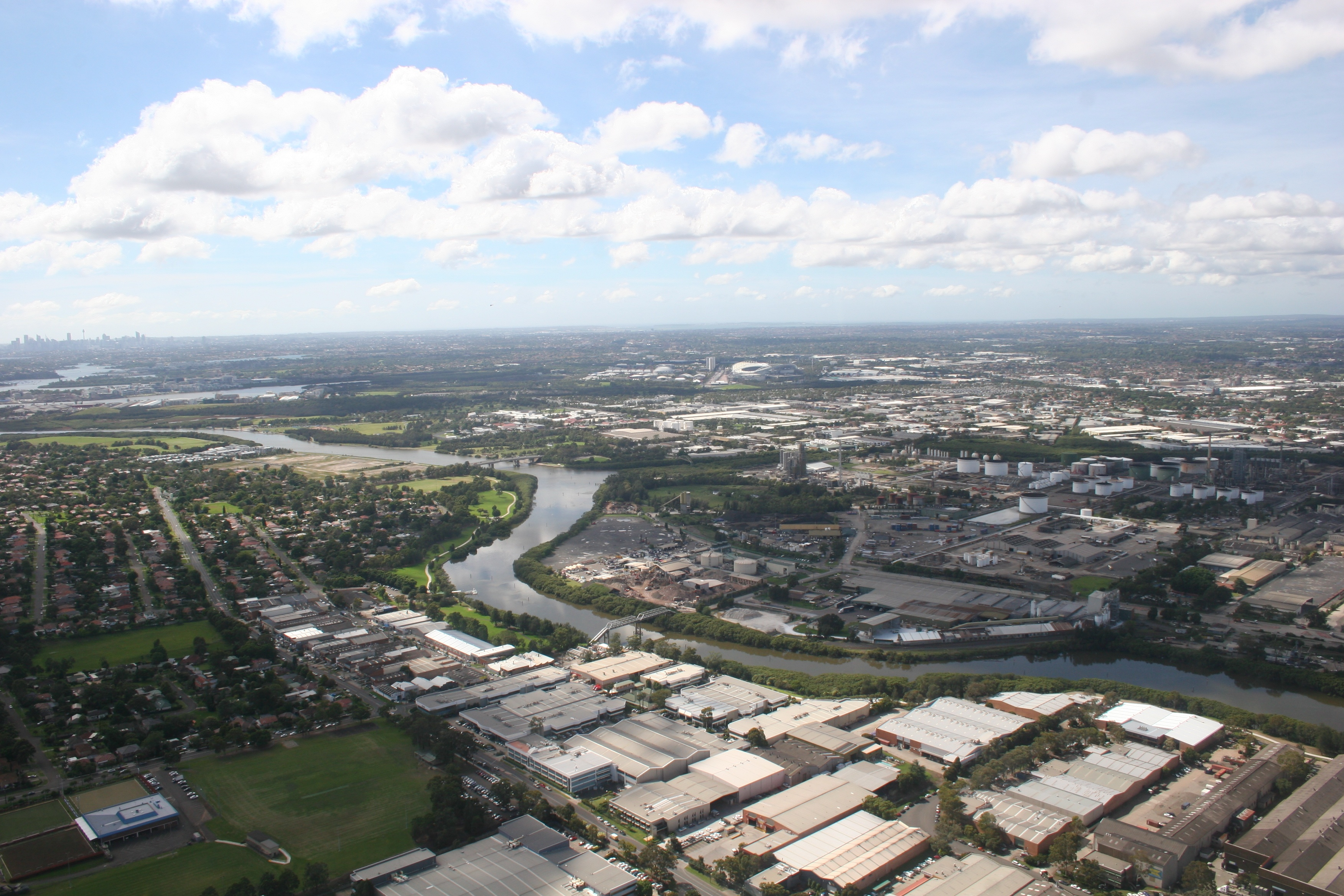
Industrial uses adjacent to the river at Camellia and Rosehill.

Until 1970 the river was an open drain for Sydney's industry and consequently the southern central embayments are contaminated with a range of heavy metals and chemicals. The Northern Bays are less affected as the Sydney Harbour Bridge was not completed until 1932 and so industrial development was already well established on the southern side of the harbour.

Gavin Birch of the University of Sydney has published a number of papers which show that Sydney Harbour is as contaminated as most other harbours in industrialised cities, that the main sediment contamination is in the southern central embayments (Blackwattle to Homebush Bays), that there are five particularly contaminated areas of Sydney Harbour, and that four of them are in the Parramatta river system.

The main contaminated areas of the Parramatta River are:

- Homebush Bay — dioxins, lead, phthalates, DDT, PAHs (coal tars) mainly originating from nearby chemical factories of Berger Paints, CSR Chemicals, ICI/Orica, and Union Carbide.
- Iron Cove — various metals and chemicals with no clearly defined point source. Pollution may possibly enter through Iron Cove Creek and Hawthorne Canal.
- Adjacent to the former AGL site, now redeveloped as Breakfast Point.

Water quality is monitored by the Office of Environment and Heritage (New South Wales) (OEH) for faecal coliforms and e. coli, but only as far west as Cabarita. OEH does not monitor water quality further west on the river, despite increasing development and the use of the river for recreational boating. In the areas monitored, the water quality is generally acceptable except after heavy rains.

=== Fishing ===
The Parramatta River is subject to a number of fishing bans because of its contaminated sediments. There is a complete fishing ban in Homebush Bay because of the dioxin contamination. In 2006, the NSW Government imposed a complete commercial fishing ban throughout the rest of Sydney Harbour and its tributaries, including the Parramatta River west of the Harbour Bridge, which remained in place until 2011.

The Parramatta River is one of the few significant coastal rivers in New South Wales which has not been the subject of an investigation by the Healthy Rivers Commission. The Cooks River and Botany Bay have been subject to such an investigation. Some have campaigned for a Healthy Rivers Commission inquiry to bring together all the information on the state of the river and its sediments and fish and assist in watershed management.

=== Major wetlands and environmentally sensitive areas ===
Major wetlands include:

- Bicentennial Park Wetlands (nationally significant, JAMBA CAMBA)
- Newington Wetlands (nationally significant, JAMBA CAMBA)

There are significant stands of mangroves along the river west of Henley (on the river's northern shore) and Mortlake (on the river's southern shore) and in the Lane Cove River. The mangroves have actually colonised areas that were previously salt marsh. Research into historical drawings and writings indicates that the mangroves were far fewer at English colonisation. Council information panels in Glades Bay explain that the bay's now extensive mangrove stands would once have been open water, sandy beaches and outcrops of rock. Land clearing and development has allowed soil and various nutrients to be washed into the river. This has provided an ideal environment for mangroves to colonise. The excessive siltation of the river is an ongoing problem.

=== Reclamation ===
Many areas of the river, particularly the swampy heads of bays, have been reclaimed, often being used as rubbish dumps before being converted into playing fields. Large sections of Meadowbank Park were created in this manner. Some industrial sites were also reclaimed heavily from the river, particularly in Homebush Bay. Most creeks leading into the bays have been channelised (lined with concrete walls and floor).

=== Remediation ===
While some areas of the river with heavily contaminated sediments have not been remediated, there is significant remediation of sediments about to start in Homebush Bay. These include the dioxin contaminated sediments near the former Union Carbide plant and the lead contaminated sediments near the former Berger Paints plant. The former AGL site has been analysed, a remediation plan developed and approved, remediation completed and construction commenced on medium to high density residential development, but the sediments, which independent research shows to be contaminated with pollutants from the AGL operations, have not yet had the investigation stage finalised (as of 2000).

Other areas have had sediments covered with concrete to prevent the fish eating the benthos. Some of these companies claim that the contamination is best left alone, but environmentalists have argued that the contamination could be being passed up the food chain and claim that the companies are trying to avoid the costs incurred in pollution cleanup.

During the Vietnam War, the chemical Agent Orange was produced near the Parramatta River. The last remnants of this chemical were cleaned in 2010.

== Recreational activities ==
=== Sailing ===
There are a number of sailing and yachting clubs on the River:

- Abbotsford 12 ft Flying Squadron in Abbotsford
- Concord & Ryde Sailing Club at Putney
- Parramatta River Sailing Club at Gladesville

Sailing and rowing take place under an aquatic licence granted annually by Transport for NSW.

=== Sea Scouts ===
There are Sea Scouts at:

- Rhodes: First Yaralla
- Meadowbank: Epping Scout Group has a boat shed at 150 Bowden Street, next to the public ferry wharf, and in the summer uses it for sailing and canoeing activities

=== Rowing ===
The river has a long historical association with rowing. There is a monument in honour of Henry Searle, a champion sculler of his day, in the river at Henley.

Some of the school rowing sheds are:

- MLC School
- The King's School
- Sydney Boys High School
- Newington College
- The Scots College
- Sydney Grammar School
- Shore School

There are also a number of rowing clubs:

- Leichhardt Rowing Club, Drummoyne Rowing Club and UTS Haberfield within Iron Cove.
- Glebe Rowing Club in Blackwattle Bay.
- Sydney Rowing Club at Abbotsford Point.
- Balmain Rowing Club at Balmain
- UNSW Boat Club in Tarban Creek.
- SGHS Rowing Club also in Tarban Creek

While a number of regattas are still held on the river each year, mainly in Iron Cove and Hen and Chicken Bay, many of the major regattas are now held at the Sydney International Regatta Centre (SIRC), adjacent to the Nepean River, where rowing was held for the 2000 Summer Olympics. Early GPS Schoolboy Head of the River races were held on the Parramatta River before moving to the Nepean River and later SIRC.

Most rowing training is done in the middle to upper reaches of the river between Abbotsford and Homebush Bay because there is less water traffic and therefore less waves and more protection from wind. Rowing also takes place in the Lane Cove River and Iron Cove which have less traffic.

=== Foreshore walks and cycleways ===
Much of the foreshore is still in the hands of industry and private individuals as residences, however there is an increasing amount of waterfront land available as foreshore reserve with walkways and cycleways. As former industrial sites undergo remediation and redevelopment, the foreshores are opened up for public access. Where there is no foreshore access, cycleways are routed through quiet residential streets with clearly marked sections of the road reserved for cyclists.

Major foreshore parks include:

- Cabarita Park
- Kissing Point Park, Ryde
- Meadowbank Park
- Putney Park
- George Kendall Riverside Park, Ermington
- Bicentennial Park, Homebush Bay
- Millennium Parklands, Homebush/Auburn

=== Heritage items ===
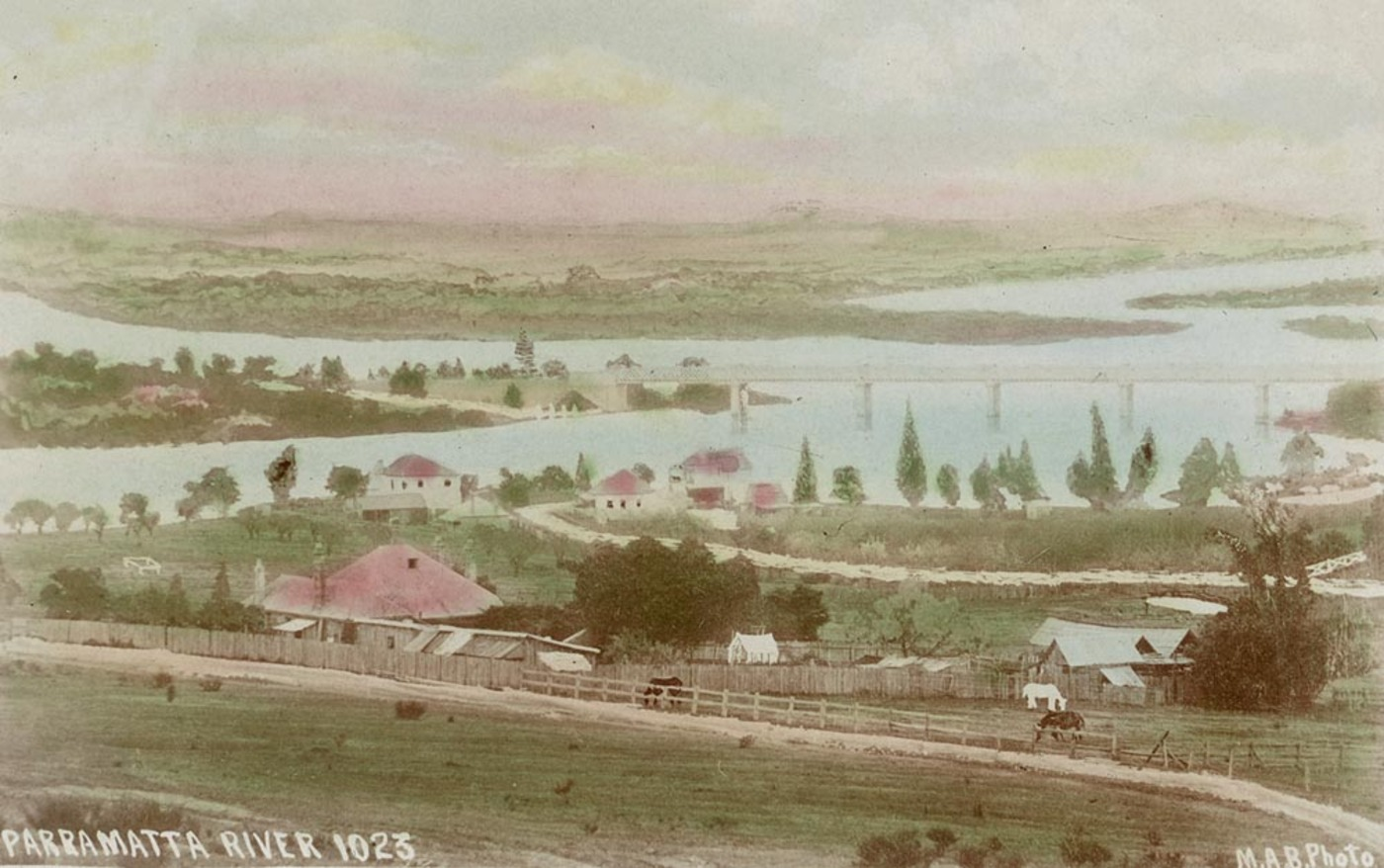
The river in the early 20th century

Major heritage buildings, all listed on the Register of the National Estate, on or near the foreshore include:

- Thomas Walker Convalescent Hospital (now Rivendell Child, Adolescent and Family Unit), was designed by Sir John Sulman and built in 1891–93.
- Callan Park, a former psychiatric hospital, with fine sandstone buildings designed by James Barnet in 1877.
- Gladesville Mental Hospital, with sandstone buildings in park-like surroundings, designed by Mortimer Lewis in 1836.
- Yaralla, the Italianate mansion of Thomas Walker and his daughter Dame Eadith Walker, generous benefactors of the Concord community, now functions as Dame Eadith Walker Hospital. It was built in the late 1860s, with later extensions by Sir John Sulman.
- Newington House, a Regency home built in 1832 by John Blaxland. In 1863, the property was acquired by the Wesleyans and turned into Newington College. In 1887 it became part of Silverwater State Hospital, and later became an administrative block in Silverwater Correctional Complex.
- The SS Ayrfield, an above-water, tree-covered shipwreck at Homebush Bay.

== Gallery ==
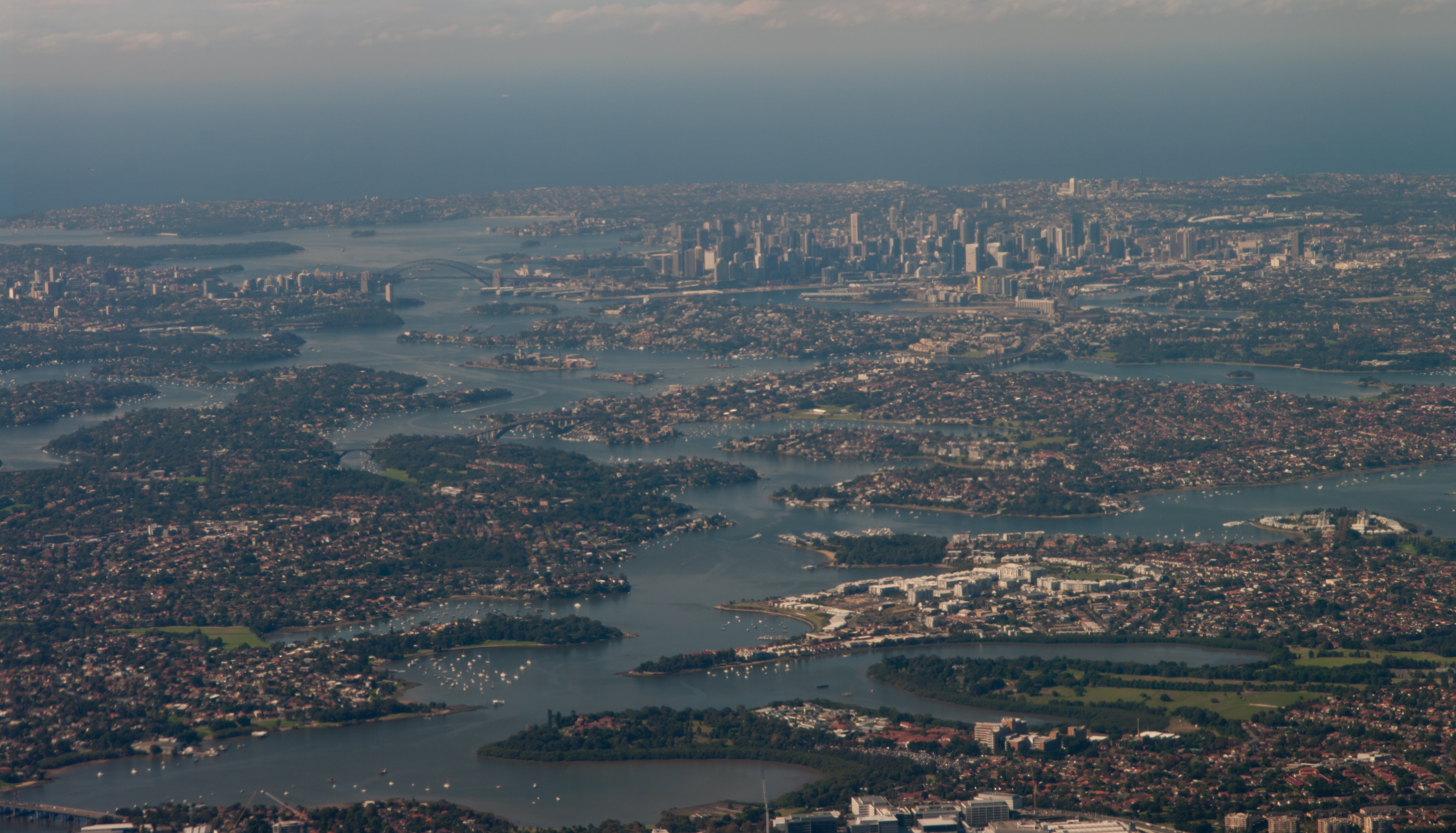
Aerial view across the mouth of the river as it reaches in Port Jackson

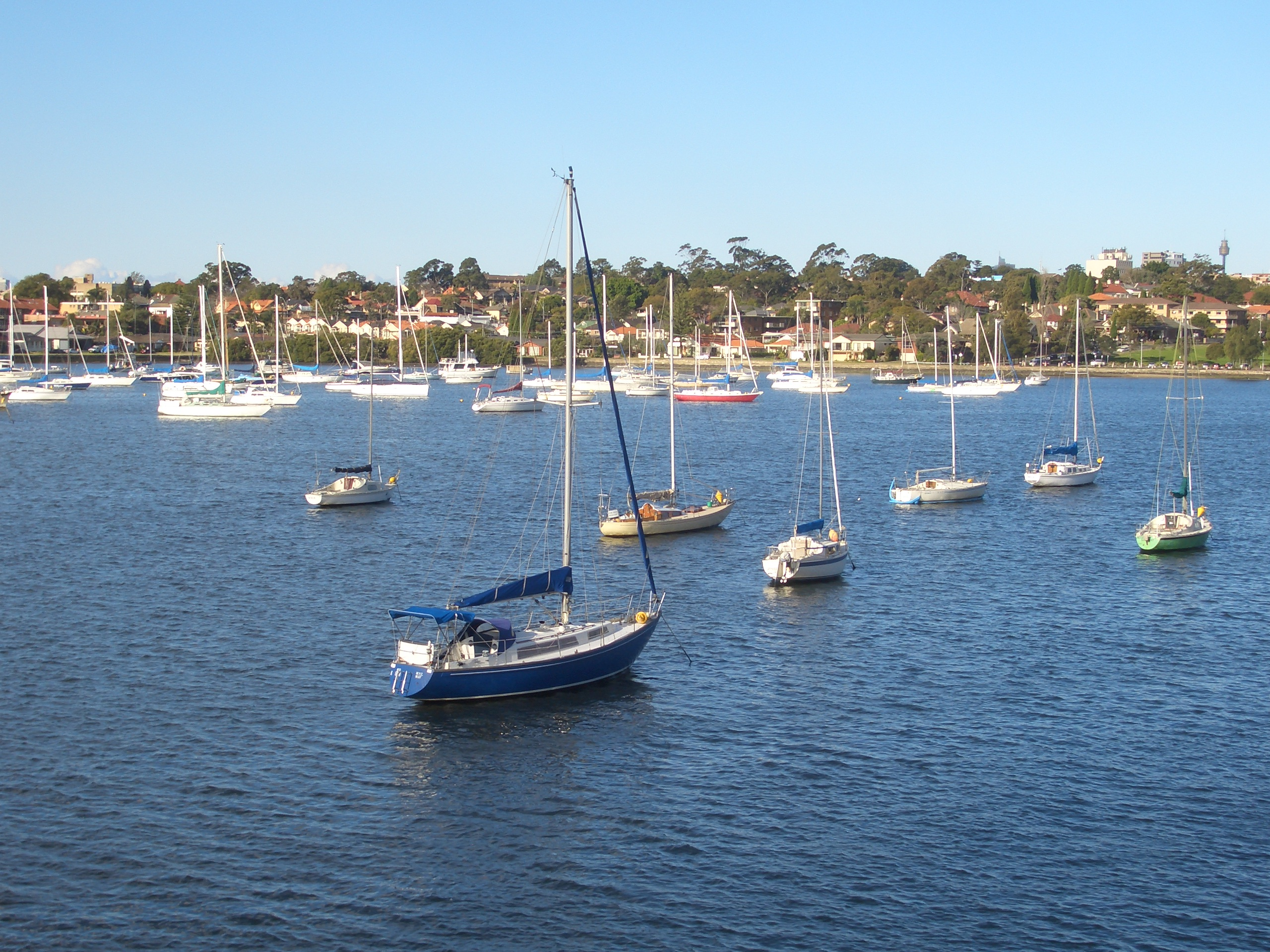
Parramatta River at Five Dock Bay, Drummoyne

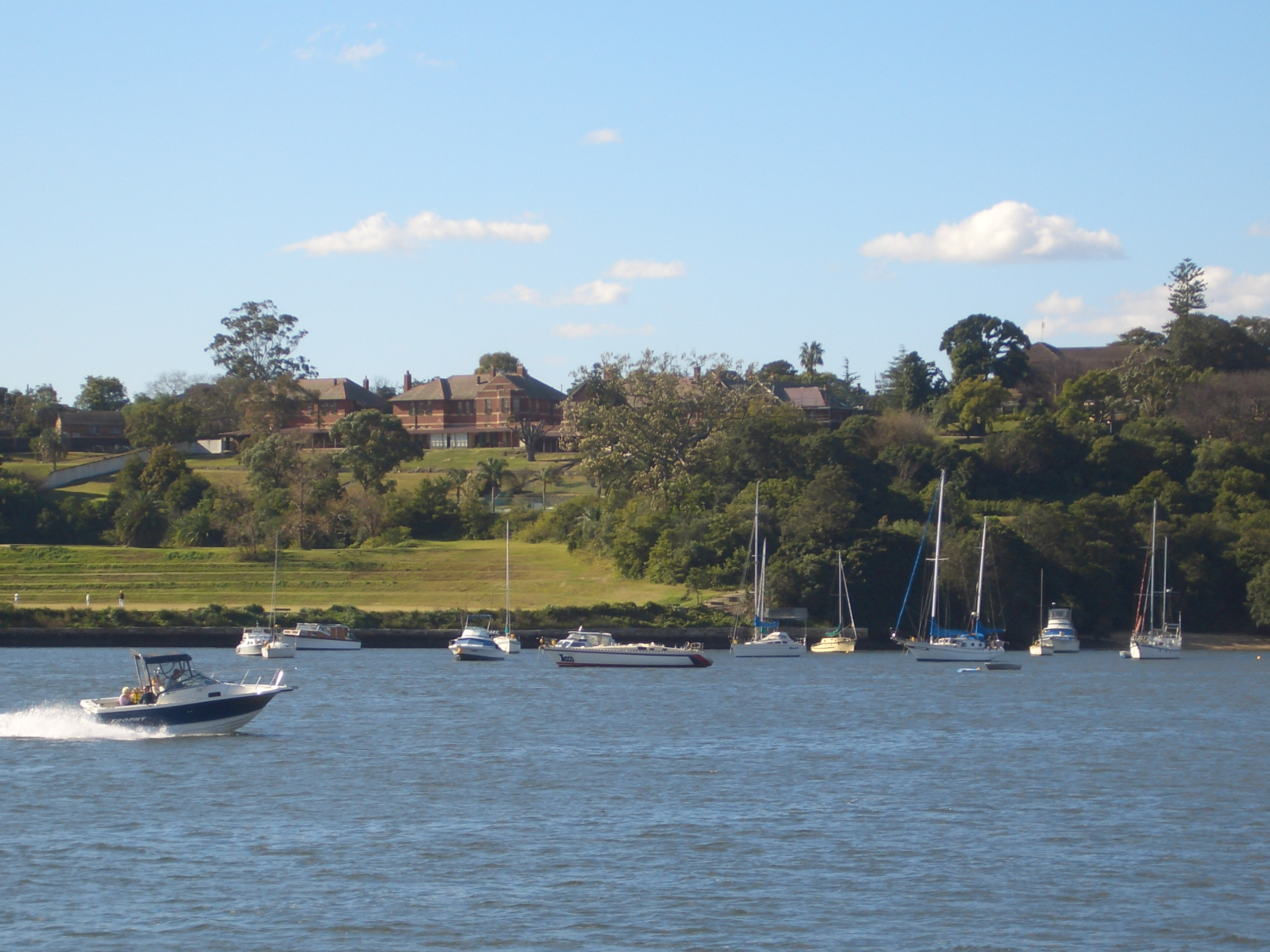
Parramatta River at Gladesville

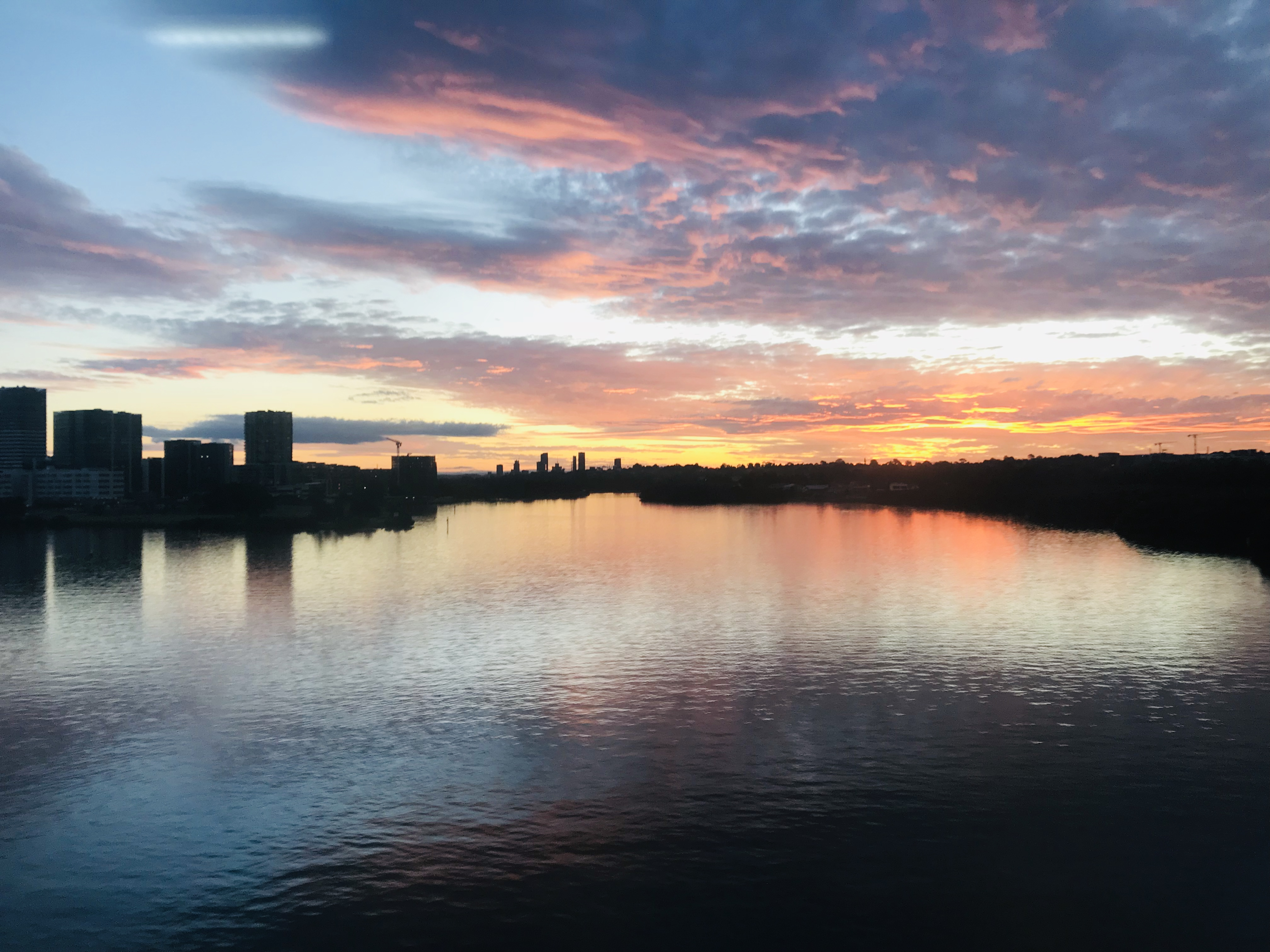
Sunset on the Parramatta River seen from John Whitton Bridge, Meadowbank

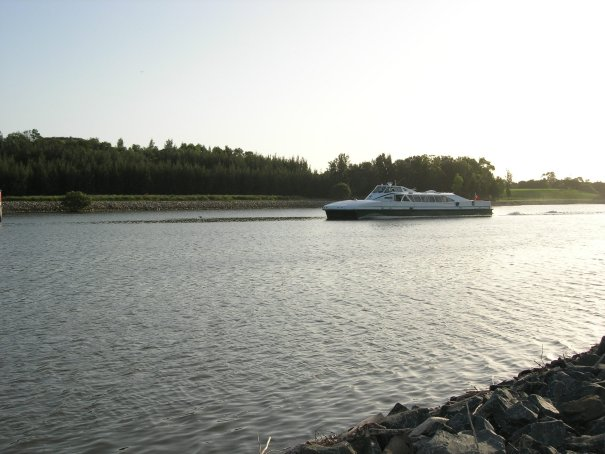
Parramatta River at Ermington

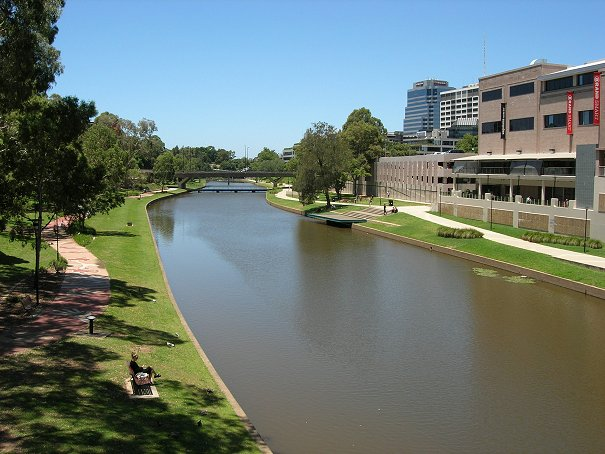
Parramatta River at Parramatta

== See also ==
- List of rivers of New South Wales (L-Z)
- Rivers of New South Wales
- Geography of Sydney
- Guide to Sydney Rivers site
