= Beforepay Group =

Australian fintech organisation headquartered in Sydney

Beforepay Group Limited is an Australian fintech organisation headquartered in Sydney. Founded in 2019, the group operates Beforepay, which offers Pay Advance and Personal Loan products to Australian consumers, and Carrington Labs, which provides credit risk modelling and cash flow analytics to banks and other lenders. The company has been listed on the Australian Securities Exchange (ASX) since January 2022 under the ticker B4P. Beforepay offers short-term loans through its Pay Advance product and larger loans through its Personal Loan product.

Carrington Labs provides custom credit risk models and cash flow underwriting analytics to banks and other lenders. It commercialises technology developed for Beforepay’s consumer lending operations.

== History ==
Beforepay was founded in Sydney in 2019 by Tarek Ayoub and Dean Mao under the name Cheq. The early app offered advances of up to A$200, charged a 5% fee, and linked to customers' bank accounts to collect repayments when wages arrived.

The business adopted the Beforepay brand in 2020. By November 2020, Beforepay had more than 100,000 registered users and an A$4 million funding round led by Vocus founder James Spenceley. In January 2021, the company raised a further A$9 million in a pre-IPO round led by Alium Capital.

The parent company changed its name from Cheq Limited to Beforepay Group Limited in May 2021. That month, Jamie Twiss, a former Westpac executive, succeeded Ayoub as chief executive officer. In July 2021, Brian Hartzer, former chief executive officer of Westpac, was appointed chairman.

Beforepay Group had a net loss after tax of approximately A$18.8 million for the financial year ended 30 June 2021. By November 2021, it had advanced A$170 million to customers. That month, the company lodged a prospectus for an initial public offering (IPO), seeking to raise approximately A$35 million at A$3.41 per share.

The company began trading on the ASX on 17 January 2022 following the A$35 million IPO. Its shares closed their first trading day at A$1.905, approximately 44% below the offer price.

In March 2024, the group launched Carrington Labs to commercialise credit risk models and technology developed for its own lending business. The group recorded its first full-year profit in the financial year ended 30 June 2024, with net profit after tax of approximately A$3.9 million.

In August 2024, subsidiary BPG Credit obtained an Australian Credit Licence. In October 2024, the group launched its Personal Loan product, offering larger loans with longer repayment periods. In the same year, Beforepay Group received the Ethical Lender of the Year – APAC award in Wealth & Finance International's Ethical Finance Awards.

For the financial year ended 30 June 2026, Beforepay Group had revenue of A$50.6 million, up 26% on the previous year, and statutory net profit after tax of A$8.2 million, up 22%. The company also reported cash net profit after tax (cash NPAT) of A$15.7 million, up 57%.

On 19 August 2026, Beforepay announced that it had reached two million registered users.

== Operations ==
Beforepay Group operates two businesses: Beforepay, which provides consumer lending in Australia, and Carrington Labs, which provides credit risk modelling and cash flow analytics to banks and other lenders.

=== Beforepay ===
Beforepay offers consumer lending through its Pay Advance and Personal Loan products via a digital platform. Pay Advance provides short-term loans of up to A$2,000, while Personal Loan offers larger loans of up to A$5,000 with repayment periods of up to 12 months.

Pay Advance accounts for most of the group's lending volume. In FY2026, Pay Advance originations totalled approximately A$946.4 million. Personal Loan advances reached A$16.9 million, compared with approximately A$2 million in FY2025.

In 2024, Beforepay was named Ethical Lender of the Year – Australia in the Pan Finance Awards. Beforepay's Pay Advance product also won Overall Digital Lending Product of the Year at the 2026 FinTech Breakthrough Awards.

=== Carrington Labs ===
Carrington Labs is Beforepay Group's international business-to-business credit analytics business. It provides custom credit risk models as a service, alongside cash flow underwriting analytics, to banks and other lenders. Its clients include banks and specialist lenders worldwide.

Carrington Labs uses technology originally built for Beforepay's consumer lending business. It builds and maintains credit models for each lender, based on that lender's own data and risk settings. The models are used for credit assessment, loan pricing and portfolio monitoring, and connect to a lender's existing systems through an API or batch processing. Carrington Labs also monitors and retrains the models over time. It does not make lending decisions; each lender sets its own credit policies and decides on approvals and loan terms.

== Regulation ==
At the time of its ASX listing in 2022, Beforepay's Pay Advance product operated under the National Credit Code's short-term credit exemption, outside the credit licensing and responsible-lending requirements applicable to regulated consumer loans.

Consumer advocates have called for stronger regulation of wage-advance services, citing concerns about repeat borrowing and affordability. Beforepay has expressed support for industry minimum standards and compulsory membership of the Australian Financial Complaints Authority (AFCA).

In August 2024, the group's subsidiary BPG Credit obtained an Australian Credit Licence, enabling it to offer regulated credit products. Its Personal Loan product is regulated under the National Consumer Credit Protection Act 2009. AFCA's Financial Firm Search lists BPG Credit Pty Ltd as a member, with a joining date of 23 August 2024.
