= 2024 North Sydney Council election =

- 14 September 2024

All 10 seats on North Sydney Council 6 seats needed for a majority
- Registered: 49,176
- Turnout: 79.8%

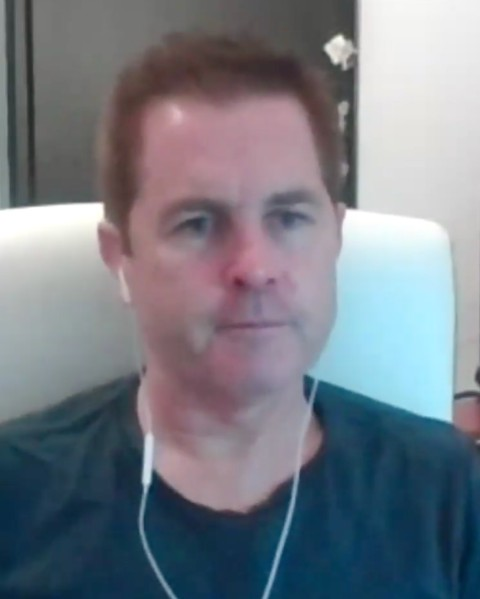

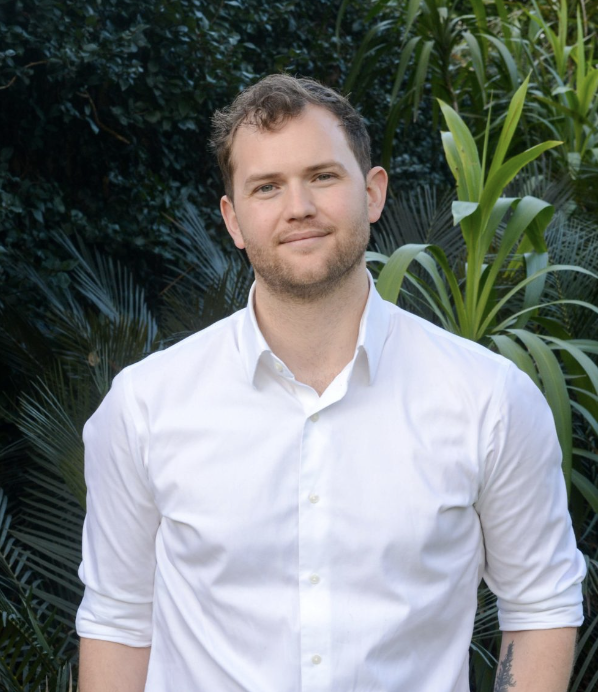
	First party	Second party	Third party
	REAL
Leader	Zoë Baker & MaryAnn Beregi	Jessica Keen	N/A
Party	Real Independents	Liberal	Labor
Leader's seat	St Leonards & Cammeraygal	Cammeraygal (won seat)	N/A
Last election	2 seats	Did not contest	2 seats
Seats won	4	2	2
Seat change	▲2	▲2	Steady
Primary vote	11,825	6,084	5,981
Percentage	32.2%	16.5%	16.3%
	Fourth party	Fifth party	Sixth party
	IND
Leader	N/A	William Bourke	Angus Hoy
Party	Independents	Sustainable	Greens
Leader's seat	N/A	St Leonards (lost seat)	Cammeraygal (won seat)
Last election	1 seat	2 seats	Did not contest
Seats won	1	0	1
Seat change	Steady	▼2	▲1
Primary vote	4,708	3,308	2,304
Percentage	12.8%	9.0%	6.3%
- Results by ward

An election for North Sydney Council was held on 14 September 2024 to elect twelve councillors. The election was held as part of the statewide local government elections in New South Wales.

The Real Independents doubled its seats to four, while the Liberal Party and the Labor Party won two seats each.

== Electoral system ==
Like in all other New South Wales local government areas (LGAs), North Sydney Council elections use optional preferential voting. Under this system, voters are only required to vote for one candidate or group, although they can choose to preference other candidates.

All elections for councillor positions are elected using proportional representation. North Sydney has an Australian Senate-style ballot paper with above-the-line and below-the-line voting. The council is divided into two wards, each electing five councillors.

The election was conducted by the New South Wales Electoral Commission (NSWEC).

== Retiring councillors ==
=== Team Jilly ===
- Jilly Gibson – announced 14 August 2024

== Candidates ==
On 14 August 2024, the day that candidates nominations closed, the Liberal Party revealed they had missed the deadline to nominate 164 candidates in 16 different LGAs. This included all Liberal candidates in St Leonards Ward.

The Liberals were endorsing candidates for North Sydney Council for the first time at this election and remained on the ballot in Cammeraygal Ward, where its ticket was led by former CommUnity 1st councillor Jessica Keen.

Councillors Zoë Baker and MaryAnn Beregi led "The Real Independents" group. Sustainable Australia councillor William Bourke contested the election in the second position on the party's St Leonards Ward ticket.

=== Cammeraygal ===
Sustainable Australia (Group A)	Real Independents (Group B)	Greens (Group C)	Labor (Group D)
1. Sarah Kok; 2. Bob Eggleton; 3. Peter Moor; 4. Mark Marsi; 5. Anne Lytle	1. MaryAnn Beregi; 2. Katie Richmond; 3. Ian Grey; 4. Estelle Blair; 5. Jillian Christie	1. Angus Hoy; 2. Christopher Eddleston; 3. Andrew Assaee; 4. Graham Healy; 5. Fuchsia Sims	1. Shannon Welch; 2. Travis Velingos; 3. Christopher Lake; 4. Merilyn Alt; 5. Mathew Campbell
CommUnity 1st (Group E)	Liberal (Group F)	Team Jilly (Group G)	
1. Peter Noble; 2. Ian Mutton; 3. Joan Street; 4. Julie Lee; 5. Conway Restom	1. Jessica Keen; 2. Efi Carr; 3. Bryson Constable; 4. Andrew Skinner; 5. Hunter Wardman	1. Pallavi Sinha; 2. Strephon Billinghurst; 3. Leonie Rothwell; 4. Craig Black; 5. Harshita Jyoti; 6. Rajeswari Swaminathan	

=== St Leonards ===
Real Independents (Group A)	Independent (Group B)	Sustainable Australia (Group C)	Labor (Group D)
1. Zoë Baker; 2. Christopher Holding; 3. Nicole Antonini; 4. Diana Davidson; 5. Rebecca McDonald	1. James Spenceley; 2. Daniel Whitford; 3. Felicity Gardner; 4. Deon Ludick; 5. Christopher Neville	1. Michael Want; 2. William Bourke; 3. Susan Kitchener; 4. John Heathers; 5. Enzo Smith	1. Godfrey Santer; 2. Jade Tyrrell; 3. Rayna Brown; 4. Julie Anne Newton; 5. Olivia Lee

=== Withdrawn candidates ===
Party	Candidate	Ward	Details
Liberal	Sophie Lambert	St Leonards	Candidate unable to contest because of missed candidacy deadline.
Team Jilly	Jilly Gibson	Cammeraygal	Initially announced plan to recontest but withdrew citing move to Mosman.

== Results ==
=== Ward results ===
2024 North Sydney Council election: Ward results
Party	Votes	%	Swing	Seats	Change
The Real Independents	11,825	32.2		4	▲2
Liberal	6,084	16.5		2	▲2
Labor	5,981	16.3		2	Steady
Independents	4,708	12.8		1	Steady
Sustainable Australia	3,308	9.0		0	▼2
Greens	2,304	6.3		1	▲1
CommUnity 1st	1,670	4.5		0	▼1
Team Jilly	1,355	3.7		0	▼2
Formal votes	36,762	93.7			
Informal votes	1,731	6.3			
Total	39,246	100.0		10	
Registered voters / turnout	49,176	79.8			

=== Cammeraygal ===
2024 North Sydney Council election: Cammeraygal Ward
Party	Candidate	Votes	%	±%
Liberal	1. Jessica Keen (elected 1); 2. Efi Carr (elected 4); 3. Bryson Constable; 4. Andrew Skinner; 5. Hunter Wardman	6,084	31.8	+31.8
The Real Independents	1. MaryAnn Beregi (elected 2); 2. Katie Richmond; 3. Ian Grey; 4. Estelle Blair; 5. Jillian Christie	3,361	17.6	+2.2
Labor	1. Shannon Welch (elected 3); 2. Travis Velingos; 3. Christopher Lake; 4. Merilyn Alt; 5. Mathew Campbell	2,961	15.5	+0.0
Greens	1. Angus Hoy (elected 5); 2. Christopher Eddleston; 3. Andrew Assaee; 4. Graham Healy; 5. Fuchsia Sims	2,304	12.0	+12.0
CommUnity 1st	1. Peter Noble; 2. Ian Mutton; 3. Joan Street; 4. Julie Lee; 5. Conway Restom	1,670	8.7	+8.7
Sustainable Australia	1. Sarah Kok; 2. Bob Eggleton; 3. Peter Moor; 4. Mark Marsi; 5. Anne Lytle	1,399	7.3	−3.4
Team Jilly	1. Pallavi Sinha; 2. Strephon Billinghurst; 3. Leonie Rothwell; 4. Craig Black; 5. Harshita Jyoti; 6. Rajeswari Swaminathan	1,355	7.1	−18.2
Total formal votes		18,381	96.6	
Informal votes		677	3.4	
Turnout		19,811	78.3	

=== St Leonards ===
2024 North Sydney Council election: St Leonards Ward
Party	Candidate	Votes	%	±%
The Real Independents	1. Zoë Baker (elected 1); 2. Christopher Holding (elected 4); 3. Nicole Antonini (elected 5); 4. Diana Davidson; 5. Rebecca McDonald	8,464	46.1	+20.4
Independent	1. James Spenceley (elected 2); 2. Daniel Whitford; 3. Felicity Gardner; 4. Deon Ludick; 5. Christopher Neville	4,708	25.6	+6.9
Labor	1. Godfrey Santer (elected 3); 2. Jade Tyrrell; 3. Rayna Brown; 4. Julie Anne Newton; 5. Olivia Lee	3,290	17.9	+0.0
Sustainable Australia	1. Michael Want; 2. William Bourke; 3. Susan Kitchener; 4. John Heathers; 5. Enzo Smith	1,919	10.4	−2.7
Total formal votes		18,381	94.6	
Informal votes		1,054	5.4	
Turnout		19,435	81.4	
