= Amnet =

Amnet may refer to:

- A subsidiary of Amcom Telecommunications based and operating in Perth, Western Australia
- A subsidiary of Millicom, a telecommunications company based in Luxembourg and operating internationally
