= Tarella (Cammeray) =

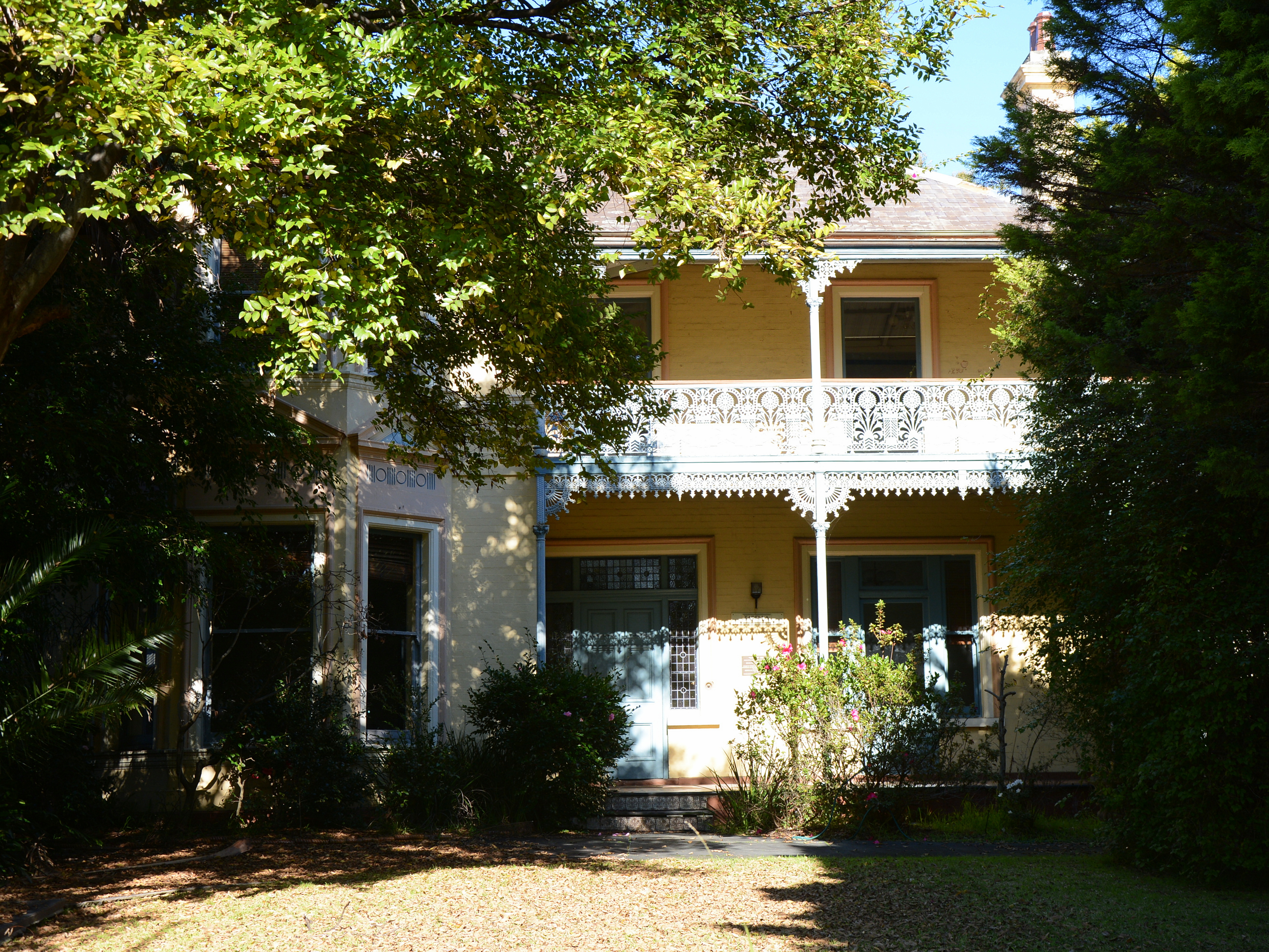
- Tarella, pictured in 2015.

- Location within Sydney Location within Australia
- 33°49′24″S 151°12′32″E
- Location: 3 Amherst Street, Cammeray, North Sydney Council, New South Wales, Australia

History
- Built: 1874–1886
- Built for: Sir Joseph Palmer Abbott KCMG

Site notes
- Architectural style: Victorian Italianate

New South Wales Heritage Register
- Official name: Tarella
- Type: State heritage (built)
- Designated: 2 April 1999
- Reference no.: 270
- Type: House
- Category: Residential buildings (private)

Tarella is a heritage-listed former residence and now business premises located at 3 Amherst Street, Cammeray, North Sydney Council, New South Wales, Australia. It was built from 1874 to 1886. The property is privately owned. It was added to the New South Wales State Heritage Register on 2 April 1999.

== History ==
Amherst Street is named after Lord William Pitt Amherst who was Governor General of India 1823-1828. Some old directories and plans misspell this street as AMHURST.

Tarella was originally the house of Sir Joseph Palmer Abbott KCMG, a former speaker of the New South Wales Legislative Assembly from 1880-1900. Abbott built Tarella c. 1886, on land he had acquired in 1881. Abbott was a member of the Conventions formed to frame a Constitution for the Commonwealth of Australia that were held in 1891, 1897-98. From 1891-1900 he was Chairman of the Board of Directors of the AMP Society. He died in 1901. Nearby Palmer Street in Cammeray is named after Sir Joseph Palmer Abbott.

A file on Tarella held in the North Sydney Stanton Library Local History Unit has a photograph taken in 1899 that does not show the two Canary Island date palms. These appear to have been planted in the early 20th century, a species that was popularised by Joseph Maiden, after he planted a triple avenue of these palms along Macquarie Street in the 1910s.

Tarella was fully restored by the early 1970s. It was furnished appropriately. It has two plaques, donated by the owner and AMP Society. The house has good coloured glass and beautiful iron lace. Front lawns and garden, with fountain and iron gates (relocated) from the historic St John's Anglican Church, Parramatta.

In 1982 the then owner John Hawkins sought North Sydney Council approval of a rezoning proposal to allow the house to be used as professional offices by architects Edwards, Madigan, Torzillo and Briggs. Hawkins who had restored the property was keen that it be retained, and if this use was the key was supportive. North Sydney Council opposed any rezoning, citing concerns at gradual loss of its residential areas particularly sites such as this. Hawkins threatened to lodge a development application to demolish the house if rezoning were not approved.

The Heritage Council considered the rezoning proposal and the request for an order under the Heritage Act. It decided that while it was aware of North Sydney Council's policy aimed at preventing further alienation of residential land in the municipality, it considered that the building is of such heritage significance that it would support proposals to rezone the site for uses compatible with the heritage significance of the building and which would ensure its retention and maintenance. Further it advised that in the event that it was advised of proposed demolition of the building, the Heritage Council would consider recommending its protection under the NSW Heritage Act.

The property, now empty, was bought in 2001 by Simply Technology and is leased to the childcare centre company, Brenham P/L. Brenham P/L in 2015 proposed a childcare centre for 80 children at Tarella, to operate five days a week. The company operates two childcare centres in Sydney. North Sydney City Council's Independent Planning Panel refused a development application for this use in April 2015 on several grounds. The Heritage Council also refused an integrated development application due to adverse impacts on heritage significance, fabric and setting. An appeal was lodged with the NSW Land and Environment Court. A childcare centre use was subsequently approved by NSW Land and Environment Court.

== Description ==
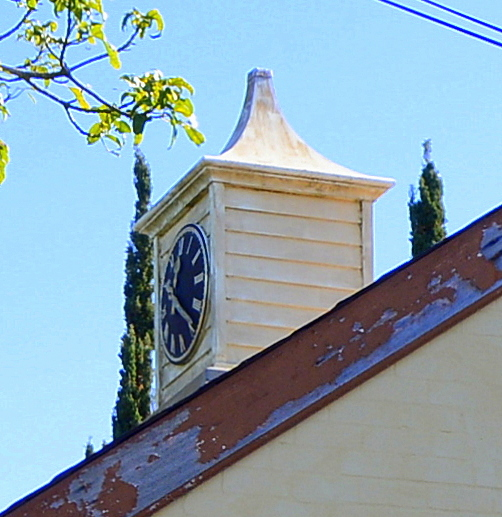
The clocktower on the coachhouse, pictured in 2015.

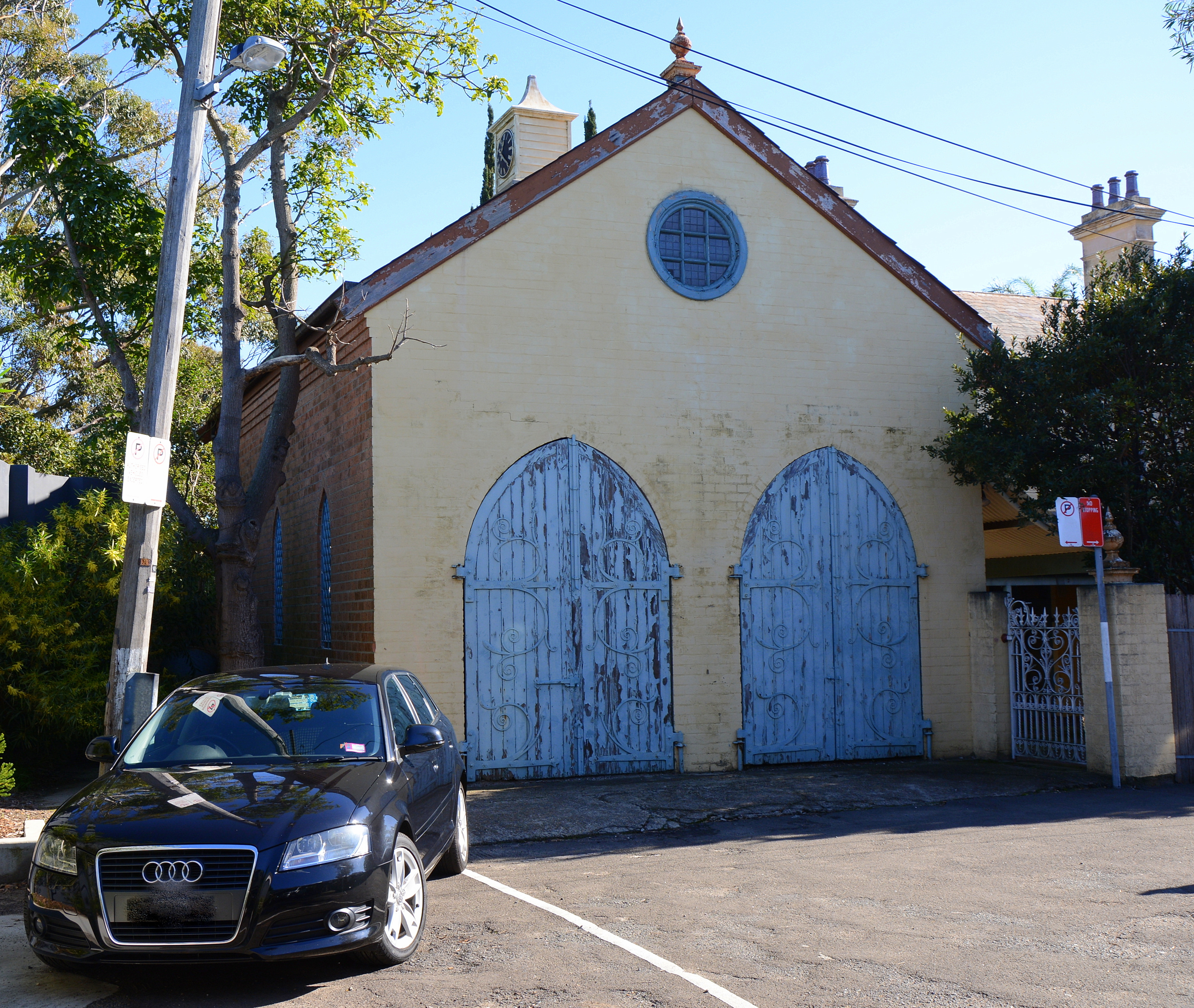
The coachhouse, pictured in 2015.

=== Grounds ===
The house is set well-back from the street frontage on a large site, with a serpentine drive through extensive lawn area, framed by trees and shrub plantings. There is a large semi-formal garden between the painted iron palisade fence on the Amherst Street boundary and the house. The garden features two mature Canary Island date (Phoenix canariensis) and Alexandra (Archontophoenix alexandrae) palms, Himalayan cedar (Cedrus deodara), lavender hedges, roses, pomegranate (Punica granatum) and frangipani (Plumeria rubra cv.) trees with a fountain and pond in the lawn. An ornamental cast-iron fence marks the street front.

The date of much of the garden fabric may be early 20th century. An 1899 photograph held in the North Sydney Stanton Library shows no Canary Island date palms, suggesting they date to the early 20th century (NB: this species was popularised by Joseph Maiden after he planted a triple avenue of it along Macquarie Street. The garden contains species not authentic to the Victorian era. The concrete path is not part of the original landscape. The pond, fountain and relocated iron gates appear to date from later in the twentieth century, possibly during the Hawkins ownership era. Fine garden and entry to house.

=== House ===
Residence of an important public figure of the nineteenth century. One of the earliest buildings established in the vicinity and one of the earliest still in existence. A two-storey Victorian Italianate style residence of brick construction (tuck-pointed, now painted) with corbelled brick eaves and hipped slate roof. The house has a two-storey verandah on the main (north) elevation; the lower level verandah is paved with tesselated tiles in a mosaic pattern with a slate border; slender cast-iron columns support the timber structures of the upper level. Panelled front door has sidelights, a leadlight panel over and brass door knob, knocker and bell pull.

Remarkably fine imposing Victorian mansion on southern side of Amherst Street, backing on to the Warringah, located roughly halfway between Miller and West Streets. Fine iron work to two storey returned verandah. AHC RNI entry said built between 1872-1893 (c. 1874), in contrast to NSHR date of 1886. Interior features are substantially intact, including a grand timber staircase and main entry lobby with a large stained glass window about the stair landing, 13 marble fireplaces and fine door/window joinery. Plaster ceilings are generally intact.

=== Outbuildings ===
A two-storey stable building, modern-built during the Hawkins ownership in sympathetic quasi-Gothic style is behind the house, facing a laneway. This has double pointed arch doorways.

=== Condition ===
As at 24 February 2016, beautifully restored. Both exterior and interior are in good condition and maintained in period style.

=== Modifications and dates ===
A sympathetic coachhouse was constructed recently by Mr. J. Hawkins at the rear of the site. Some modifications have been made to minor rooms at the rear and an unsympathetic small stables building has been added at the southwestern side but could be dismantled with only minor effect on the residence.

=== Further information ===
Condition ranked as excellent in 1981 North Sydney Heritage Study. Integrity then ranked as "intact". In exceptionally sound condition, well maintained and its interior features are substantially intact.

== Heritage listing ==
Tarella was listed on the New South Wales State Heritage Register on 2 April 1999.

== See also ==
- Australian residential architectural styles
