= Amcom =

Amcom may refer to:

- United States Army Aviation and Missile Command (AMCOM)
- Amcom Telecommunications, an Australian company
