= North Sydney Council =

- Local government area
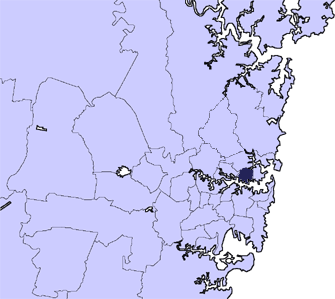
- Location in Metropolitan Sydney

- Interactive map of North Sydney Council
- Coordinates: 33°50′S 151°12′E
- Country: Australia
- State: New South Wales
- Established: 29 July 1890
- Council seat: Council Chambers

Government
  - Mayor: Zoë Baker
  - State electorates: North Shore; Willoughby
  - Federal divisions: Warringah; Bradfield

Area
  - Total: 10.9 km^{2} (4.2 sq mi)

Population
  - Total: 68,950 (2021 census)
  - Density: 6,326/km^{2} (16,380/sq mi)
- Parish: Willoughby
- Website: North Sydney Council
LGAs around North Sydney Council
Willoughby	Willoughby	Northern Beaches
Lane Cove	North Sydney Council	Mosman
Inner West	Sydney	Woollahra

North Sydney Council is a local government area on the Lower North Shore of Sydney, New South Wales, Australia, established on 29 July 1890 through the amalgamation of three boroughs.

The area is bounded by Willoughby to the north and north-west, Northern Beaches to the north-east, Mosman to the east, Lane Cove to the west and Sydney Harbour to the south. It covers an area of approximately 10.9 square kilometres (4.2 sq mi) and as at the 2016 census had an estimated population of 67,658. The administrative seat of North Sydney Council is located in the suburb of North Sydney, approximately 3 kilometres (1.9 mi) north of the Sydney central business district.

The mayor of North Sydney Council is Zoë Baker, an independent politician, first elected on 10 January 2022.

== Suburbs and localities in the local government area ==
Suburbs serviced by North Sydney Council are:

- Cammeray
- Cremorne
- Cremorne Point
- Crows Nest
- Kirribilli
- Kurraba Point
- Lavender Bay
- McMahons Point
- Milsons Point
- Neutral Bay
- North Sydney
- St Leonards
- Waverton
- Wollstonecraft

== History ==
The 1925 extension of the Council Chambers, c. 1930.

The area now covered by North Sydney Council originally comprised three municipalities: the Borough of East St Leonards from 1860 (Kirribilli, Cremorne Point, Milsons Point), the Borough of St Leonards from 1867 (Cammeray, Mosman, Waverton, Wollstonecraft) and the very small Borough of Victoria from 1871 (McMahons Point and parts of North Sydney and Lavender Bay). These boroughs lasted until 29 July 1890 when they merged to form the "Borough of North Sydney".

Following a petition submitted by residents in 1892, on 11 April 1893 the Mossman Ward of North Sydney confirmed its separation as the Borough of Mosman, being proclaimed by Lieutenant-Governor Sir Frederick Darley. From 28 December 1906, following the passing of the Local Government Act, 1906, the council was renamed as the "Municipality of North Sydney".

North Sydney Municipal Council first met in the 1885 East St Leonards Town Hall on Alfred Street, Milsons Point, that had been built for the Borough of East St Leonards, and took up residence in the North Sydney Council Chambers on Miller Street, North Sydney, from 12 July 1926.

=== Post-war council history and Mack era ===
With the completion of the Warringah Expressway in 1968, a construction that involved the wide-scale demolition of areas in the centre of the municipality, North Sydney was split in two and development in the North Sydney central business district took off. With this development resulting in the destruction of the heritage streetscape of the North Sydney CBD, threatening the character of surrounding areas, several movements of North Sydney residents formed to oppose and manage the pace and extent of development. One prominent group was the North Sydney Civic Group, which came to prominence in the late-1970s amid dissatisfaction with the North Sydney Council. The Council's plans for the demolition of the historic Council Chambers following a fire in 1976, led to further tensions and resulted in the council being turned out at the 1980 elections, replaced by a North Sydney Civic Group-aligned council and Ted Mack elected mayor.

Mack's term as mayor, was marked by a single-minded and innovative approach to the local governance issues facing North Sydney at the time. Mack began his term as mayor by selling the mayoral car to help buy community buses. During his term as mayor, North Sydney Council introduced the "open government policy" which honoured a promise of openness and transparency of council decisions, and established a precinct committee system, which allowed for greater citizen input in council issues. The pioneering North Sydney Heritage Study was released in 1982 and in 1989 the new Local Environmental Plan was gazetted.

With an increase in council revenues, Mack reinvested the funds in a public works program into several new and renovated parks, car parks, childcare facilities, community and sports centres, and major extensions and renovations to the Stanton Library and North Sydney Oval. Infrastructure also took on a distinct local identity, with Council investment on new street signs, bus shelters, colour schemes of public buildings, paving and street furniture. In 1982, council voted to popularly elect the mayor, with Mack being directly elected twice to the position in 1983 and 1987 before retiring in 1988.

With the passing of the Local Government Act, 1993, the Municipality of North Sydney was legally renamed as North Sydney Council and aldermen were renamed councillors.

=== 2016–17 amalgamation proposals ===
A 2015 review of local government boundaries by the NSW Government Independent Pricing and Regulatory Tribunal recommended that the North Sydney Council merge with adjoining councils.

The government considered two proposals. The first proposed a merger of the North Sydney and Willoughby Councils to form a new council with an area of 33 square kilometres (13 sq mi) and support a population of approximately 145,000. The alternative, proposed by Warringah Council on 23 February 2016, was for an amalgamation of the Pittwater, Manly and Warringah councils. As a consequence of Warringah's proposal, the New South Wales Minister for Local Government Paul Toole proposed that the North Sydney, Willoughby and Mosman Councils merge.

In July 2017, the Berejiklian government decided to abandon the forced merger of the North Sydney, Willoughby and Mosman local government areas, along with several other proposed forced mergers.

=== Town Clerks and General Managers ===
Name	Term	Notes
William Barnett Smith	16 August 1890 – 1 September 1921	
Percy Augustus Temple	September 1921 – February 1923	
Hubert Perry	February 1923 – 10 July 1938	
Leslie Fitzpatrick	11 July 1938 – 1966	
Don W. Geddes	1966 – October 1978	
Stuart S. Fyfe	October 1978 – 1981	
Ross Kempshall	1981 – 14 May 2001	
Penny Holloway	14 May 2001 – 6 December 2013	
Warwick Winn	6 December 2013 – April 2016	
Ken Gouldthorp	11 December 2016 – 1 July 2022	
Robert Emerson (acting)	1 July 2022 – 21 November 2022	
Therese Cole	21 November 2022 – date	

== Demographics ==
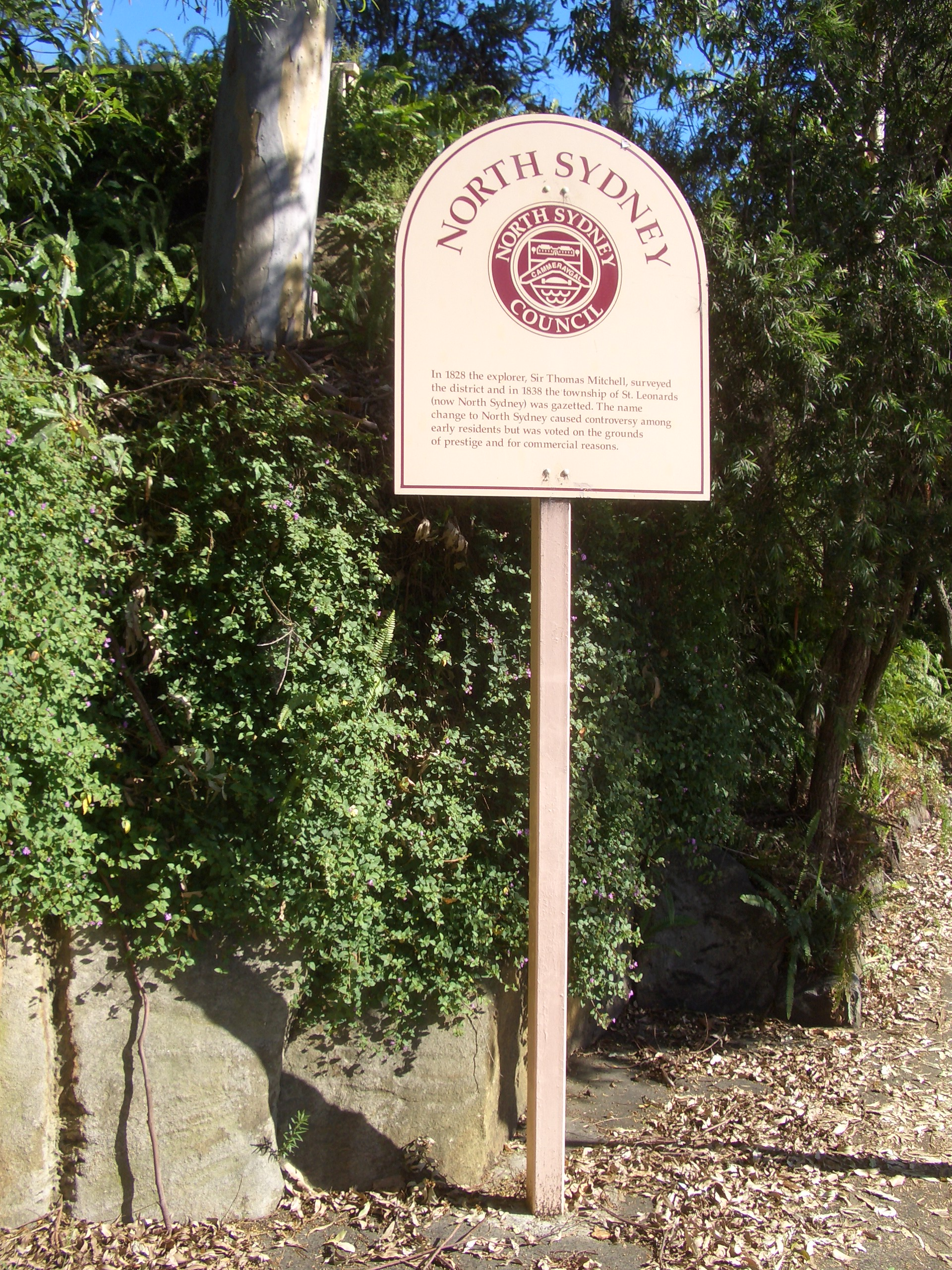
North Sydney Council signpost at Cammeray

At the 2016 census, there were 67,658 people in the North Sydney local government area, of these 47.2 per cent were male and 52.8 per cent were female. Aboriginal and Torres Strait Islander people made up 0.3 per cent of the population; significantly below the NSW and Australian averages of 2.9 and 2.8 per cent respectively. The median age of people in the North Sydney Council area was 37 years; slightly below the national average of 38 years. Children aged 0–14 years made up 12.6 per cent of the population and people aged 65 years and over made up 14.4 per cent of the population. Of people in the area aged 15 years and over, 41.9 per cent were married and 16.6 per cent were either divorced or separated.

Population growth in the North Sydney Council area between the 2001 census and the 2006 census was 5.98%; and in the subsequent five years to the 2011 census, population growth was 6.92%. At the 2016 census, the population in the North Sydney Council area increased by 8.62 per cent. When compared with total population growth of Australia for the same period, being 8.8 per cent, population growth in the North Sydney local government area was marginally lower than the national average. The median weekly income for residents within the North Sydney Council area was significantly higher and nearly double the national average.

Selected historical census data for North Sydney local government area
Census year		2001	2006	2011	2016	2021
Population	Estimated residents on census night	54,970	58,257	62,289	67,658	68,950
Population	LGA rank in terms of size within New South Wales		39th	▲37th	▲36th	36th
Population	% of New South Wales population		0.90%	0.90%	0.90%	▼0.85%
Population	% of Australian population	0.29%	▼0.26%	▲0.29%	0.29%	▼0.27%
Population	Estimated ATSI population on census night	97	110	134	199	278
Population	% of ATSI population to residents	0.2%	0.2%	0.2%	▲0.3%	▲0.4%
Median weekly incomes						
Personal income	Median weekly personal income		A$1,010	A$1,216	A$1,386	A$1,593
Personal income	% of Australian median income		207.8%	▲210.7%	▼209.4%	▼197.9%
Family income	Median weekly family income		A$1,772	A$2,768	A$3,210	A$3,743
Family income	% of Australian median income		172.5%	▲186.9%	▼185.1%	▼176.6%
Household income	Median weekly household income		A$2,510	A$2,205	A$2,360	A$2,524
Household income	% of Australian median income		214.3%	▼178.7%	▼164.1%	▼144.6%
Dwelling structure						
Dwelling type	Flat or apartment	70.9%	▼70.3%	▲71.0%	▲74.4%	▲75.7%
Dwelling type	Semi-detached, terrace or townhouse	15.0%	15.0%	▼14.7%	▼14.0%	▼12.7%
Dwelling type	Separate house	12.3%	▲13.9%	▼13.8%	▼11.0%	▲11.1%

Selected historical census data for North Sydney local government area
Ancestry, top responses
2001		2006		2011		2016		2021	
No Data		No Data		English	25.4%	English	▼24.6%	English	▲33.6%
No Data		No Data		Australian	17.9%	Australian	▼16.2%	Australian	▲22.9%
No Data		No Data		Irish	9.4%	Irish	▲10.0%	Irish	▲12.9%
No Data		No Data		Scottish	7.5%	Scottish	▲7.6%	Chinese	▲10.8%
No Data		No Data		Chinese	5.7%	Chinese	▲6.3%	Scottish	▲10.3%
Country of birth, top responses
2001		2006		2011		2016		2021	
Australia	58.2%	Australia	▼55.4%	Australia	▼54.7%	Australia	▼54.2%	Australia	▲56.0%
England	7.4%	England	▼6.8%	England	▲7.0%	England	▼6.6%	England	▼6.3%
New Zealand	4.1%	New Zealand	▼3.6%	New Zealand	▼3.3%	New Zealand	▼3.0%	China	▲3.7%
Japan	2.1%	Japan	▼1.9%	China	▲2.2%	China	▲2.9%	New Zealand	▼2.6%
Hong Kong	1.6%	China	▲1.7%	Japan	▼1.7%	India	▲2.0%	India	▲2.3%
United States of America	1.4%	Hong Kong	▼1.5%	South Africa	▲1.5%	South Africa	▲1.6%	South Africa	▲1.8%
Language, top responses (other than English)
2001		2006		2011		2016		2021	
Cantonese	2.6%	Cantonese	▲2.7%	Cantonese	2.7%	Mandarin	▲3.4%	Mandarin	▲4.3%
Japanese	2.2%	Japanese	▼2.1%	Mandarin	▲2.4%	Cantonese	▼2.5%	Cantonese	▲2.7%
Mandarin	1.2%	Mandarin	▲1.7%	Japanese	▼1.9%	Japanese	▼1.8%	Spanish	▲1.6%
French	0.7%	Spanish	▲0.7%	Spanish	▲1.1%	Spanish	▲1.4%	Japanese	▼1.5%
Italian	0.6%	French	0.7%	French	▲0.9%	French	▲1.1%	Portuguese	▲0.9%
Religious affiliation, top responses
2001		2006		2011		2016		2021	
Catholic	23.9%	Catholic	▼23.3%	No Religion	▲28.9%	No Religion	▲37.3%	No Religion	▲45.6%
Anglican	22.6%	No Religion	▲23.0%	Catholic	▼23.0%	Catholic	▼21.4%	Catholic	▼20.4%
No Religion	20.5%	Anglican	▼19.9%	Anglican	▼17.4%	Anglican	▼13.0%	Anglican	▼10.9%
Uniting Church	3.7%	Uniting Church	▼3.2%	Buddhism	▲3.1%	Not Stated	▲11.8%	Not Stated	▼5.9%
Presbyterian and Reformed	3.6%	Buddhism	▲2.9%	Uniting Church	▼2.5%	Buddhism	▼2.7%	Buddhism	▼2.6%

== Council ==
=== Composition and election methods ===
Term	Aldermen/Councillors	Wards	Mayor
1890–1891	33	No wards	Annual election by Aldermen
1892–1893	18 (3 per ward)	Victoria Ward; Belmore Ward; Kirribilli Ward; Tunks Ward; Warringa Ward; Mossman's Ward	Annual election by Aldermen
1893–1956	15 (3 per ward)	Victoria Ward; Belmore Ward; Kirribilli Ward; Tunks Ward; Warringa Ward	Annual election by Aldermen
1956–1983	15 (3 per ward)	Victoria Ward; Belmore Ward; Kirribilli Ward; Tunks Ward; East Ward	Annual election by Aldermen
1983–1995	15/16 (3 per ward, 1 Mayor)	Victoria Ward; Belmore Ward; Kirribilli Ward; Tunks Ward; East Ward	Direct quadrennial election
1995–2017	13 (3 per ward, 1 Mayor)	Cremorne Ward; Tunks Ward; Victoria Ward; Wollstonecraft Ward	Direct quadrennial election
2017–2021	10 (3 per ward, 1 Mayor)	Tunks Ward; Victoria Ward; Wollstonecraft Ward	Direct quadrennial election
2021–present	10 (5 per ward)	St Leonards Ward; Cammeraygal Ward	Biennial election by Councillors

=== Current wards and election method ===
North Sydney Council is composed of ten councillors operating on a Council–manager system of operation, elected proportionally from two wards, each electing five Councillors. The mayor is elected by the Councillors for a two-year term and the deputy mayor for a one-year term.

A referendum passed at the same time at the 2012 council elections reduced the number of wards from four to three (Cremorne ward was abolished) and the number of councillors from 13 to 10, inclusive of the directly elected mayor, which took effect from the 2017 election. A referendum passed at the 2017 election also altered the system of electing the mayor. Starting in 2021, the mayor was elected by the councillors from among their members for a two-year term. As the wording of this referendum did not specify a reduction in the number of elected positions in the Council (such as from 10 councillors to 9), the Office of Local Government required council to specify a ward structure of equal numbers to each ward: two wards of five councillors or five wards of two councillors. At its extraordinary meeting held on 20 January 2020, the council voted to adopt a two-ward model on a north/south boundary with the northern ward named "St Leonards Ward" and the southern ward named "Cammeraygal Ward" from the 2021 election.

=== Current council ===
The most recent election was held on 14 September 2024.

Party	Councillors
Independents	5
Labor	2
Liberal	2
Greens	1
Total	10

Councillors were elected in the following order. (See next section for more details and references)

Ward	Councillor	Party	Notes
Cammeraygal Ward	Jessica Keen	Liberal	Second term (non consecutive)
Cammeraygal Ward	Maryann Beregi	The Real Independents	Fourth term
Cammeraygal Ward	Shannon Welch	Labor	Second term
Cammeraygal Ward	Efi Carr	Liberal	
Cammeraygal Ward	Angus Hoy	Greens	
St Leonards Ward	Zoë Baker	The Real Independents	Mayor. Fifth term
St Leonards Ward	James Spenceley	Independent	Second Term
St Leonards Ward	Godfrey Santer	Labor	Deputy Mayor. Second term
St Leonards Ward	Christopher Holding	The Real Independents	
St Leonards Ward	Nicole Antonini	The Real Independents	

== Election results ==
=== 2024 ===
2024 North Sydney Council election: Ward results
Party	Votes	%	Swing	Seats	Change
The Real Independents	11,825	32.2		4	▲2
Liberal	6,084	16.5		2	▲2
Labor	5,981	16.3		2	Steady
Independents	4,708	12.8		1	Steady
Sustainable Australia	3,308	9.0		0	▼2
Greens	2,304	6.3		1	▲1
CommUnity 1st	1,670	4.5		0	▼1
Team Jilly	1,355	3.7		0	▼2
Formal votes	36,762	93.7			
Informal votes	1,731	6.3			
Total	39,246	100.0		10	
Registered voters / turnout	49,176	79.8			

== Heritage listings ==
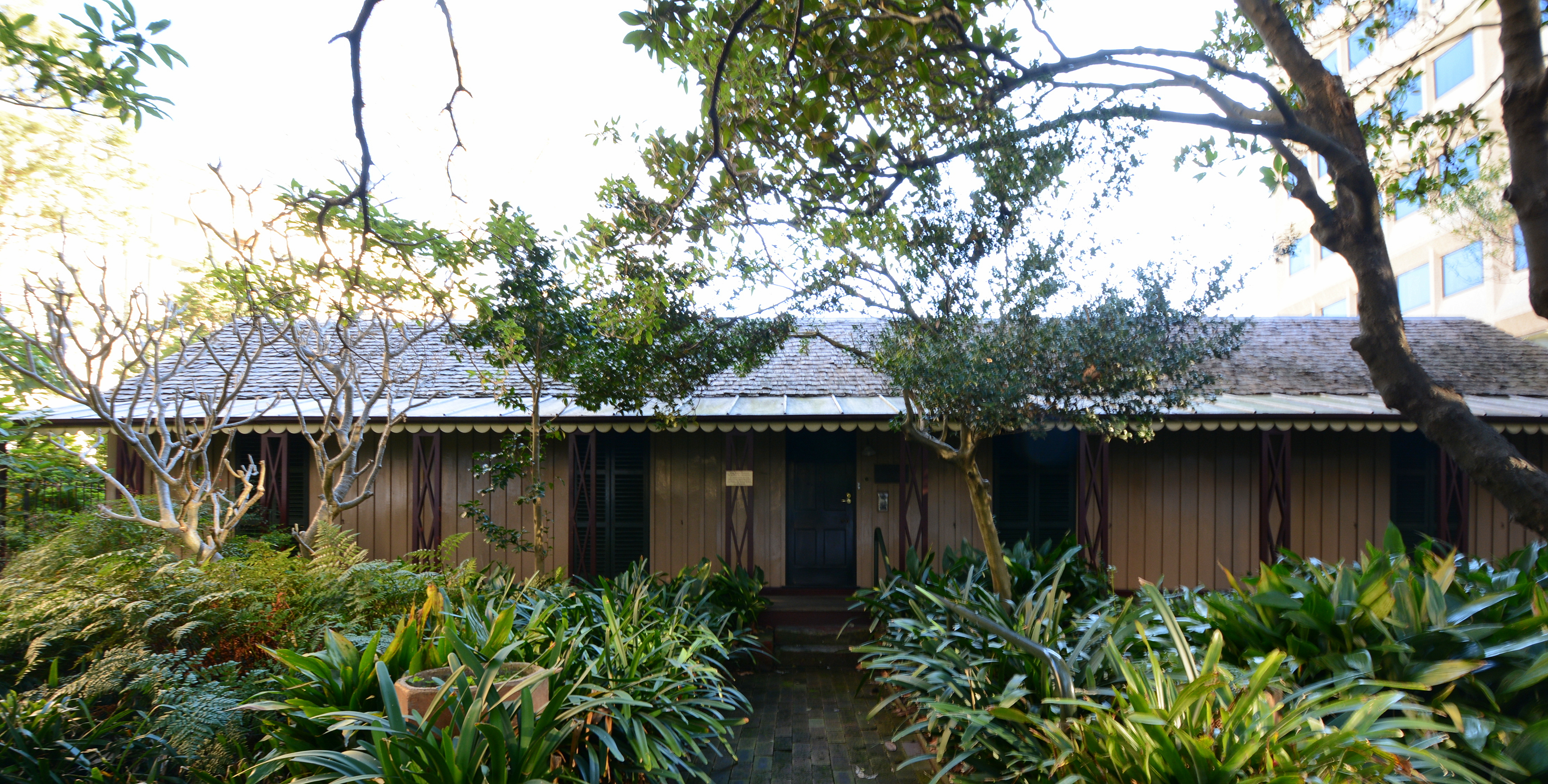
The heritage-listed Don Bank Museum is the oldest-surviving wooden house in North Sydney and is owned by North Sydney Council.

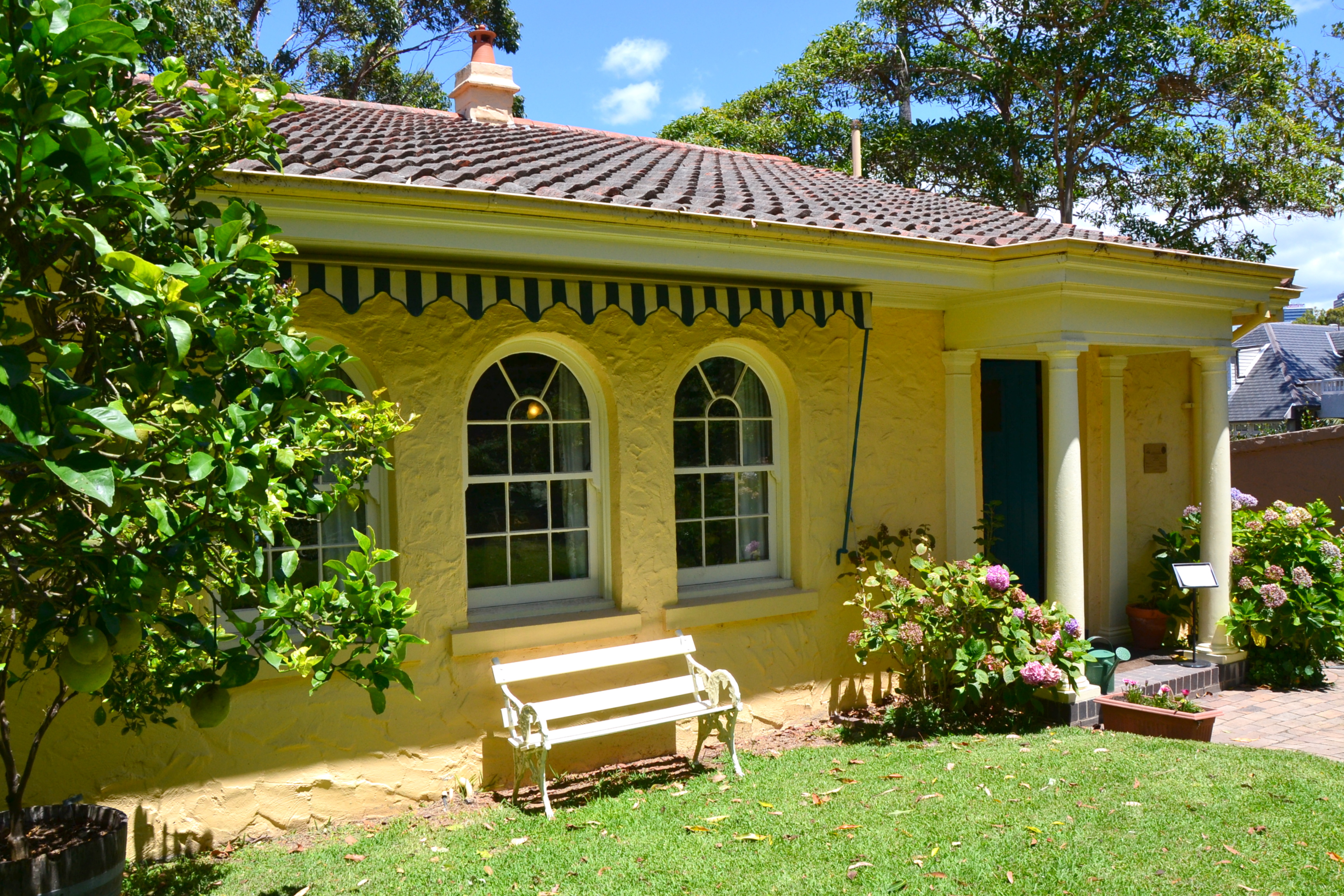
The home of May Gibbs, Nutcote (1925) in Kurraba Point, was designed by B. J. Waterhouse and is owned by North Sydney Council under the management of a trust.

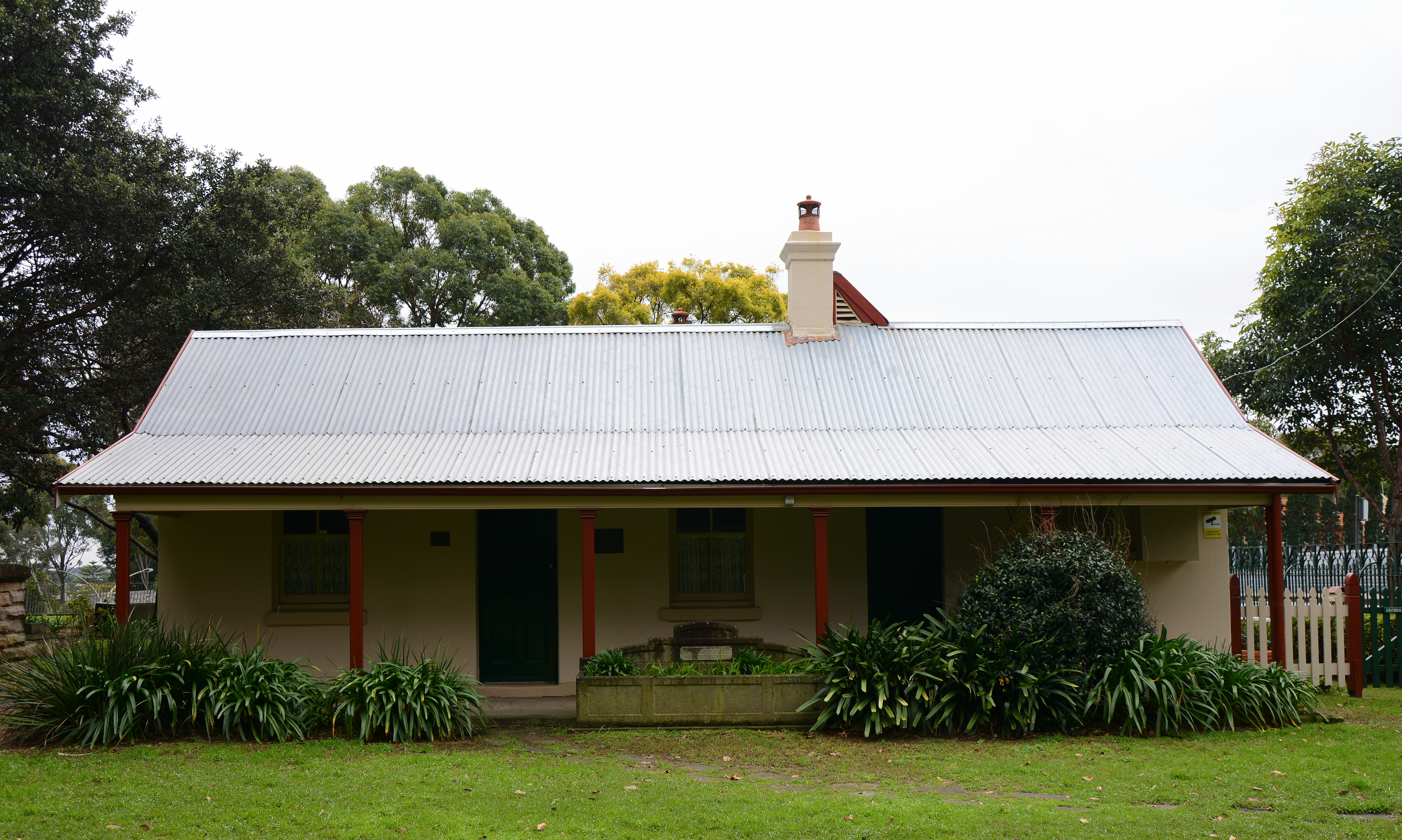
The "Sexton's Cottage" (c. 1850) in the Council-owned St Thomas Rest Park is now a museum of the former cemetery.

North Sydney has a diverse range of heritage listings and conservation areas, including those listed on the New South Wales State Heritage Register (SHR), Section 170 Registers (s.170), the Commonwealth Heritage List (CHL), and the North Sydney Local Environmental Plan 2013 (LEP), including:

- Cammeray, 3 Amherst Street: Tarella (SHR & LEP)
- Cammeray, 143 Bellevue Street: Cammeray Substation (SHR & LEP)
- Cremorne, 8 Bannerman Street: Dalkeith (SHR & LEP)
- Cremorne, 380 Military Road: Hayden Orpheum Picture Palace (LEP)
- Cremorne, 53–57 Murdoch Street: Cremorne Girls High School (Former) (LEP)
- Cremorne, 274 Military Road: SCEGGS Redlands (LEP)
- Cremorne, 7 Cranbrook Avenue: Belvedere (SHR & LEP)
- Cremorne, 11 Cranbrook Avenue: Egglemont (SHR & LEP)
- Crows Next, 23 Albany Street: Electricity Power House (SHR, s.170 & LEP)
- Crows Nest, 250 West Street: St Thomas Rest Park (LEP)
- Kirribilli, 109 Kirribilli Avenue: Admiralty House, Lodge, Garden and Fortifications (CHL & LEP)
- Kirribilli, 111 Kirribilli Avenue: Kirribilli House, Garden and Grounds (CHL & LEP)
- Lavender Bay, 11 Bay View Street: Ildemere (SHR & LEP)
- Milsons Point, North Shore railway: Milsons Point railway station (SHR, s.170 & LEP)
- Milsons Point, 1 Olympic Drive: Luna Park Precinct (SHR & LEP)
- Neutral Bay, 2 Hayes Street: Hastings
- Neutral Bay, 146 Kurraba Road: Hollowforth (SHR & LEP)
- Neutral Bay, 5 Wallaringa Avenue: Nutcote
- Neutral Bay, Yeo Street: St John's Uniting Church and Pipe Organ
- Neutral Bay, Kurraba Road: Anderson Park
- Neutral Bay, Kurraba Road: Former Neutral Bay tram depot and water tower
- North Sydney, 36 Blue Street: Former North Sydney Technical High School (now Greenwood Hotel)
- North Sydney, 20 Edward Street: Graythwaite
- North Sydney, Falcon Street: North Sydney Sewer Vent
- North Sydney, 283a Miller Street: St Leonards Park
- North Sydney, 6 Napier Street: Don Bank
- North Sydney, 92–94 Pacific Highway: North Sydney Post Office (CHL, SHR & LEP)
- North Sydney, 44 Union Street: Kailoa
- North Sydney, 105-153 Miller Street: MLC Building (LEP)
- North Sydney, 128 Miller Street: Monte Sant Angelo Group (LEP)
- North Sydney, 127 Falcon Street: North Sydney Boys High School (LEP)
- North Sydney, 200 Miller Street: North Sydney Council Chambers and Wyllie Wing (LEP)
- North Sydney, Miller Street: North Sydney Oval (LEP)
- North Sydney, William Street: Sydney Church of England Grammar School (LEP)
- North Sydney, 34 McLaren Street: St Thomas' Church, Rectory, Kindergarten Hall and Memorial Hall (LEP)
- Waverton, North Shore railway: Waverton railway station (SHR & s.170)

== Council facilities ==
- Kirribilli Neighbourhood Centre
- North Sydney Olympic Pool
- North Sydney Oval
- Stanton Library
- Don Bank Museum
- Clark Park
