= North Sydney Council Chambers =

Civic building in North Sydney, New South Wales, Australia

- Former names: Kelrose, Dr. Capper's House

General information
- Type: Municipal offices and chamber
- Architectural style: Federation Arts and Crafts
- Location: 200 Miller Street, North Sydney, New South Wales, Australia
- Coordinates: 33.8344°S 151.2072°E
- Completed: 1903
- Renovated: 1925–1926; 1935–1938; 1961–1968; 1975–1978; 1997–2000
- Owner: North Sydney Council

Design and construction
- Architect: Edward Jeaffreson Jackson
- Main contractor: R. G. Ochs

Renovating team
- Architects: Albert Edmund Bates (1925–26); Rupert Minnett (1935–38); John L. Browne (1961–68); Harry Seidler and Associates (1975–78); Feiko Bouman (1997–2000)
- Main contractor: Frank Cogan (1925–26); Girvan Bros. (1935–38); R. J. Bennell Pty Ltd (1966); M. Beribank (1968); Gledhill’s Pty Ltd (1997–2000)

Website
- www.northsydney.nsw.gov.au

The North Sydney Council Chambers is a landmark civic complex on a block bounded by Miller and McLaren streets in North Sydney, New South Wales, Australia. Originally conceived as a Federation Arts and Crafts residence by Edward Jeaffreson Jackson in 1903, the main building served as a private hospital before being purchased by the Municipality of North Sydney for its new chambers in 1925, with sympathetic extensions being completed in 1926, 1938 and 1968 to accommodate for this new usage. While it has remained the seat of North Sydney Council since 1926, the Council Chambers have been further extended with the completion of the modernist Wyllie Wing by Harry Seidler in 1977 and the Carole Baker Building in 2000 by Feiko Bouman.

== History ==
=== Kelrose, 1903–1925 ===
"Kelrose", sketch by B. J. Waterhouse c. 1908.

The original house on a block of land on the corner of Miller and McLaren streets, was purchased by Annie Capper in the 1880s from James Husband. This 1870 home of James Husband, was demolished in 1903 and a new house in the Arts and Crafts style known as “Kelrose”, was designed by Edward Jeaffreson Jackson who was commissioned by Capper to design a family house, which was completed in 1903 by R. G. Ochs. Jeaffreson Jackson, who is commemorated nearby with the Jeaffreson Jackson Reserve, was notable for being influential in developing the English Arts and Crafts style into an Australian architectural form known broadly as Federation style. As one of the first to introduce the bungalow to Sydney, it has been thought that he also introduced the terracotta Marseille-patterned tile to Australia. When Capper and her son, Dr. Capper, left the house a few years after its completion, it was used for a time as a private hospital.

By the 1920s, the Municipality of North Sydney, which had been formed by amalgamation in 1890, started looking for new council offices and identified Kelrose on its corner block as the most suitable, with a council resolution to resume the land passed in December 1923. The council appropriated A£12,000 for the purposes of resumption and alterations in July 1924.

=== Council Chambers, first iteration 1925–1935 ===
The 1925 extension of the Council Chambers, c. 1930.

In April 1925, Council commissioned Albert Edmund Bates to design sympathetic extensions to the existing building to an estimated cost of £6000. Work by contractor Frank Cogan commenced in December 1925 and was completed in July 1926 at a total cost of £15,000, including land acquisition and construction costs. The new chambers building was officially opened by former Prime Minister and Member for North Sydney, Billy Hughes, on 10 July 1926, who declared that "Nothing can be got without effort - Risks must be taken, and money must be borrowed in order that we can develop this great country of ours".

North Sydney Municipal Council vacated the 1885 East St Leonards Town Hall on Alfred Street, Milsons Point, that had originally been built for the former Borough of East St Leonards, and took up residence in the council chambers from 12 July 1926.

=== Council Chambers, extensions 1935–1968 ===
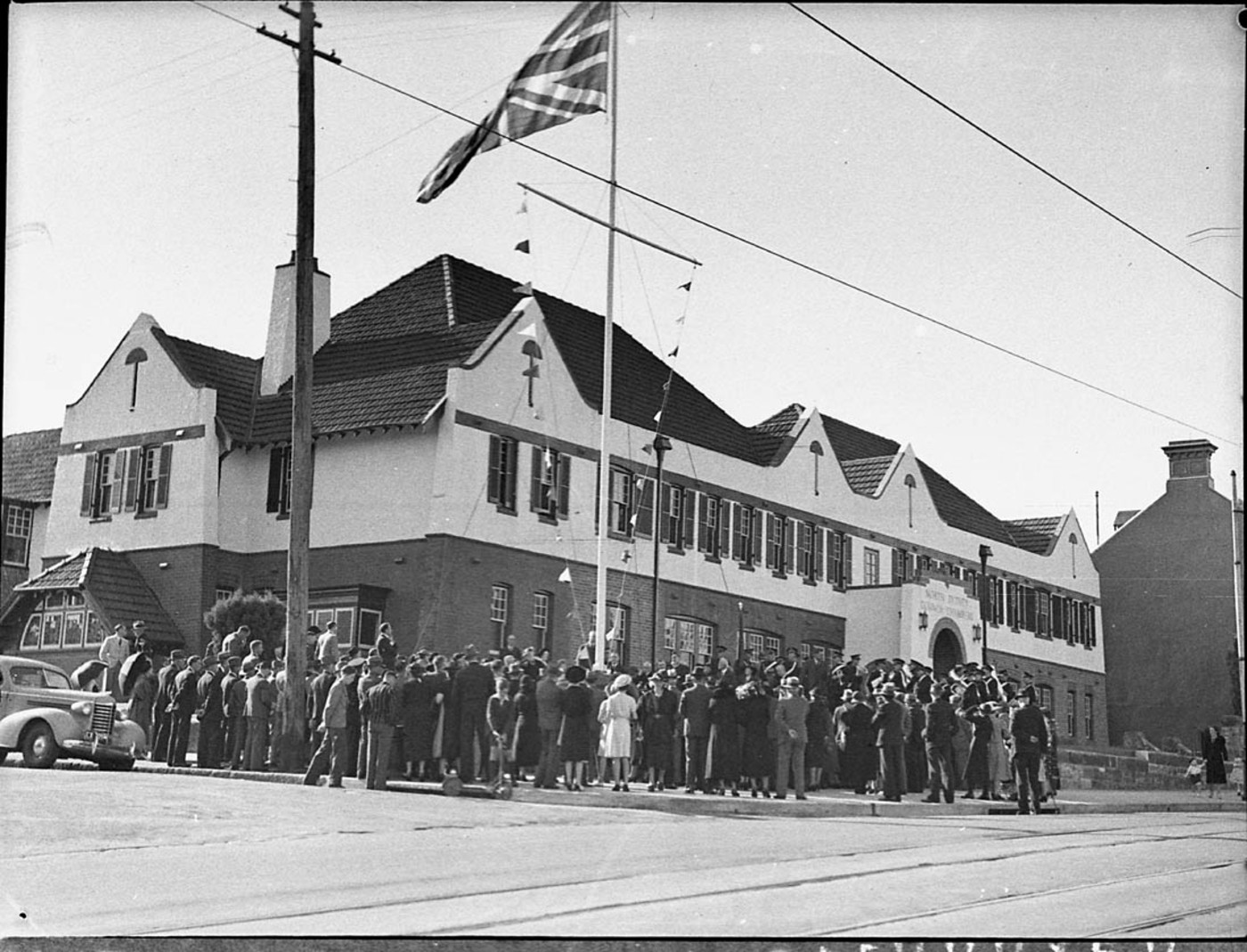
St Leonards centenary plaque unveiling by Billy Hughes, 16 October 1938.

In February 1935, Council commissioned Crows Nest architect Rupert Villiers Minnett to prepare plans for expanded accommodation. In June 1937, Minnett's plans for a mirror image extension of the existing building in the same style at a cost of £12,000 were approved by council and Girvan Brothers of St Leonards were appointed contractors for the project. The new extensions were completed by early August 1938 and were officially opened by the Secretary for Public Works and Minister for Local Government, Eric Spooner, on 13 August 1938.

On its completion, Construction noted that the "design of the existing part has been continued in the new section, which contains a spacious entrance hall panelled in Queensland maple" and praised the location and setting of the chambers "where, surrounded by gardens, they have a more domestic character than is the case with some of the other recent municipal buildings." From the upper floors, the Sydney Morning Herald noted, in a period when skylines were low, an "unimpeded view of the harbour and city." On 10 October 1938, local member Billy Hughes officially unveiled a plaque commemorating the centenary of the township of St Leonards, which was gazetted in 1838, outside the council chambers.

Further additions and extensions were carried out in 1961, 1965 and 1968 by the Council Architect, John L. Browne, who had completed the Stanton Library in 1964. The works included the addition of an aluminum framed bay window office at the corner of Miller and McLaren Streets in the original 1903 section of the council chambers, improvements to the mayoral suite, and the construction of offices behind the Miller Street wing.

=== Wyllie Wing and fire, 1975–1978 ===
The extensions made in the 1960s were aimed at easing the pressures of a lack of working space in the existing council chambers, but by the 1970s it was clear to the council that more space would be needed. As a result, a new wing facing Mclaren Street immediately west of the existing buildings, was planned and designed by Harry Seidler and Associates in 1975. The new wing, which was to be named the "Wyllie Wing" was designed by Seidler in the Brutalist Modernism style, with a series of parallel bays of concrete stepping up the site from the street frontage.

However, before this wing could be completed, on 8 April 1976 a fire destroyed the first floor and roof of the 1938 northern half of the Miller Street wing, affecting several council departments. At first, Council considered demolishing the entire Miller Street building and in September 1976 Harry Seidler and Associates prepared several schemes for its replacement, with a grassed area between a new Miller Street building and the Wyllie Wing. However, significant public opposition to the demolition of the historic council building, particularly from the North Sydney Civic Group, led to the decision to re-build the damaged portion of the Miller Street wing. The Wyllie Wing was completed in 1977 and the reconstruction of the fire-damaged section was completed in 1978.

=== Later works and extensions, 1997–date ===
On 29 July 1979, as part of the "North Sydney Civic Centre" project, a function hall was added to the rebuilt northern section of the council chambers, named the Fred Hutley Hall after the former alderman, and was opened by the local Member for Kirribili, Bruce McDonald. Later works were unveiled in September 1982 by the mayor, Ted Mack.

In 1997, council commissioned a further extension to the council chambers to fill the space between the Miller Street wing and the Wyllie Wing. Designed by North Sydney Architect Feiko Bouman, the new building was completed by Gledhill's Pty Ltd in 2000 at a cost of $2,900,000, and was named after a former mayor, Carole Baker. The North Sydney Council Chambers, along with the 1977 Wyllie Wing, are listed as heritage items in the North Sydney Local Environmental Plan 2013, and the Council Chambers was also listed on the heritage register of the National Trust of Australia (NSW).

== See also ==
- Architecture of Sydney
- Australian non-residential architectural styles
