= Warringah =

Warringah (/wəˈrɪŋɡə/ wə-RING-gə) is a name taken from the local Aboriginal word for Middle Harbour, in Sydney, New South Wales, Australia. It may refer to:

- Division of Warringah, an electoral division of the Australian House of Representatives created in 1922
- Electoral district of Warringah, a former electoral district of the New South Wales Legislative Assembly
- Warringah Council, a former local government area covering Sydney's Northern Beaches
  - Warringah Shire Hall, the former meeting place of Warringah Shire
  - Warringah Civic Centre, a civic building in Dee Why, a suburb of Sydney
- Warringah Freeway, Sydney, New South Wales
- Westfield Warringah Mall, Brookvale, on Sydney's Northern Beaches
- Warringa Ward, a former ward of North Sydney Council, New South Wales
