= Don Bank =

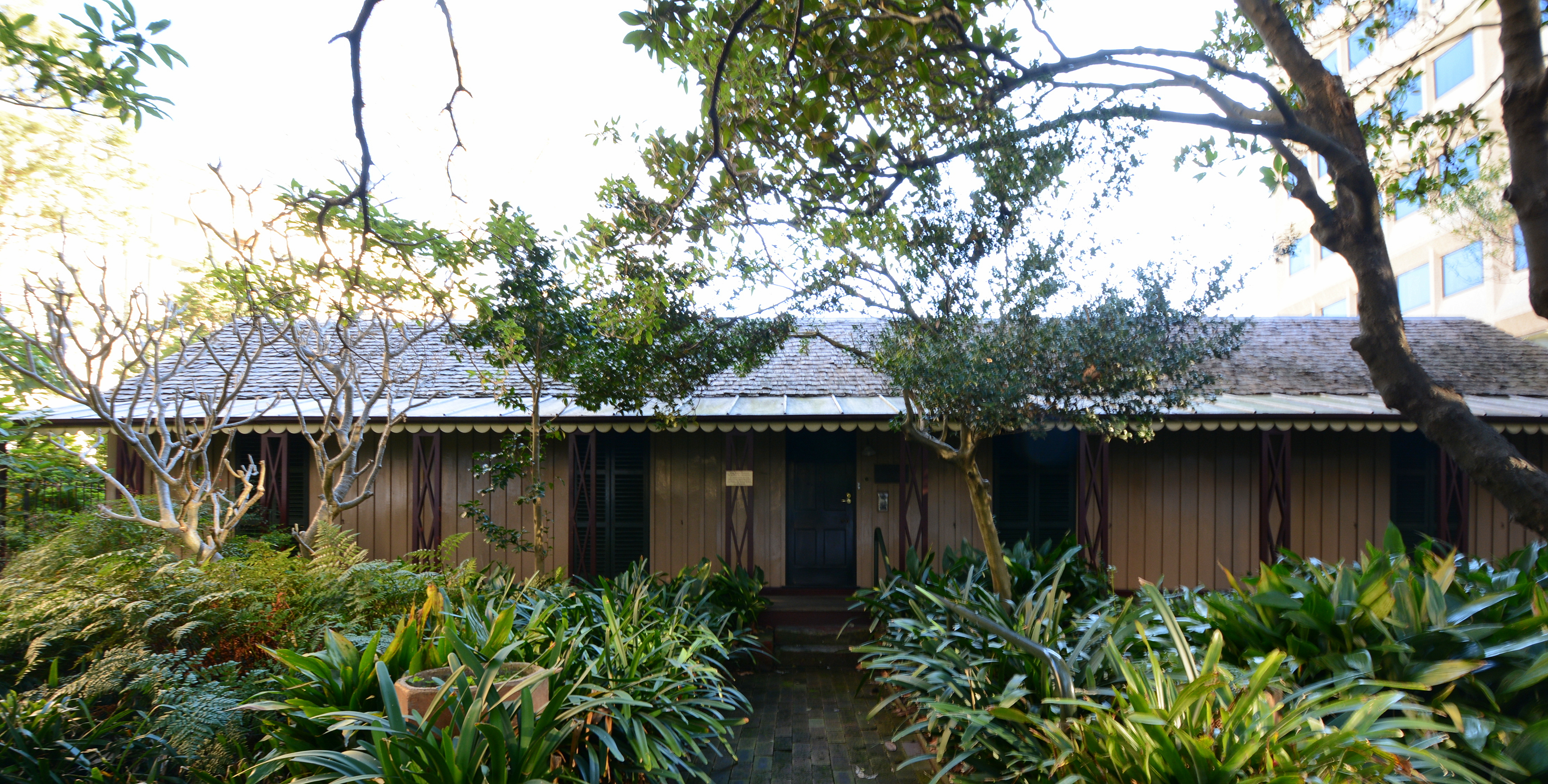
- The Don Bank museum in 2015

- Location within Sydney Location within Australia
- 33°50′16″S 151°12′19″E
- Location: 6 Napier Street, North Sydney, North Sydney Council, New South Wales, Australia

History
- Built: 1853–1858
- Built for: Edward Woolstonecroft

Site notes
- Architectural style: Victorian Georgian Revival
- Owner: North Sydney Council

New South Wales Heritage Register
- Official name: Don Bank; St. Leonard's Cottage
- Type: State heritage (built)
- Designated: 2 April 1999
- Reference no.: 31
- Type: Cottage
- Category: Residential buildings (private)

Don Bank (also known as the Don Bank Museum) is a heritage-listed former residence and now house museum at 6 Napier Street, North Sydney, New South Wales, Australia. It was built from 1853 to 1858 for Edward Wollstonecraft. It is also known as St. Leonard's Cottage. The property is owned by North Sydney Council. It was added to the New South Wales State Heritage Register on 2 April 1999.

== History ==
Edward Wollstonecraft arrived in the area and took possession of Portion 323 in September 1819, which was eventually granted to him on 30 June 1825. Don Bank was built on part of 212 hectares (524 acres) of Portion 323.

A pioneer of shipping and whaling rather than a farmer, Wollstonecraft built Crows Nest Cottage on his land (now the site of the present Presbyterian Church in Shirley Road). Don Bank was not built between 1820 and 1830 as was previously assumed; recent research based on survey plans and title investigation conclusively establish that it was built no earlier than July 1853. Also, it was extended in November 1854 when it is referred to by description in a contemporary newspaper advertisement for the sale of land and property on the North Shore by Mrs. Charlotte Carr.

In 1853 William Carr, a solicitor, purchased the site. Before completion of that sale, Don Bank was built as the intended residence of his widow, Charlotte Carr. In 1853 it became known as St. Leonard's Cottage. It is described as a four-room home in an advertisement offering it for sale in November 1854.

Room 6 (dining room), room 1 and room 7 (kitchen) were constructed between 1856 and 1858.

== Description ==
=== Site and setting, front garden ===
Don Bank is surrounded by highrise office buildings. Its primary frontage is (northeast) to Napier Street, with a secondary (rear) entrance from Oak Street to the west. The building sits north of (i.e. its southern boundary abuts) a public garden and pathway, which forms a pleasant green setting and allows pedestrian access between Napier Street and Wheeler Lane.

Neighbouring Victorian Georgian Revival style single-story identical houses are arranged in symmetrical pairs directly opposite Don Bank (at 1-7 Napier Street), forming a strong visual and contextual relationship with it. Along with the timber-fenced Victorian garden on the Napier Street frontage, Don Bank forms an oasis among highrise commercial buildings. Traffic along Napier Street is directed to the Pacific Highway to its east, a major road on North Sydney central business district. Napier Street is a one-way street parallel to the highway.

The area west of Don Bank along Oak Street displays Victorian Georgian Revival single-story houses with skillion verandahs (2-10 Oak Street). This, along with the residential character of Oak Street, retains the context of Don Bank as a former house. When built in 1853-54, Don Bank would have enjoyed sweeping views across (east) to Neutral Bay.

Don Bank's front garden is broadly a sweep of grass with various trees and shrubs dotting and edging it. An array of small trees line its front fence. More trees and shrubs are nearer the house, which is set well back from the fence and up a small slope. An Illawarra flame tree (Brachychiton acerifolius) is near the front gate. Two Lord Howe Island palms (Kentia fosteriana) are along the front path uphill.

Other trees are to the house's northern side. Old-fashioned perennials such as flowering sages (Salvia sp./cv.), bushes such as Cape leadwort or plumbago (P.capensis) grow along its front fence. Main trees comprise Californian desert fan palm (Washingtonia robusta), coastal banksia (B.integrifolia), a large old specimen to the north, crepe myrtle, (Lagerstroemia indica) and others.

=== House ===
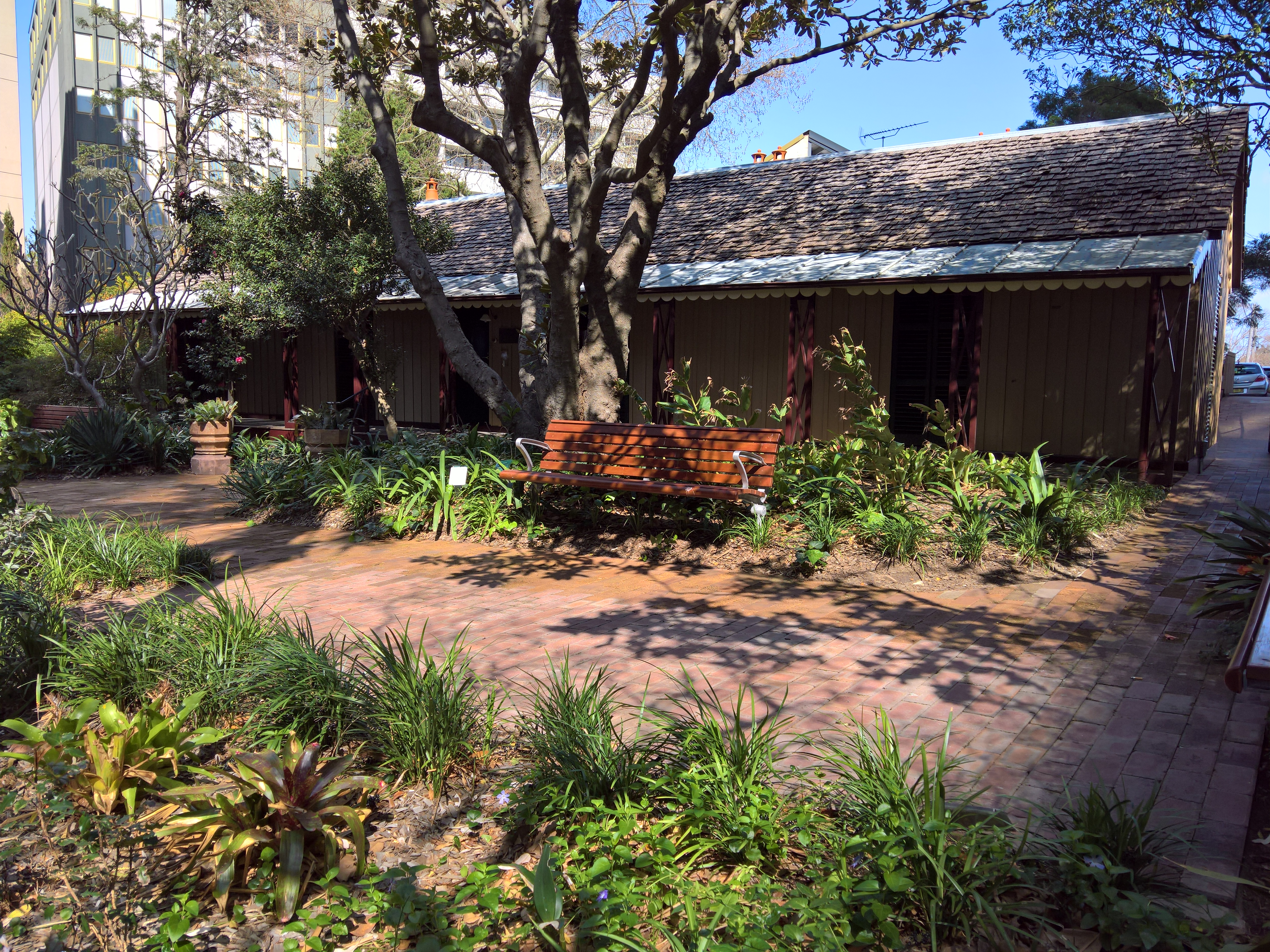
Don Bank, 2018

The house is a single-story Victorian Georgian Revival style cottage of vertical fitted slab construction with lath and plaster interior walls and red cedar joinery. A wide front door with French doors open onto a verandah across the front. The original shingle roof has been replaced with corrugated iron. The verandah has very good and rare type of timber treillage work.

The cottage is of vernacular slab construction comprising a double-pile house with gabled ends. A verandah runs the length of its front and another across most of its rear elevation. It displays many features of the Colonial Regency style, including a symmetrical facade and a four-room plan. It has a double pitched roof and a central valley, flat timber posts, and decorative fascia boards.

Its principal elevation is four-rooms wide, two rooms flanking either side of a central hall. Each room has separate access to the front verandah through French doors with full-height shutters. The detailing is minimal, presenting twin post and latticed columns supporting the verandah roof. The roof is edged with a scalloped fascia board; the bargeboard at the rear and gabled ends also is scalloped. The roof has been reshingled with she-oak (Casuarina sp.). It is believed to be the second time the roof has been re-shingled since its post-1980 restoration.

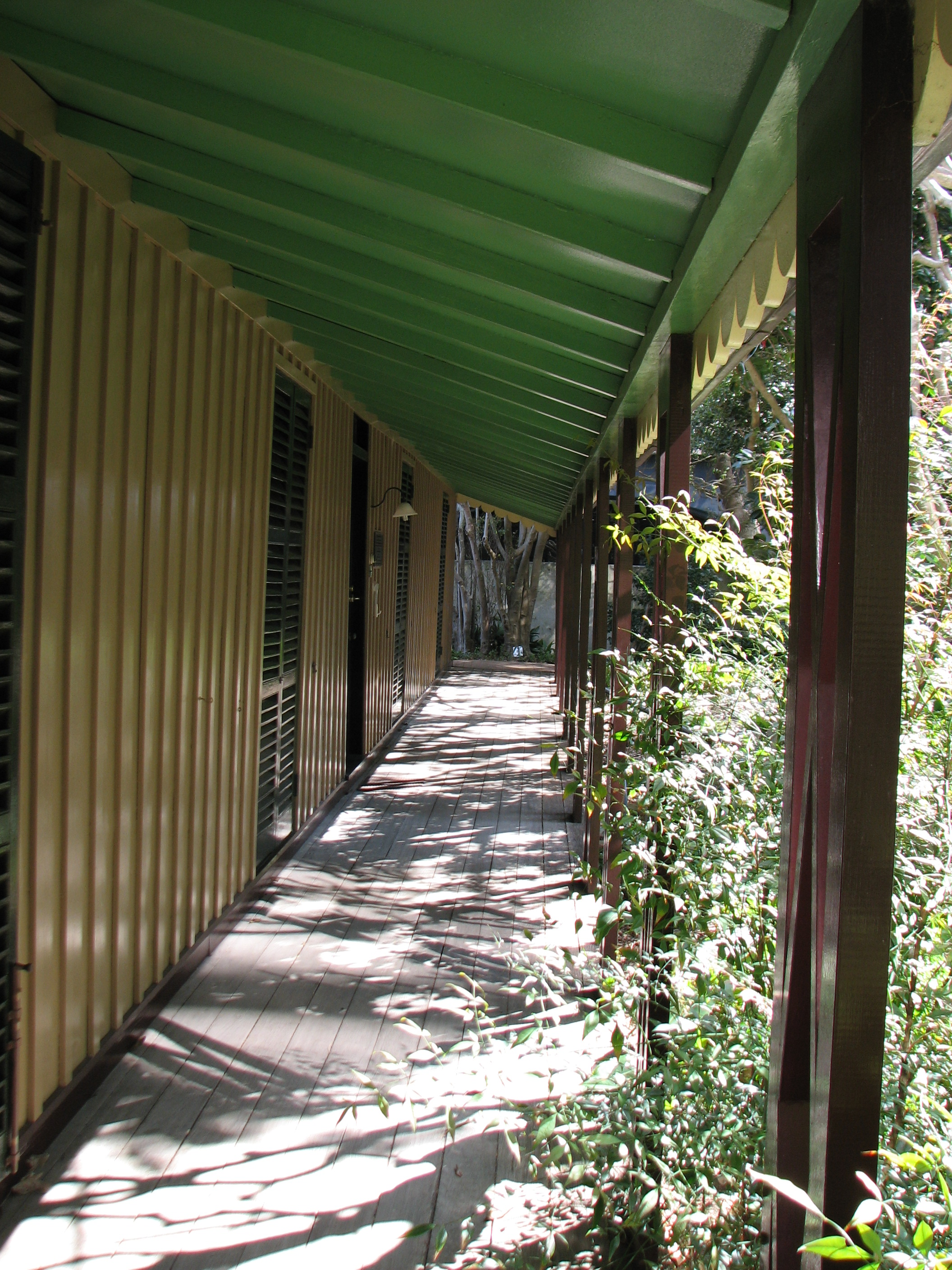
Verandah, 2018

The interior maintains its original room configuration (two rooms on either side of the central hall) with additional rooms added along the north–south axis and a kitchen wing attached perpendicular to the northernmost Room 6 (dining room). The central hall connects front and rear verandahs giving access to Rooms 2–5. It retains an original boarded ceiling and original wall boards along Room 3 and 4 walls. Calico cloth lines the walls outside Rooms 2 and 5. The cloth was hung as an interpretive element during the 1980 restoration.

It is estimated that Rooms 2–4 in the central core still retain up to 80% of their original fabric and are in good condition. The walls and ceiling of Room 2 date to the 1980s. Room 6 (dining room), 1 and 7 (kitchen) were constructed between 1856 and 1858 and refurbished during the 1980 restoration. This refurbishment included re-plastering of parts of the walls, installing plumbing, and constructing caretakers' quarters, including a toilet and kitchen at the south-west corner of the cottage.

A box gutter runs along the north–south axis of the cottage. Building fabric sitting under this has been stained in several places. Room 2 (Morning Room, now the Guides' room) has the most staining to its calico-lined ceiling and walls. Differing widths and species of timber floorboards in each room reveal something of the age and progression of construction within individual rooms. During the 1980s restoration, new timber floor was laid where deterioration and decay were substantial.

=== Modifications and dates ===
2014: the building has retained its original central core layout in spite of several additions and post-1980 restoration. A box gutter along the north–south axis has stained building fabric under it in several places.

Room 2 (morning room, now the guides' room) has the most staining to its calico-lined ceiling and walls. Differing widths and species of timber floorboards in each room reveal something of the age and progression of construction within individual rooms. During the 1980s restorations, new timber floor was laid where deterioration and decay were substantial.

Calico cloth lines walls outside Rooms 2 and 5. This was created and hung as an interpretive element during 1980 restoration. Rooms 2–4 in the central core are estimated to retain up to 80% of their original fabric and are in good condition. The walls and ceiling of Room 2 date to the 1980s. Room 6 (dining room), 1 and 7 (kitchen) were refurbished during the 1980 restoration, which included re-plastering walls (in certain places), installing plumbing and constructing caretakers' quarters (toilet and kitchen at the south-west corner of the cottage).

== Heritage listing ==
Don Bank was listed on the New South Wales State Heritage Register on 2 April 1999.

== See also ==
- Australian residential architectural styles
