= St John's Uniting Church, Neutral Bay =

St John's Uniting Church
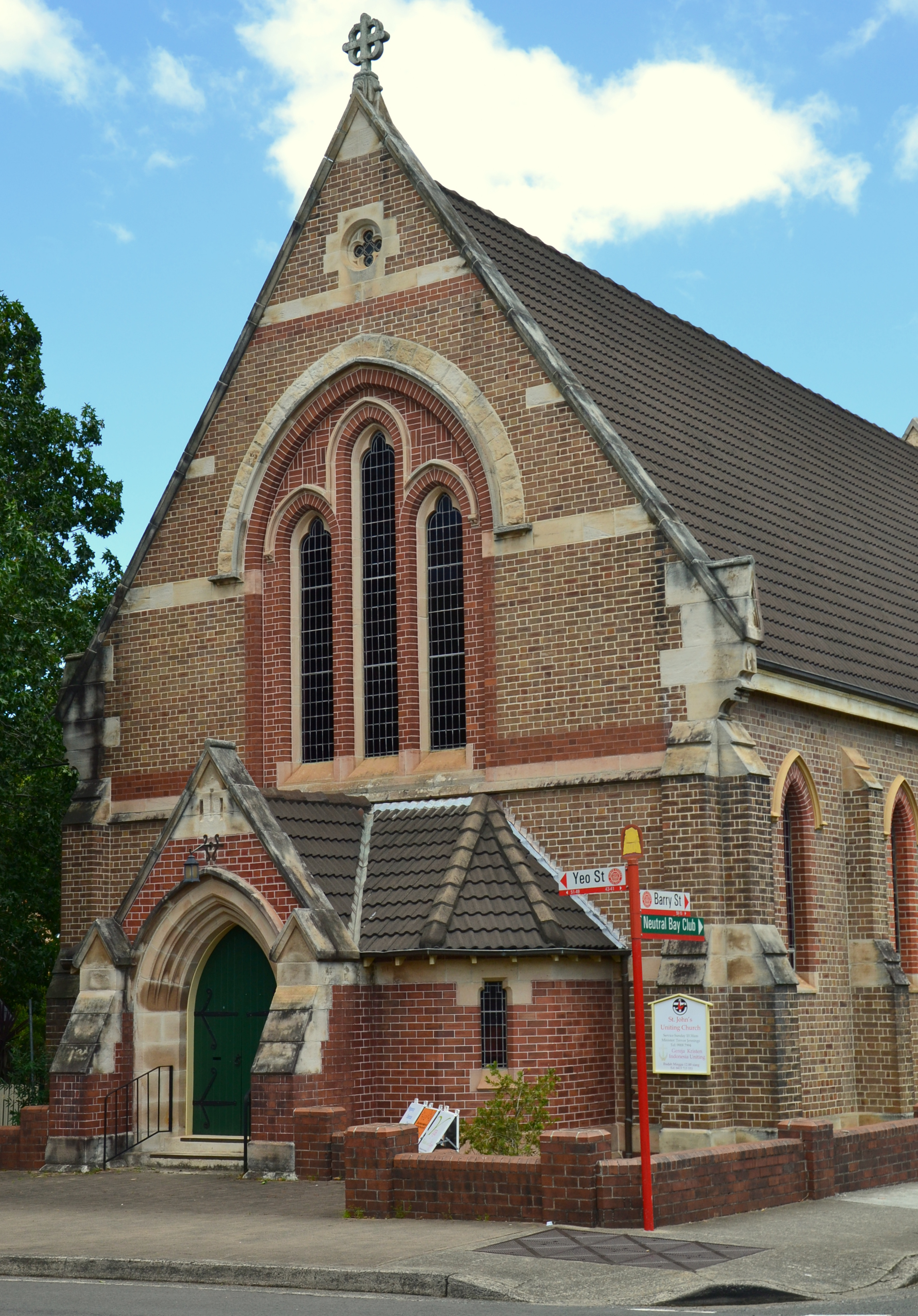
- The exterior of St John's Uniting Church, in 2012
- St John's Uniting Church
- 33°49′57″S 151°13′17″E
- Location: 49 Yeo Street, Neutral Bay, North Sydney Council, New South Wales
- Country: Australia
- Denomination: Uniting (since 1977)
- Previous denomination: Presbyterian (1980 – 1977)
- Website: www.neutralbayuniting.org.au

History
- Former name: St John's Presbyterian Church
- Status: Church
- Founded: 26 April 1890
- Dedication: 19 July 1890

Architecture
- Functional status: Active
- Architect: Charles H. Slayter
- Architectural type: Church
- Style: Victorian Free Gothic

Specifications
- Materials: Brick; slate roof, replaced by concrete tiles

New South Wales Heritage Register
- Official name: St. John's Uniting Church and Pipe Organ; Richardson Pipe Organ
- Type: State heritage (built)
- Designated: 2 April 1999
- Reference no.: 423
- Type: Church
- Category: Religion
- Builders: Tafield and Collins (church); Charles Richardson (pipe organ)

St John's Uniting Church and Pipe Organ is a heritage-listed Uniting church at Yeo Street, Neutral Bay, North Sydney Council, New South Wales, Australia. The church was built by Tafield and Collins; and the pipe organ was built by Charles Richardson. It is also known as St. John's Uniting Church and Pipe Organ and Richardson Pipe Organ. The property is owned by the Uniting Church of Australia. It was added to the New South Wales State Heritage Register on 2 April 1999.

== History ==
The Presbyterian congregation was established in Neutral Bay in 1889. Land for a church was donated by Captain Robert Craig and the foundation stone was laid on 26 April 1890. Architect was Charles H. Slatyer of 96 Pitt Street, Sydney and builders were Messrs Tafield and Collins. The church was opened on 19 July 1890. An 1890 photograph shows the church as an austere gothic structure consisting of the central four bays of the present building. It was enlarged in 1898 and in 1908. The pipe organ was installed in 1912, the manse built in 1920, and the school hall in 1923.

== Description ==
The church is a buttressed brick building with stone trims and a steep gabled roof. The interior is plastered and each bay is occupied by a memorial tablet. There is an elaborate carved pulpit and two windows in the organ chamber designed by Norman St Carter (sic) and executed by F. J. Tarrant of Darling Harbour. The diagonal boarded hammer-beam roof features nailed laminated arches.

The organ (1912) is a rare intact example of the work of Charles Richardson, who was the most prominent organ-maker in New South Wales from 1883 to 1920. It features a case design which is unique for its period, and is a late example of the use of tracker action to the manuals.

This building is designed in the Victorian Free Gothic style.

=== Modifications ===
The originally slate roof was replaced in 1979 with concrete tiles. The north end, a later addition, has a large three-light lancet window and a well-proportioned stone-trimmed entry porch. The organ chamber at the south end, also a later addition, is separately roofed.

== Heritage listing ==
The church is a competent late Victorian example of the gothic style arranged to meet Presbyterian liturgical requirements. Its corner site makes it significant in the streetscape. The use of thin laminations as an integral part of the circular arch roof structure makes the building unique for its date in structural terms. The organ is significant as being a rare intact example of the work of Charles Richardson, the most prominent organ-builder of New South Wales from 1883 to 1920. Interior detailing also of significance, including joinery.

St John's Uniting Church and Pipe Organ was listed on the New South Wales State Heritage Register on 2 April 1999.

== See also ==
- Uniting Church in Australia
