= Kailoa =

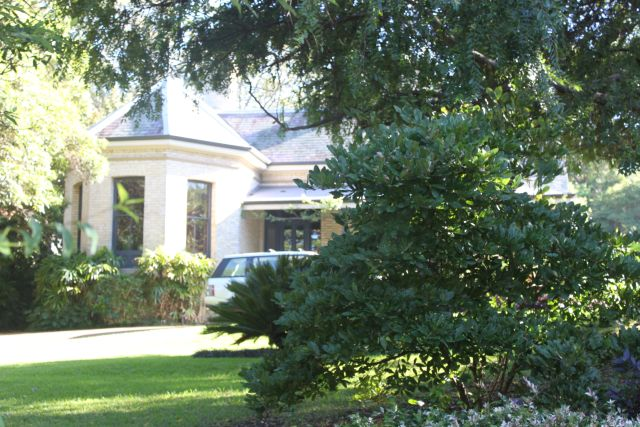

- Location within Sydney Location within Australia
- 33°50′29″S 151°12′10″E
- Location: 44 Union Street, North Sydney, North Sydney Council, New South Wales, Australia

New South Wales Heritage Register
- Official name: Kailoa
- Type: State heritage (built)
- Designated: 2 April 1999
- Reference no.: 179
- Type: Villa
- Category: Residential buildings (private)

Kailoa is a heritage-listed house at 44 Union Street, North Sydney, New South Wales, Australia. It was added to the New South Wales State Heritage Register on 2 April 1999.

== History ==
Kailoa was built in 1885 for the son of Thomas Dibbs (erstwhile premier of NSW) who owned the surrounding "Graythwaite" estate.

Shore School bought this property in 1966 and proposed to pull it down to make space for tennis courts in the late 1970s. Community opposition promoted an attempted midnight demolition by the school in January 1980, however surrounding residents responded with their own middle of the night injunction to stay the attempted demolition and a Permanent Conservation Order was eventually put in place.

Following restoration it became commercial offices and is now a private residence.

== Description ==
Garden

The 1985 garden still exhibits its early planning with many original trees surviving. There is a fine cast iron picket fence, on a stone foundation with impressive cast-rion entry gates. A curved entry driveway is planted with pygmy date palms (Phoenix roebelenii).

=== Condition ===
In 1985 the item's condition was basically "derelict"; "poor condition particularly internally of the house, detracts from its significance the dilapidated condition and extensive reconstruction required, conservation should take place within a framework of adaptation to a compatible use as a means to generate the necessary funding. Several large trees have died. The front garden still exhibits its early planning with many original trees surviving. The front fence and gates are in reasonable order ground levels around the rear of the house and heavy undergrowth are exacerbating the problems of rising damp in the adjacent rooms...

=== Modifications and dates ===
- 1985 (quoting) several large trees have died
- 1986 adaptively reused and extended for office use
- 2004 skylight inserted

== Heritage listing ==
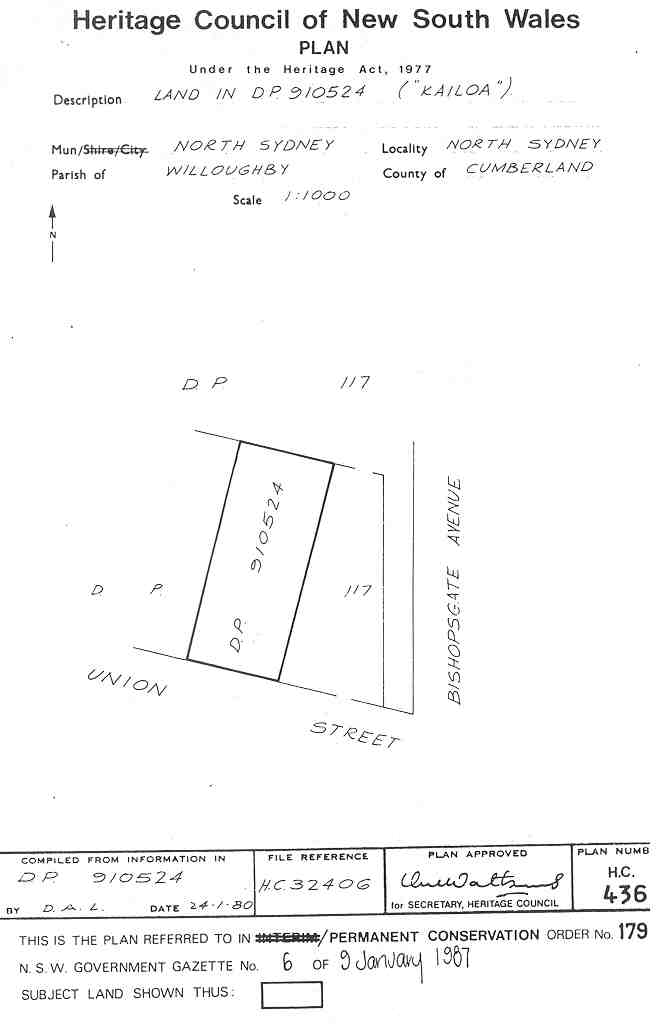
Heritage boundaries

As at 13 December 2004, Kailoa forms an integral and important part of an area with a rich and varied collection of residential architecture, the adjacent streets being a rare survival of intact 19th century townscape in North Sydney. It is a good example of its type and has retained its garden setting, being a single storey free standing Victorian Italianate villa, (c. 1885) set well back from the street on a prominent hill to the rear in landscaped grounds with a fair number of mature trees and well maintained garden setting.

It is of state historic and social significance for its associational values and representative aesthetic values of this type of place. It is of regional historic, social and associative aesthetic significance as a representative example of its period and type.

Kailoa was listed on the New South Wales State Heritage Register on 2 April 1999.
