= Primus Telecommunications (Australia) =

Australian subsidiary of the telecommunications provider

Primus Telecommunications Pty Ltd.
- Type: Subsidiary
- Industry: Telecommunications
- Founded: 1 July 1997; 29 years ago
- Headquarters: Australia
- Products: ADSL, ADSL2+, Mobile Broadband, Mobile Telephony, Fixed line, VOIP
- Number of employees: 500
- Parent: Vocus Communications
- Website: iprimus.com.au

Primus Telecommunications Pty Ltd. is an Australian telecommunications company and wholly owned subsidiary of Vocus Communications that primarily focuses on fixed, mobile, and broadband services.

Primus Telecom was the first telecommunications carrier to receive a licence when full deregulation and competition was introduced in Australia in 1997 and has network facilities across Australia. Primus operates its own fibre network in the five major capital cities; Sydney, Melbourne, Brisbane, Adelaide and Perth.

Primus is a participant in the controversial Internet censorship trials.

== History ==
=== Market entry (1997–1999) ===
Primus originally entered the Australian telecommunications market in 1996 by acquiring Australia's fourth-largest telecommunications service provider, Axicorp. Primus Telecom was one of the first carriers to be granted a telecommunications licence in 1997. Prior to this, Australia's telecommunications industry was operated as a duopoly⠀ between the former Australian Government-owned Telecom Australia, later rebranded Telstra and Optus, before the market was opened to full competition in July 1997.

1998 saw Primus expand their operations further in Australia with the acquisition of Eclipse Telecommunications Pty. Ltd. and Hotkey Internet Services Pty Limited.

In 1999 Primus' parent company Primus Telecommunications Inc. purchased the retail operations of Telegroup Inc., a long-distance telephone company based in Fairfield, Iowa, which was in Chapter 11 bankruptcy. This acquisition included the Australian subsidiary of Telegroup which allowed Primus to improve their capabilities in the Australian market.

1999 was also the year Primus Australia's U.S. parent company launched the iPrimus brand to spearhead the organisation's strategy of aggressively gaining retail market share by offering 'one-stop' shopping for bundled voice, data, Internet and cellular services.

=== Primus' growth (2000–2003) ===
During the period from 2000–2003, Primus achieved some significant growth. They were one of many telco providers to benefit from the collapse of One. Tel by actively pursuing those customers left in a lurch. They used this inertia to grow their customer base to approximately 750,000 retail customers including over 400,000 Internet customers by 2003.

=== Industry consolidation (2004–2008) ===
In February 2004, AOL|7 was purchased by Primus Telecom. This acquisition added approximately 90,000 customers to Primus' existing residential iPrimus customer base.

Primus' acquisition would coincide with much industry consolidation as competitor Telstra purchased a 50% stake in mobile provider Hutchison 3G for A$450 million, Kaz Group for A$333 million and Damovo for A$64 million. Meanwhile, competitor Optus purchased Uecomm for A$227 million, a 50.8% stake in Alphawest and A$50 million for the remaining 74% of Virgin Mobile Australia.

In early 2007, Primus sold PlanetDomain to NetRegistry for over A$8 million.

In late 2008, Primus acquired Imagineering Data Centre, a Melbourne-based hosting and colocation provider.

=== Acquisition of iPrimus (2012–present) ===
On 16 April 2012, it was announced that Primus Telecom would be purchased by M2 Group in preparation for the National Broadband Network. Primus Telecom was acquired by M2 on 1 June 2012 for $192 million.

In 2012 iPrimus in conjunction with Hungry Jack's launched a free Wi-Fi service in 348 stores, as part of a $6 million contract with Hungry Jack's parent company, Competitive Foods Australia.

In February 2016, M2 Group merged with Vocus Communications, resulting in iPrimus becoming part of the Vocus Group.

== Residential products ==
=== Broadband ===
iPrimus is one of Australia's largest telecommunications carriers and offers high-speed broadband through ADSL and ADSL2+, as well as NakedDSL and 3G mobile broadband. Primus's DSLAM network is one of the largest in Australia, with more than 66 exchanges.

=== Fixed line and mobile ===
The iPrimus mobile network is a virtual network operator and uses the Optus network, with 2G and 3G capabilities. Primus Telecom also offers a range of home phone and VoIP services.

=== Other services ===
iPrimus also offers add-on services including anti-virus and anti-spam filtering, dial-up Internet connection, WebFilter proxy, global roaming and wireless hotspot access. FetchTV is available to iPrimus broadband customers.

== Business Products ==
=== Internet & Data ===
iPrimus offers business services including ADSL, ADSL2+, SHDSL, FTTH, Mobile Broadband, and a variety of internet services including Private IP Networks, Domain Names & Web Hosting, Cloud Computing, Virtual Hosting, Dedicated Hosting, Co-Location and Managed Services. Mobility Services by Primus Telecom have recently included Blackberry solutions and dedicated Mobile business plans.

=== Voice ===
Accella® is the iPrimus brand for business IP, voice and data services.

Primus Telecom services include PSTN, ISDN, SIP Trunks, Hosted IP Phone Systems, Inbound 1300/1800, Intelligent network. Primus Accella operates as the Business Voice service for Primus Telecom and is a business-grade hosted communications solution.

== Awards ==
Year	Award	Description	Organisation	Reference
2012	#1 Home Phone Provider	Best home phone provider based on customer satisfaction in the month of February 2012.	Roy Morgan	
2012	#1 Home Phone Provider	Best home phone provider based upon customer satisfaction in the month of March 2012.	Roy Morgan	
2012	#1 Home Phone Provider	Best home phone provider based upon customer satisfaction in the month of April 2012.	Roy Morgan	
2012	Best Home Broadband <20GB	Best Home Broadband for the <20GB category	your money Magazine	

== See also ==
- M2 Group
- Broadband Internet Access (Australia)
