= Airtasker =

Australian outsourcing company

- Company type: Public
- Website type: Community marketplace
- Traded as: ASX: ART
- Founded: 2012
- Headquarters: Sydney, New South Wales, Australia
- Country of origin: Australia
- Area served: Australia, UK, Ireland, Singapore, United States, New Zealand
- Founders: Tim Fung, Jonathan Lui
- Chairperson: Cass O'Connor
- CEO: Tim Fung
- Net income: ▼$23,536,669 (FY 2018)
- Employees: 175
- Website: www.airtasker.com
- Users: 2,000,000
- Launched: 2012

Airtasker is a Sydney-based Australian company which provides an online and mobile marketplace, enabling users to outsource everyday tasks. Users describe the task and indicate a budget; community members then bid to complete the task.

Airtasker was founded in 2012 by Australian entrepreneurs Tim Fung and Jonathan Lui and has raised AUD $65 million, to date, in 2017.

== History ==
Co-founders Tim Fung and Jonathan Lui devised the Airtasker concept in 2011, when they relocated apartments and realised that many of the related tasks could be outsourced to other people. Funding for the venture was facilitated by existing relationships with investors, forged by Fung and Lui's shared workplace, the mobile start-up Amaysim. The team successfully raised AUD $1.5 million two months after launch and began expanding its offering to cater for businesses as well as individuals.

The company acquired rival company TaskBox for an undisclosed sum in February 2013, and the Melbourne-based Occasional Butler in 2014.

Airtasker partnered with Australian jobs listing website CareerOne in July 2013 which gave the platform further exposure to the casual jobs market. By late 2013 Airtasker had closed a second round of funding raising a further AUD $2 million, bringing total investment in the company to AUD $3.5 million and valuing it at $10 million.

In 2017, Sydney company Freelancer alleged that Airtasker misappropriated confidential information in the usage of the term "Like a boss" in their advertising campaign. Airtasker lodged an opposition to Freelancer's "Like a boss" trademark, which was still in correspondence process with IP Australia in December 2018.

In July 2018, some of Airtasker's Australian data may have been compromised in a Typeform data breach.

In December 2018, the Australian Taxation Office audited Airtasker and requested the repayment of Research and Development rebates.

== Bidding process ==
The Airtasker process begins when a user posts a job they need completed, setting a suggested payment as well as any details needed to make a decision. Other users can post their interest in completing the task along with their own suggestions on the payment amount. The user who posted the task can make a decision on who to award the task to based on the applicant's profile, task history and ratings. Once this decision is made, the Airtasker platform allows private communication and payment to be made between the parties. It is free for users and applicants to join Airtasker but once a task is successfully completed and paid, all taskers must face a 22% service fee with GST settlement unless they make over $1000, in which case they face a 20% reduction instead. This is the deduction for a silver tiered Tasker, but there are also gold and platinum tiered Taskers, and they face an 18% and 15% task deduction respectively for their services for the community.

Airtasker has obtained insurance cover via CGU that provides up to $10 million in coverage to protect Taskers on the Airtasker marketplace for their liability to third parties, for personal injury or property damage when performing a task.

== Investment and results ==
In April 2012, Airtasker raised AUD $1.5 million, acquired 45,000 users and processed AUD $1 million in Australian jobs (two months after launch). By November 2013 the company had raised a further AUD $2 million for a total of $3.5 million in funds raised, valuing the company at AUD $10 million.

In February 2013, Airtasker acquired competitor TaskBox.

In July 2014, Airtasker acquired Melbourne-based odd jobs outsourcing business Occasional Butler and claimed to have 130,000 community members and an annual task run rate of over $4 million.

In May 2015, Airtasker raised $6.5 million in a round led by Shanghai-based Morning Crest Capital and the NRMA. Airtasker claimed to have 250,000 users and to process $15 million worth of tasks a year.

In June 2016, Airtasker raised $22 million in a series B investment led by Seven West Media for a 15% stake. Airtasker claimed to have 600,000 community members and more than $40m annual transaction volume.

In October 2017, Airtasker raised $33 million to enable the company to expand to Britain.

In June 2018, there were about 2,000,000 users.

In 2018, total revenue for Airtasker was $11,424,440 versus $5,468,341 in 2017. The operating loss in 2018 was $23,536,669 compared to $12,846,493 in 2017.
