= Ildemere =

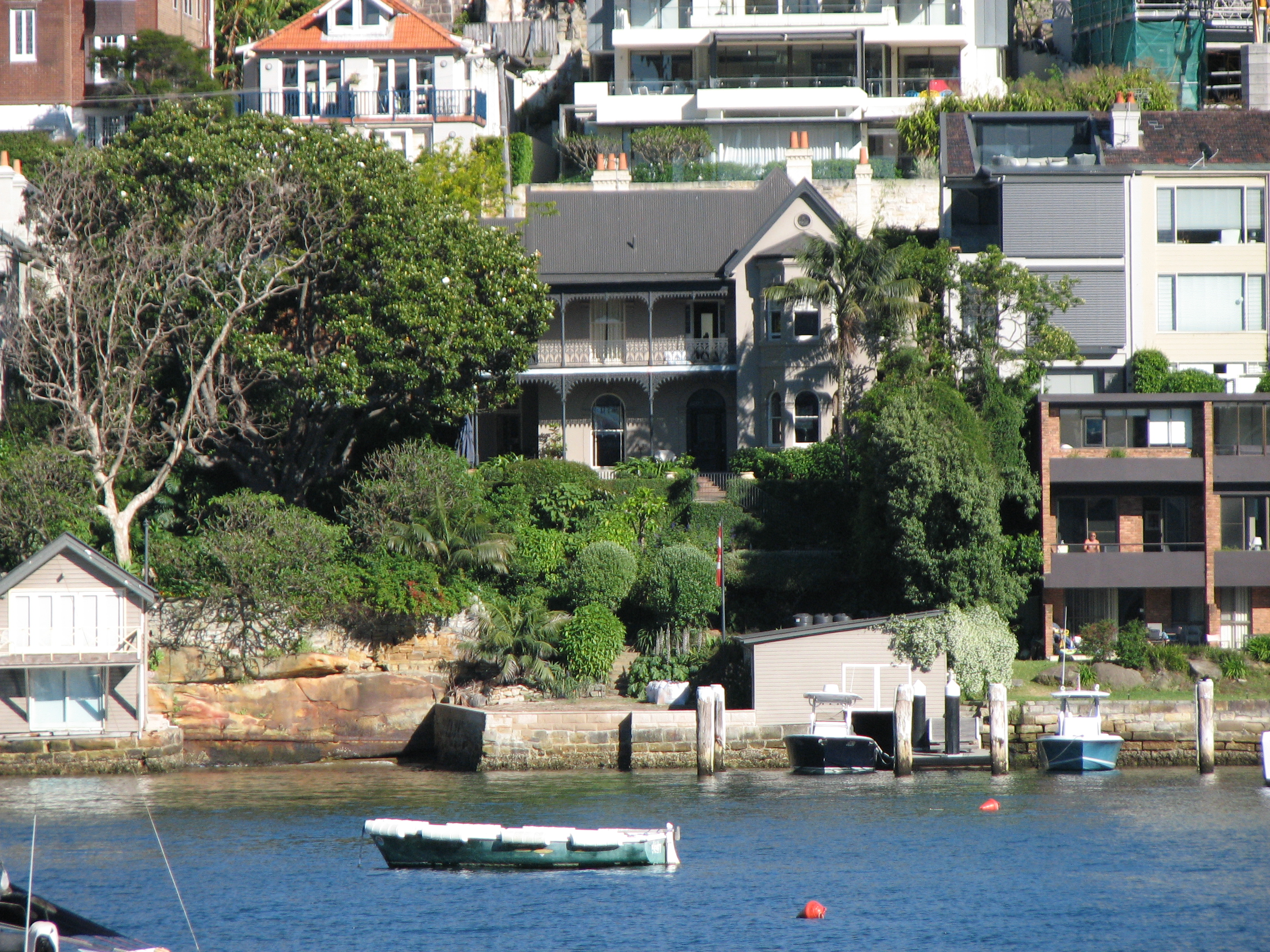
- Ildemere, with the boat shed on the right and "Ildemere Cabin" on the left.

- Location within Sydney Location within Australia
- 33°50′43″S 151°12′22″E
- Location: 11-11a Bay View Street, McMahons Point, New South Wales, Australia

History
- Built: 1879–1888

Site notes
- Architectural style: Victorian Filligree

New South Wales Heritage Register
- Official name: Ildemere
- Type: State heritage (built)
- Designated: 2 April 1999
- Reference no.: 390
- Type: House
- Category: Residential buildings (private)

Ildemere is a heritage-listed residence at 11–11a Bay View Street, McMahons Point, New South Wales, Australia. It was built between 1879 tand 1888.

== History ==
John Carr of Sydney, ship chandler, sold the property to Edwin Maximilian Dietrich, jeweller, in 1879. The house was built c. 1879 and Dietrich occupied it until 1897. It was owned by William Percy Maschwitz from 1897 to 1906, and by C. W. Gaden from 1906. Additions including the terrazzo verandah floor with its swastika and coat of arms were probably made by Dietrich in the 1890s, as the coat of arms resembles a Dietrich coat of arms shown in Planches de l'armorial generale de J B Reitstap. There is some slight evidence that the c. 1879 work may have been by architect David McBeath. There is no evidence that the building was ever a German Consulate.

Cricket player Don Bradman lived at Ildemere from 1932–1934. The Bradman family rented the downstairs area of the house from the Allan family who were the owners at that time.

== Description ==
=== House (c. 1879) ===
Fine example of Victorian waterfront mansion with individual details of particular interest. Important as the last of the type along this foreshore especially as its waterfront and boatshed are intact. Significant garden. Associated with prominent Sydney jeweller and resident. Visually prominent from the water which is its dominant aspect.

This building is designed in the Victorian Filligree style.

Architectural evidence suggests an 1880s house with Federation period extensions. A two-storey brick building, rendered to imitate ashlar on the main (east) side; colonial bond painted brick with boxed eaves on north side; two-storey south section of Edwardian character of stretcher bond painted brick with exposed rafters. Complex iron roof and corbelled brick chimneys. Windows variously round-arched and double hung, or casement; south side has a large Edwardian round-arched window. Facetted bay front on the eastern side. two-storey verandah to front and side with cast iron posts, balustrade, brackets and valances, has a terrazzo floor in which are inlaid a swastika, a German coat of arms, and the name Ildemere in front of the front door. The house has an excellent mature terraced garden and a two-storey weatherboard boatshed (shown in a 1911 photo).

=== Boat House (1888) ===
One of the few surviving waterfront boathouses of the nineteenth century which besides being relatively intact, is also still part of its original property and generally retains its context. Two storey weatherboard building with corrugated-iron gable roof. It sits on the waters edge above a sandstone seawall and has been modified for residential use by the insertion of windows to the end elevation, with upper floor balcony carried on diagonal struts. The ground floor waters edge door has been modified by the insertion of full length doors but the fixtures for a pontoon ramp remain on the base timber beam.

=== Modifications and dates ===
Major alterations - sympathetic/ weatherboard boatshed has been altered, including the addition of windows in the north side. There is also a smaller boatshed of fibro and corrugated iron, probably built to cover a pre-existing slipway.

=== Further information ===
Boat House built as extension of and in relation to the house, and retains this relationship.

== Heritage listing ==
Ildemere was listed on the New South Wales State Heritage Register on 2 April 1999 having satisfied the following criteria.

The place is important in demonstrating the course, or pattern, of cultural or natural history in New South Wales.

This item is assessed as historically rare locally.

The place has a strong or special association with a person, or group of persons, of importance of cultural or natural history of New South Wales's history.

Associative regionally.

The place is important in demonstrating aesthetic characteristics and/or a high degree of creative or technical achievement in New South Wales.

This item is assessed as aesthetically rare locally.

The place possesses uncommon, rare or endangered aspects of the cultural or natural history of New South Wales.

Historically rare locally.

The place is important in demonstrating the principal characteristics of a class of cultural or natural places/environments in New South Wales.

Representative regionally - historically and aesthetically. This item is assessed as socially representative locally.

== See also ==
- Australian residential architectural styles
