= James Spenceley =

Australian politician and investor

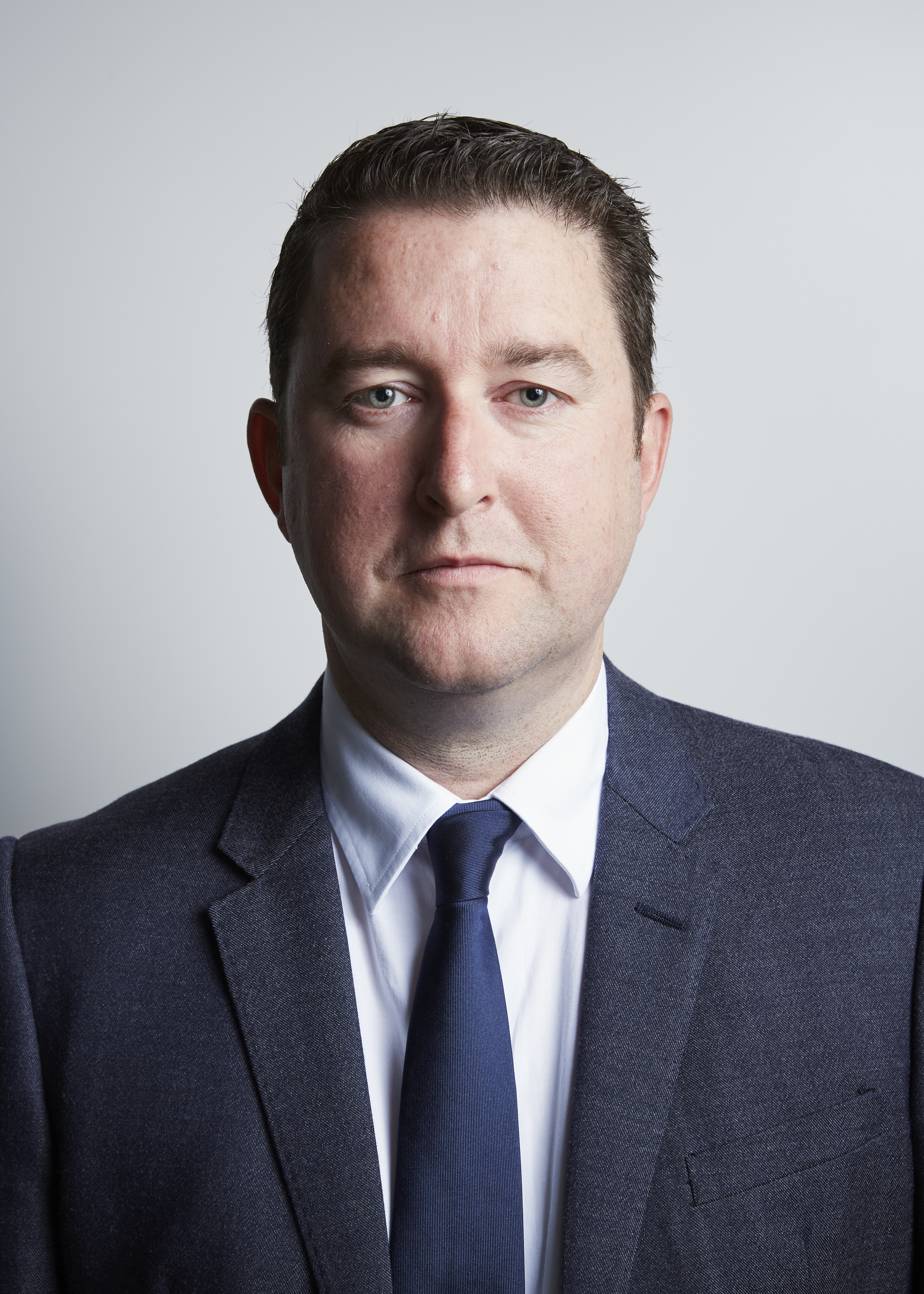

Councillor of North Sydney Council for St Leonards Ward
- Incumbent
- Assumed office 4 December 2021

Personal details
- Born: James Roland Travers Spenceley; 1975 or 1976 (age 49–50) Sydney, Australia
- Party: Independent
- Occupation: Venture capitalist, entrepreneur
- Known for: Founder of Vocus Group

James Roland Travers Spenceley is an Australian investor, entrepreneur, company director, and politician. He is the founder of Vocus Communications and an active venture capital investor. He was a seed investor in Airtasker in 2012, and was chairman of the board from 2015 until 2023, when he resigned his position in order to concentrate on his humanitarian aid organisation Aus Ukraine Aid. In December 2021, Spenceley was elected in first position as a councillor for St Leonards Ward of North Sydney Council, and was re-elected in October 2024.

== Early life and education ==
James Roland Travers Spenceley was born in Sydney, Australia.

== Career ==
=== Vocus ===
Spenceley is most widely known for his role as the founder and former CEO of Australia's 4th largest fixed line telecommunications company Vocus Communications. On 25 June 2021 Vocus was acquired by Macquarie Infrastructure and Real Assets (MIRA) and Aware Super for $3.5 billion.

Spenceley started Vocus in September 2007, when he sold his house to initially fund the business. The company listed on the Australian Stock Exchange (ASX) in 2010. When he stepped down as CEO of Vocus in March 2016 the company had revenues of greater than $1.8 billion.

=== Illawarra Hawks ===
Spenceley purchased the Wollongong Hawks (now Illawarra Hawks) NBL basketball team in July 2014 right before the start of the 2014/2015 season. In October 2014, he laid out his plan to win a Grand Final within 3 years. The team finished last in the 2014/2015 season, 4th in the 2015/2016 season and was runner up in the 2016/2017 season losing in the Grand Final to the Perth Wildcats. In February 2018, Spenceley announced he had sold his interest in the Illawarra Hawks.

=== Other ventures ===
Spenceley was a seed investor in Airtasker in 2012, and was chairman of the board from July 2015 until June 2023.

Spenceley is an active venture capital investor. As of 2018 he had investments in Beforepay; the meal kit delivery service Marley Spoon; the online and indoor vertical farming startup Sustenir; and several other businesses. As of 2023 he was on the boards of Kogan.com and Swoop Telecom.

In early 2021 the Australian Financial Review reported that Spenceley was preparing to list the wireless Telco Swoop Telecom on the ASX with the backing of Tattarang, the family office of Andrew Forrest. The business listed on the ASX under the code SWP, raising $20m and was up 150% on its first day of trading.

== Politics ==
Spenceley announced in June 2021 that he was running as an independent for a position on North Sydney Council at the upcoming local government election. At the subsequent election held on 4 December 2021, Spenceley was elected in first position as a councillor for St Leonards Ward of North Sydney Council.

He was re-elected on 5 October 2024, as one of five selected from 20 candidates.

== Other activities ==
In 2017 and 2018 he was a national judge for the Australian Ernst & Young Entrepreneur of the Year Award.

He stepped down from his position as chair of the Airtasker board in mid-2023 in order to focus on the humanitarian organisation which he had founded, Aus Ukraine Aid. The organisation focuses on aid to Ukrainians affected by the Russian invasion of Ukraine.

== Recognition and rankings ==
- 2018 Voted by The Daily Telegraph newspaper as 11th most influential person on Sydney's North Shore
- 2018 Inducted to the Telecommunications Hall of Fame
- 2016 listed at number 51 of Financial Review Rich List of 100 wealthiest Australian's under 40
- 2015 Ernst & Young Australian Entrepreneur of the Year Winner (Listed)
- 2015 Ranked #8 AFR CEO's who deliver list
- 2013 Ranked #81 BRW Young Rich List
- 2011 Debuted at #91 on BRW Young Rich List
- 2010 Ernst & Young Australian Entrepreneur of the Year Winner (Young)

== Personal life ==
Spenceley's wife is Ukrainian.
