= Stanton Library =

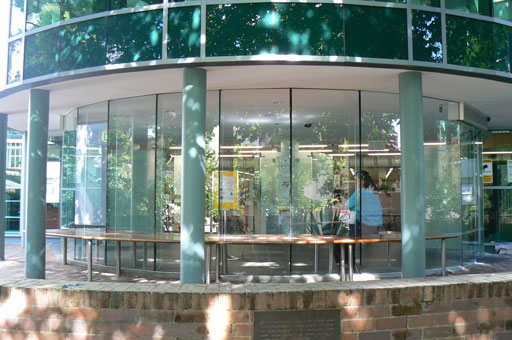
- Stanton Library entrance 2008
- 33°50′00″S 151°12′27″E
- Established: 8 February 1964

Collection
- Size: 167,000 (2014)

Other information
- Website: www.northsydney.nsw.gov.au/library Building details

General information
- Architectural style: Post-War International (1964); Late Twentieth-Century Structuralist (1988)
- Location: 234 Miller Street, North Sydney
- Opened: 8 February 1964

Design and construction
- Architect: John L. Browne
- Main contractor: J.P. Cordukes Pty. Ltd.

Renovating team
- Architect: Feiko Bouman (1987–1988)

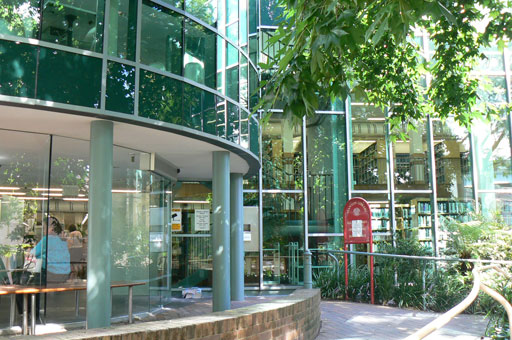
Stanton Library front 2008

The Stanton Library in North Sydney, NSW, Australia is the public library service of North Sydney Council. Established in 1964, it was named after the Mayor of North Sydney from 1937 to 1939, James Street Stanton, who was a supporter of the Free library movement.

== History ==
In 1996 Nora Hinchen became Chief Librarian of Stanton Library, North Sydney, a position she held for over 20 years. Nora spoke at the 11th Australian Library History Forum held at the State Library of New South Wales on 18 and 19 November 2014. Her paper, Keep Stanton Free’ is ‘a story of a principle that became civic right, one man’s relentless opposition to the North Sydney Library service, political manoeuvres, a local government election and referendum and the efforts, sometimes open, sometimes covert, of a group of concerned citizens and librarians to ensure that public libraries remained free’.

Gough Whitlam provided the historical background in his 1986 paper ‘The Munn-Pitt Report – 50 years on’. He wrote ‘The most immediate reaction to the Munn-Pitt Report was the establishment, in Sydney, of the Free Public Library Movement’. He set this in context:

‘In 1934 Ralph Munn, Director of the Pittsburg Public Library was invited to Australia to make a survey of our libraries and make recommendation for their improvement. The survey was promoted by the Australian Council for Educational Research and funded by the Carnegie Corporation. Munn was assisted by Ernest Pitt, Principal Librarian of the Public Library of Victoria. Its public campaign let to a State Committee of Inquiry in 1938 and a to a Library Act in 1939 which authorised a subsidy for local authorities which spent some of their rates on public libraries… The subsidy provisions in New South Wales were proclaimed to come into force in 1944. After the ware there was a general movement by councils to adopt the Act and claim the subsidy’.

Nora Hinchen describes the relentless opposition Stanton Library faced from Alderman Michael Fitzpatrick who described the Library as ‘an octopus round the necks of the ratepayers.’ He was largely responsible for the 'various delays' in opening the Library and proposed that the August 1983 North Sydney Council Elections should have a referendum including, one question which was compulsory: ‘Should North Sydney Council revoke the Library Act 1939, in order that a scale of fees and charges can be levied for the use of Stanton Library services?’

The Keep Stanton Free Committee was formed with a few concerned citizens, including Nora and they rapidly devised a campaign, just seven weeks before the election. The Referendum was a resounding success for the principle of free public libraries: 87.5% voted NO to imposing charges.

In November 1943, three months after Stanton's death, North Sydney Council voted to create a library, with planning starting in 1945 on the "Stanton Memorial Library" as a part of a broader "Civic Centre" planned for the site on Miller Street bounded by Maclaren and Ridge streets at an estimated cost of £20,000. However, various delays including land acquisition issues meant that the "Civic Centre" plans never came to be fully realised, and the Stanton Library was not opened until 8 February 1964, when Governor Sir Eric Woodward performed the honours.

The first library building was of a striking modernist design, with a curtain wall facade. Designed by Council architect John L. Browne, it was built by J.P. Cordukes Pty. Ltd. of Concord, and the interior designed by Marion Hall Best. In 1987, mayor Ted Mack commissioned construction on alterations and additions to the 1964 library, designed by Feiko Bouman, which were completed in 1988.
