= Vocus Group =

Australian telecommunications company

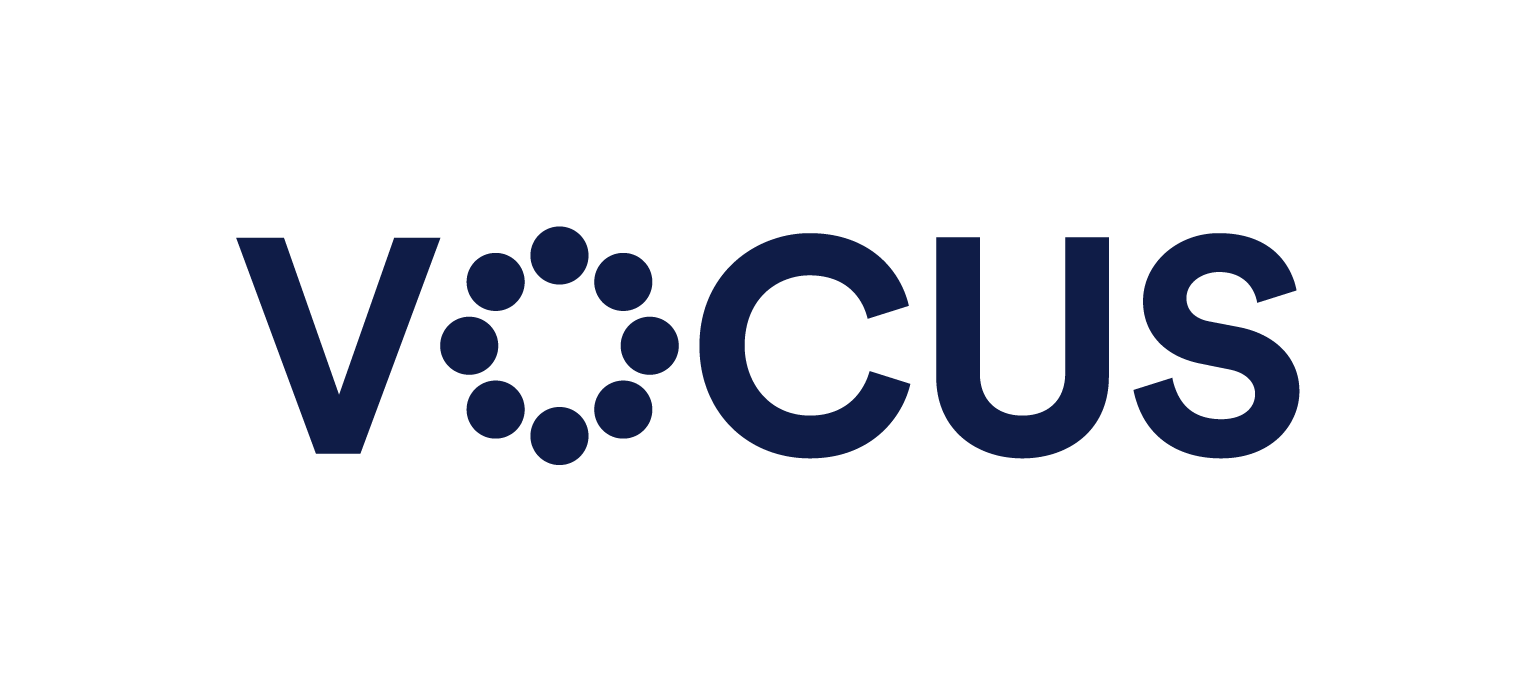
- Type: Private
- ISIN: AU000000VOC6
- Industry: Diversified Telecommunication Services
- Founded: 2008; 18 years ago
- Founder: James Spenceley
- Headquarters: Melbourne, Victoria, Australia
- Area served: Australia
- Key people: Andrés Irlando (CEO); JP Moorhead (CFO)
- Products: Backhaul; Broadband; Cloud; Data centre; Voice
- Brands: Dodo; Commander; iPrimus; Vocus; AAPT; PIPE Networks; Vision Network
- Owner: Macquarie Group; Aware Super
- Parent: Voyage Australia Pty Limited
- Divisions: Wholesale & Infrastructure; Enterprise & Government; Retail
- Subsidiaries: Nextgen Networks
- Website: www.vocus.com.au

Vocus Group, formerly known as Vocus Communications, is a telecommunications company headquartered in Melbourne, Australia.

Vocus Communications was founded by James Spenceley as a wholesale, enterprise, government, business and consumer telecommunications provider.

As at May 2025, Vocus owns and manages Australia's second largest intercapital fibre network.

Vocus provides wholesale, enterprise, government, business and consumer telecommunications services across Australia, and on international subsea cable systems between the United States and Asia Pacific.

Vocus offers data network services such as Internet, dark fibre, IP WAN, unified communications and telephony and cloud services to mid, large and corporate businesses direct and also acts as a wholesaler.

The company owns and operates 18 data centres across Australia and has an onshore Network Operations Centre.

In 2015, Vocus Communications acquired Perth-based Amcom.

Vocus Communications merged with M2 Group on 22 February 2016 in a merger worth AU$3.75 billion, before which it reported profits of AU$62.25M.

This merger made Vocus Group Australia's fourth largest telecommunications company.

In October 2016, the company acquired Nextgen Networks for $861 million. This acquisition provided Vocus access to the National Broadband Network backhaul and infrastructure in Northern Australia, including that serving the offshore gas projects.

In 2021, Vocus Group was acquired by Voyage Australia Pty Limited, a consortium of Macquarie Infrastructure and Real Assets (MIRA) and superannuation fund Aware Super and de-listed from the ASX.

In August 2025, Vocus Group completed the acquisition of TPG Telecom’s Enterprise, Government and Wholesale fixed business and associated fibre assets for A$5.25bn. As a result, Vocus operate more than 50,000km of owned fibre, nearly 15,000km of global submarine cables and close to 20,000 connected buildings, thus making it Australia's 2nd largest Telco by total subscriber volume. The acquisition included Vision Network’s wholesale residential broadband reach, with assets in major capital cities and Canberra, Ballarat, Mildura, and Geelong.

== History ==
Vocus was founded by entrepreneur James Spenceley in March 2008. In 2013, Spenceley came in at No 81 on the BRW's Young Rich list after the business raised its annual revenue to $67 million. Two years later, Spenceley became one of the youngest Australians in history to run a company worth more than $1 billion after Vocus merged with Perth-based Amcom.

Amcom was founded in 1988 by Andrew Mclean to provide cabling services to CBD-based corporations and institutions in Perth. Amcom acquired a telecommunications carrier licence in 1998 and began building a fibre optic network. In 2009 Amcom won the Best Telecommunications Company of the Year 2009 - Australian Telecommunications Magazine.

In December 2014, the board of Amcom approved the acquisition of the group by Vocus for AU$653 million. In April 2015, rival TPG Telecom increased its shareholder stake in Amcom to 18.6 per cent in an attempt to block the merger. TPG eventually built its stake to 19.9 per cent of Amcom. In response, a campaign to persuade at least 75 per cent of shareholders to vote in favour of the merger was launched by both Amcom and Vocus. On 15 June 2015 the merger went ahead after 77 percent of Amcom shareholders voted in favour of the merger. In July 2015 the $1.2 billion merger between Amcom and Vocus was formally completed. On 29 June 2015 CEO Clive Stein resigned after a 16-year career with the company to make way for incoming Vocus CEO Spenceley to take over the combined group.

Executive director and founder Spenceley and non-executive director Tony Grist left the board of Vocus in October 2016 after a failed leadership succession proposal.

In February 2018 CEO Geoff Horth left the company. In March 2018 M2 Group Founding MD and CEO Vaughan Bowen stepped away from the role of Non-Executive Chairman of the Vocus Board to increase Board independence, and former Telstra Chairman and founding CEO of Optus, Robert Mansfield AO was made chairman. Michael Simmons became Interim CEO until the appointment of Kevin Russell on 28 May 2018.

In April 2018, Vocus announced it had decided not to sell off the New Zealand portion of the business as an acceptable offer had not been received.

On 25 June 2021, Vocus was acquired by Voyage Australia Pty Limited, a consortium of Macquarie Infrastructure and Real Assets (MIRA) and superannuation fund Aware Super.

On 14 October 2024, Vocus announces deal to purchase TPG Telecom’s fibre network assets for A$5.25 billion and emerges as one of Australia’s biggest owners of underground fibre. This deal was completed in August 2025.

On 14 July 2025, Andrés Irlando was appointed Chief Executive Officer of Vocus Group. He previously held senior leadership roles in the US telecommunications sector, including President and COO of Zayo Group and CEO of Verizon Connect.

=== Vocus acquisitions ===
Vocus has made several acquisitions to extend its product and service offering. In 2014, Vocus purchased a data centre from ASG Group for $11.7 million. In 2014 it also acquired Bentley data centre in Perth from IT provider ASG for $11.7m. The same year, it acquired FX Networks, a New Zealand-based fibre provider which services many of New Zealand's major organisations including many government agencies, telco carriers, ISPs and enterprises. In 2015, it acquired Enterprise Data Corporation, including two Sydney and Melbourne based data centres for $23.5 million. In 2015, Vocus acquired a 10% stake in the SEA-ME-WE 3 Cable from Telecom NZ, increasing the company's investment in Western Australia.

- Vocus Communications
  - 2016-12-01 Switch Utilities, NZ$6 million up front, and a provisionally deferred amount of NZ$5.18 million
  - 2016-10-26 Nextgen Networks, North-West Cable System and ASC, A$830 million
  - 2016-02-22 M2 Group, A$2.26 billion
  - 2015-08-07 Amcom, A$687 million
  - 2015-04-01 Enterprise Data Corporation A$23.5 million
  - 2014-08-13 Bentley Data Centre A$11.7 million
  - 2014-07-13 FX Networks, A$109 million
  - 2014-05-07 iBOSS International and One Telecom, A$147,348
  - 2013-01-18 Ipera Communications, A$1.08 million
  - 2012-06-19 Maxnet and DataLock, A$6.14 million
  - 2011-05-06 Digital River Networks, A$3.95 million
  - 2011-05-02 Perth International Exchange, A$7.2 million
  - 2010-11-12, E3 Networks (Sydney and Melbourne), A$5.92 million

=== Amcom acquisitions ===
Amcom
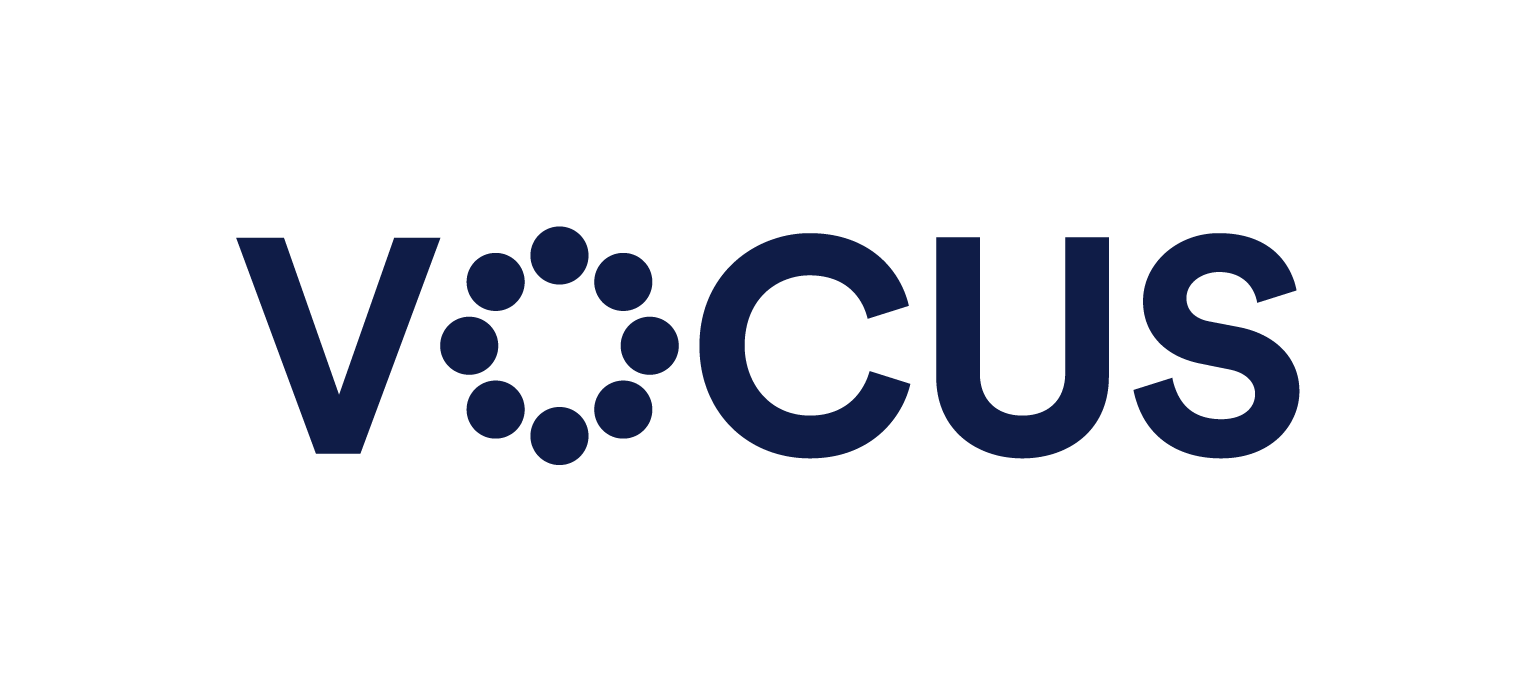
- Traded as: ASX: AMM (until 9 July 2015)
- ISIN: AU000000AMM3
- Founded: 1988; 38 years ago in Perth
- Headquarters: Australia
- Parent: Vocus Communications

In September 2005, Amcom acquired the customers of Perth Internet service provider Arachnet for A$1.6 million, adding 5,200 broadband and 2,100 dial-up customers to their user base, increasing Amcom's total broadband numbers to 7,500. In April 2007 Amcom Telecommunications completed the A$6.25 million acquisition of People Telecom's Perth-based corporate services business. The acquired assets include a client base using fibre and DSL-based broadband services and a large data centre facility with some 600 square metres of space. In February 2010, Amcom announced that it intended to acquire 100% of the issued share capital of IP Systems Pty Ltd, an IP communications company delivering voice, video and data solutions to Australia and New Zealand. The $5.3 million acquisition was completed in May 2010. Amcom bought out L7 Solutions Pty Ltd in 2012 for A$15 million. This allowed Amcom to expand its footprint in IT integration, managed services and consulting and additional of about 200 clients. Amcom acquired aCure Technology on 22 August 2013 for $14.3 million

  - 2014-11-21 Megaport, A$6.54 million
  - 2013-09-26 aCure Technology, A$13.2 million
  - 2013-07-25 Global Networks AMC Data Centre, A$22.4 million
  - 2011-11-22 L7 Solutions, A$15 million
  - 2010-05-24 IP Systems, A$21.8 million
  - 2007-04-03 People Telecom, A$6.62 million
  - 2005-09-16 Arachnet, A$1.68 million
  - 2005-09-16 Swiftweb/Boldweb, A$177,000
  - 2005-09-16 ADSL Perth Broadband Internet, A$15,000
  - 2003-10-01 Amnet Internet Services, Amnet IT Services, Amnet IX and Ezsoftwrite A$2.14 million

== Brands ==
=== Wholesale and international ===
- Vocus
- AAPT
- Vision Network

=== Business, enterprise and government - Australia ===
- Commander
- Vocus
- AAPT

=== Consumer - Australia ===
- Dodo
- iPrimus
