= Henry Austin Wilshire =

Australian architect (1860–1923)

- Born: 8 September 1860; Potts Point (Sydney), Australia
- Died: 6 August 1923 (aged 62); Sydney, Australia
- Citizenship: Australian
- Occupation: Architect
- Children: Daughter, Lena

Henry Austin Wilshire (HA Wilshire) was an architect and prominent member of Sydney society in the late 19th and early 20th centuries. He was an active and innovative architect, and a contributor to the community through interests in town planning and transport issues.

== Early and personal life ==
Wilshire was born in Potts Point (Sydney) on 8 September 1860, into one of Sydney's oldest and best-connected families. He was the youngest child of James Robert Wilshire MLC, Sydney's second elected mayor, who had died the week before Henry was born. His mother, Sarah Wilshire, lived until 1912, a well-regarded, active member of the community. The family moved to Burwood around 1880. In 1888 Wilshire married Hephzibah Maude Stewart, and they had one daughter, Lena, born in 1889. They moved to the Mosman/Cremorne area in 1893, and remained there for 30 years until Henry's death on 6 August 1923. During this period they lived in at least seven different residences, at least three of which were designed by Wilshire.

== Career ==
Wilshire began his architectural career in around 1879, articled to the well-known Mansfield Brothers. As an architect he was very active and versatile, designing many residences and other buildings. For most of his 44-year career he was a sole practitioner. However, for a brief period in 1888-1889 he partnered with George Taylor Shaw and, from 1913 until his death in 1923, was in partnership with Harry Cooper Day, trading as HA Wilshire and Day. Numerous of his works still exist today, including at least 13 that are listed on the NSW Heritage Register (see below). His buildings include Grafton Gaol in 1891, the heritage-listed Bennett and Wood (Speedwell bicycles) building in Sydney in 1908 (replacing their previous premises in Market Street, which he also designed, in 1900), and Warringah Hall (see e.g. Ajax Films), Neutral Bay in 1910.

Wilshire was an active member of the profession, being a member of the (then) Institute of Architects of New South Wales from at least the late 1880s. He was a member of the committee of the institute on various occasions from 1893 through to 1919, and held a number of executive positions including vice-president (1897–1899) and honorary treasurer (1901).

=== Grafton gaol ===
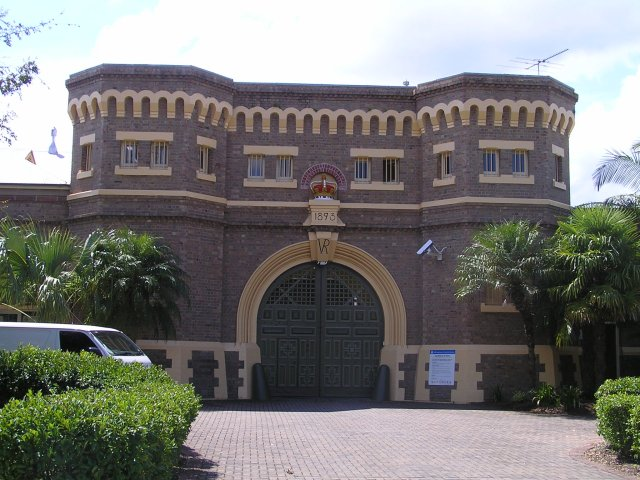
Grafton Gaol

The Grafton community had been agitating for many years during the 1880s for a new gaol to be constructed and, following the first competition for the design of a NSW public building, Wilshire was awarded first prize of 100 guineas, and was given the task of instigating its construction. The building is now heritage listed. (It was reported that he also won fourth prize in the same competition, and had earlier won second prize for a design for the Brisbane premises of the Royal Bank of Queensland and third prize for the Thomas Walker Hospital in Concord, New South Wales.

=== Sydney's lower North Shore ===
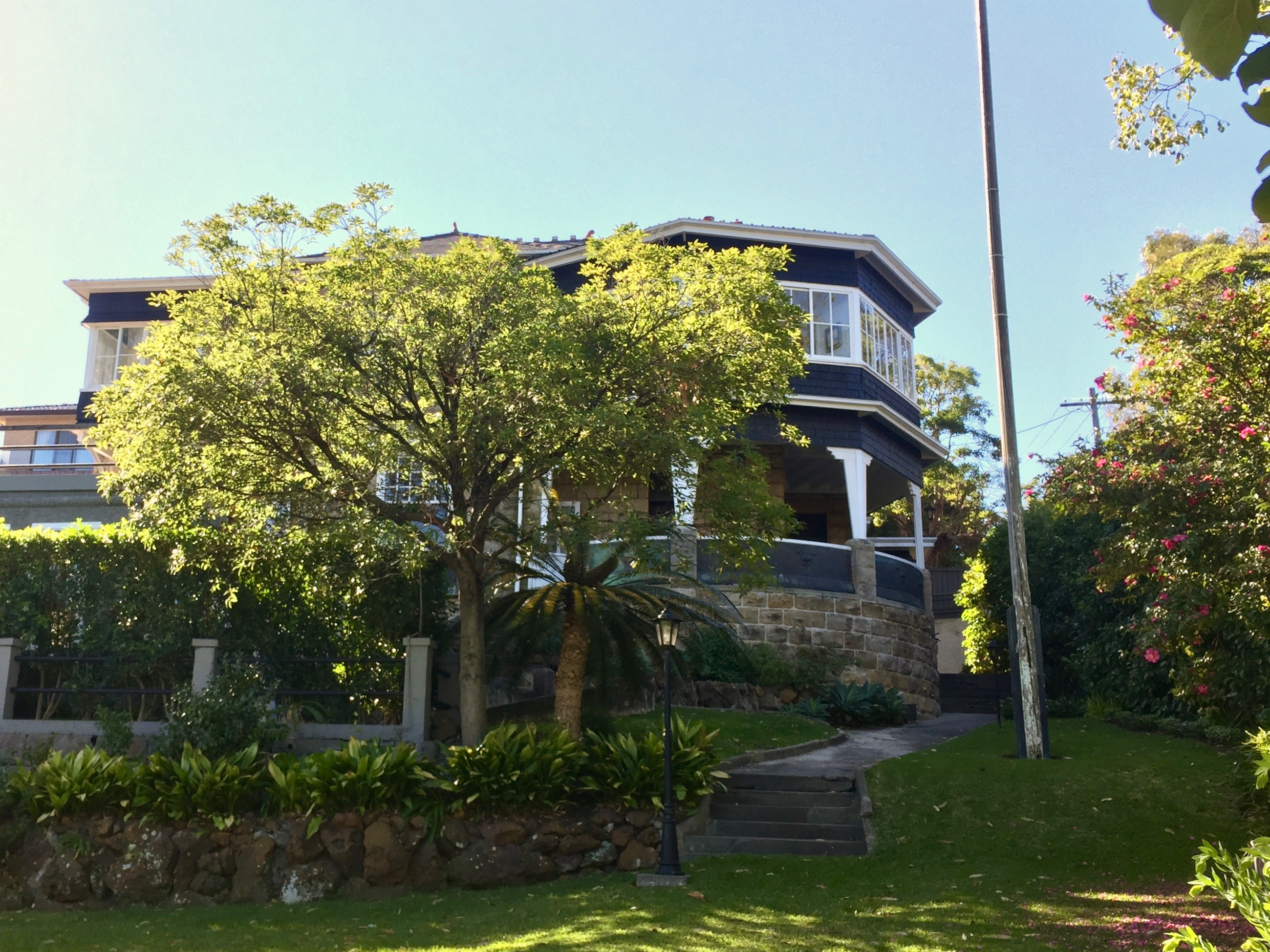
"Dalkeith" Cremorne, New South Wales

In the early 1890s, the Mosman/Cremorne/Neutral Bay area was a hive of residential development activity, supported by the introduction of the steam ferry service from Circular Quay. Wilshire moved to the area at this time presumably with the intention of involving himself in (and profiting from) this development. James Thompson Wilshire and John Matcham Wilshire (Henry's half-brother and cousin, respectively) also moved from Burwood to Neutral Bay/Cremorne around the same time – and presumably with similar intentions – and lived close to each other and to Henry for the rest of their lives. James, particularly, amassed a significant property portfolio prior to his death in 1909.

In 1904, Henry Wilshire and his wife undertook an overseas tour, including to the UK and the USA. On their return, he designed a number of flat-roofed houses, located in the Mosman/Neutral Bay area, two of which are listed on the NSW Heritage Register. At least eight such houses were built, of which five were erected prior to 1908, one in 1910, and the other two in 1912 and 1914.

Seven of the flat-roofed houses were built close to each other in Cremorne and Neutral Bay, and the eighth is in Mosman. Five of these houses are known to still exist, though one no longer has a flat roof. One, no longer in existence, in Bannerman Street Neutral Bay, was the home of the architecture/town planning/publishing couple, George Augustine Taylor and Florence Mary Taylor following their 1907 marriage.

In 1914, Wilshire travelled again to the US, this time to investigate the latest methods for the use of steel and concrete in construction.

A 2022 book by Davina Jackson recognises Wilshire as the first architect to build flat-roofed houses in Sydney.

=== Community works ===
Wilshire was very active in the community. In 1893 he wrote to Mosman Council, proposing to construct a horse-tramway from the ferry wharf up to Military Road, and in 1895 was among those opposing the proposal to mine coal at Cremorne Point.

He built one of the first houses at Palm Beach, New South Wales in 1913, which became his preferred residence until his health deteriorated around 1922. He was involved in the development of the Palm Beach area, including laying out and developing the golf course in the early 1920s. In this project he worked with Sydney merchant Charles Crossman, later president of Palm Beach Golf Club.

In 1903, Wilshire had designed a residence for Crossman, 'Ingleneuk' which, having been restored by Clive Lucas a century later, still stands in Neutral Bay, now the residence of the well-known Sydney couple Lisa Wilkinson and Peter FitzSimons.) He was also an active member of the Palm Beach Surf Life Saving Club, including serving as a vice-president and trustee.

In 1925, at the instigation of the Palm Beach Progress Association Warringah Shire Council named Wilshire Park in recognition of his contributions to the area. At some stage a typo emerged and the park is now designated 'Wiltshire' Park. Towards the end of WWI, 'Furlough House' was established at Narrabeen, a Sydney beachside suburb, to provide holidays for wives and children of servicemen. Wilshire designed the buildings (without fee), and served on the Board of Management.

=== Church properties ===
Wilshire undertook commissions for the Anglican Church, including designing the parsonage for the newly established St Clement's Anglican Church, Mosman, in 1894, the Church of St James at Ingleburn/Minto in 1897 (pro bono), St Albans in Lindfield in 1904 and, in 1918 the Anglican Memorial Church (now known as Christ Church) in Coonabarabran.

In 1916, he submitted the winning design in a competition organised by the Synod of the Sydney Archdiocese of the Church of England, for significant extensions and alterations to the Chapter House at St Andrew's Cathedral, Sydney, He also did commissions for other denominations: in 1886, he designed the Sunday School for the Ashfield Wesleyan (now Uniting) Church, now the headquarters for Bill Crews's Exodus Foundation. In 1901 he designed additions for the Congregational Church at Rockdale, and in 1921 designed the manse for the now heritage-listed St John's (Uniting) Church in Neutral Bay.

=== Other endeavours ===
Wilshire shared the Victorian era fascination with technology and invention. In 1894 he and E E Tournay-Hinde were granted a patent for a form of water crossing consisting of submerged iron tubes for pedestrian or vehicular traffic and, in the same year, they developed an innovative proposal to replace the old Pyrmont Bridge (Sydney) with a tunnel. In 1888 he, along with George Taylor Shaw, applied for a patent for a 'portable and floating swimming bath', and in 1911 he acquired the rights to a 'rotary excavator' invented by his cousin Henry Rawes Whittell. In 1906 he wrote to the SMH advocating the use of automatic telephones (as he had seen in the US) and, in 1921 wrote again, expressing the then 'modern' view that government money would be better used constructing a good regional road system rather than railways.

== Works by Henry Wilshire included in the NSW Heritage Register ==
Date	Item type	Details	Location	Heritage listing
1886	Sunday School	Ashfield Uniting Church Hall	180 Liverpool Rd Ashfield	1020538
1893	Jail	Grafton Correctional Centre	170 Hoof St Grafton	1640217
1897	Church	St James Anglican Church, Minto	2 Kent Street Minto	5066017 Interim listing, Oct 2017
1899-1904	Shops	Row of eight 2-storey shops and residences	581–595 Military Rd Mosman	2060281
1907	Commercial Building	Former Bennett and Wood building (now known as International House/Lincoln Building)	Pitt and Bathurst Sts Sydney	2424185
1903	House	Queen Anne style house	'Ingleneuk' 19 Bennett St Cremorne	2181041
1909	House	Stone house	'Dalkeith', 8 Bannerman St Cremorne	5045454 2181041
1910	House	Federation-style modifications to existing house (former residence of Ethel Turner)	'Woodlands' 1 Werona Ave Lindfield	5049940
1910	House	Flat-roofed house	15–17 Bertha Rd Cremorne	2181405
1914	House	Flat-roofed house	58 Murdoch St Cremorne	2181169
1916	Religious building	Chapter House, St Andrews Cathedral (extensions and alterations)	1400 George St Sydney	5054713
1919	Cottage	'Vernacular' weekender	'Windyridge' 50 Sunrise Rd Palm Beach	2270152
1923	Commercial Building	Former Edward Arnold building (Original building in 1903; extensive alterations in 1922–23)	113–115 Oxford St Sydney	2421047
