= Construction and Local Government Journal =

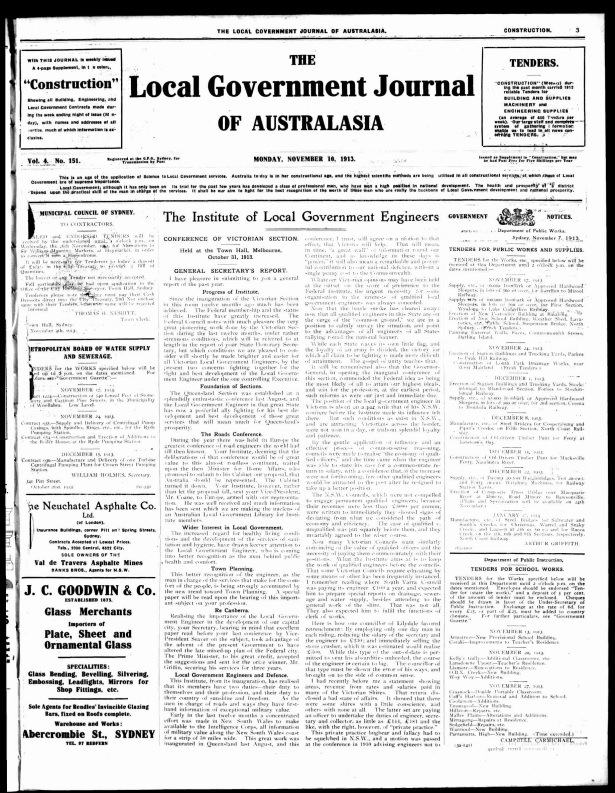
Local Government Journal of Australasia

The Construction and Local Government Journal was a weekly publication, edited by George Augustine Taylor and, after his death in 1928, by his widow Florence Mary Taylor, on the subject of the building, construction and local government. It was later published as the Construction and Real Estate Journal.

== History ==
The newspaper began life as the publication, Weekly Supplement to Building (18 Feb 1908 – 31 Aug. 1909); it then became Construction: weekly supplement to Building (7 Sept. 1909 – 3 Nov. 1913). It then became Construction and Local Government Journal (10 Nov. 1913 – 23 July 1930) and then Construction and Real Estate Journal (30 July 1930 – 11 May 1938) and then Construction (18 May 1938 – 16 May 1974).

== Digitisation ==
Some of the versions of the paper have been digitised as part of the Australian Newspapers Digitisation Program project hosted by the National Library of Australia.

== See also ==
- List of newspapers in New South Wales
- List of newspapers in Australia

== Bibliography ==
- Holden, W Sprague 1961, Australia goes to press, Melbourne University Press, Melbourne.
- Mayer, Henry 1964, The press in Australia, Lansdowne Press, Melbourne.
- Walker, R B 1976, The newspaper press in New South Wales 1803–1920, Sydney University Press, Sydney.
