= Belvedere (Cremorne) =

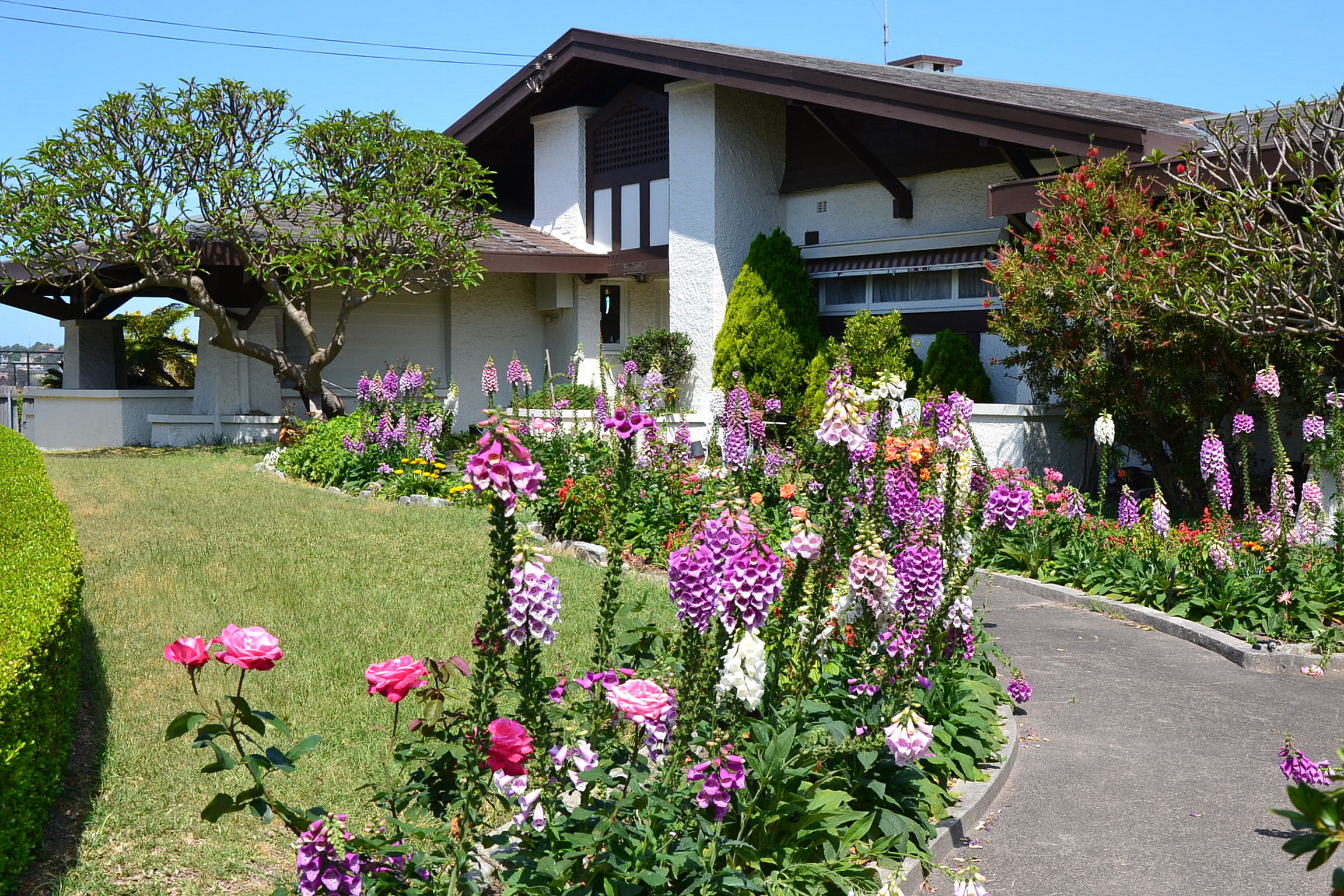
- Pictured in spring, 2012.

- Location within Sydney Location within Australia
- 33°49′54″S 151°13′42″E
- Location: 7 Cranbrook Avenue, Cremorne, North Sydney Council, New South Wales, Australia

History
- Built: 1919
- Built for: C. H. Stockman

Site notes
- Architect: Alexander Stewart Jolly
- Architectural style: Californian Bungalow

New South Wales Heritage Register
- Official name: Belvedere
- Type: State heritage (built)
- Designated: 2 April 1999
- Reference no.: 320
- Type: House
- Category: Residential buildings (private)

Belvedere is a heritage-listed residence at 7 Cranbrook Avenue, Cremorne, New South Wales, a suburb of Sydney, Australia. It was designed by Alexander Stewart Jolly. It was added to the New South Wales State Heritage Register on 2 April 1999.

== History ==
Built 1919 for grazier C. H. Stockman, who specified broad eaves and wide verandahs and generous proportions for the plan. The architect, Alexander Stewart Jolly, was a prominent and unorthodox architect influenced by a love and knowledge of timber, the Californian Bungalow movement and American "organic" architecture.

== Description ==
The house is an excellent example of the larger more mature Californian bungalow, and has all the typical elements of the larger more mature Californian bungalow style: planes of white rough-cast, areas of timber shingles, massive dark stained timber beams and low pitched, wide, sheltering eaves. There is a fine wide verandah with polished timber floor and stained timber beams to the roof. The front door is recessed between two heavy rough-cast piers which extend to, but do not support the gable overhand. The roof, which is an interesting interplay of planes, is formed of both hipped and gabled sections covered with slate. Jolly specialised in gadgets, and this house has a unique rotating cupboard between the kitchen and dining room. The whole house is in excellent condition. This building is designed in the Inter-War California Bungalow style.

Single storey residence of Interwar California bungalow style. A vigorous and assured interpretation of the Californian bungalow; with deep overhanging roofs, dynamic asymmetry and cleverly exposed structural timbers.

The California Bungalow was one of the most successful importations brought to Australian architecture and both Belvedere and Egglemont (11 Cranbrook Avenue) are impressive examples of this style of architecture. The bungalows are prominently located on the brow of a hill and have fine city views. Belvedere has wide verandahs to remind the client of his country home. The front door is recessed behind 2 heavy rough-cast piers which extend to the roof overhang. The roof, in turn, comprises hipped and gabled sections covered with slate. The bungalow incorporates planes of white rough-cast, areas of timber shingles, massive dark stained timber beams and low sheltering eaves. The front garden wall and gate continues the theme of rough-cast piers of the bungalow itself.

== Heritage listing ==
As at 8 November 2007, see also under "Cranbrook Avenue Group" NSHS#1052. The house is generally regarded as one of the finest individual California Bungalow designs in NSW, described by J. M. Freeland as "an eloquent sculptural statement" which "anticipated later domestic work by nearly half a century". The RAIA regards it as "the best work of a highly individual designer" (architect Alexander Stuart Jolly).

Belvedere was listed on the New South Wales State Heritage Register on 2 April 1999.

== See also ==
- Australian residential architectural styles
