= Building (Australian magazine) =

Building, full title Building: The Magazine for the Architect, Builder, Property Owner and Merchant, was a monthly magazine about architecture and building published by the Building Publishing Company in Sydney, New South Wales, Australia, from 1907 to 1942. It was subsequently published under the following titles: Building and Engineering, Building, Lighting and Engineering, Building, Products, Projects and Trends in Building, Building: Australia's National Building Journal.

Front page of Building, the magazine for the architect, builder, property owner and merchant, September 1907

== Publication history ==
Building: The Magazine for the Architect, Builder, Property Owner and Merchant was first published in September 1907 by the Building Publishing Company, established by George Augustine Taylor and his wife Florence Mary Taylor. The magazine "offered influential commentary on the built environment in Australia for the next half century". Florence Taylor wrote a regular column in the magazine which highlighted women in architecture.

From 1927 to October 1930, the magazine became the official organ of the Federated Master Builders' Association of Australia, and from November 1930 to 1942, the official organ of the Master Builders' Federation of Australia.

In September 1942 the title changed to Building and Engineering (1942-1952); the magazine then became known as Building, Lighting and Engineering (1952-1968). In 1968 the title changed to Building (1968-1970), and then to Products, Projects and Trends in Building (1971-1972). In 1972 the title reverted to Building, also known as Building: Australia's National Building Journal (September 1972 - November 1972). In November 1972 the magazine was absorbed by Construction.

== Digitisation ==
Issues from Vol. 1, no. 1 (September 1907) to Vol. 36, No. 216 (12 August 1925) of the magazine have been digitised by the National Library of Australia.
