= Dalkeith Property =

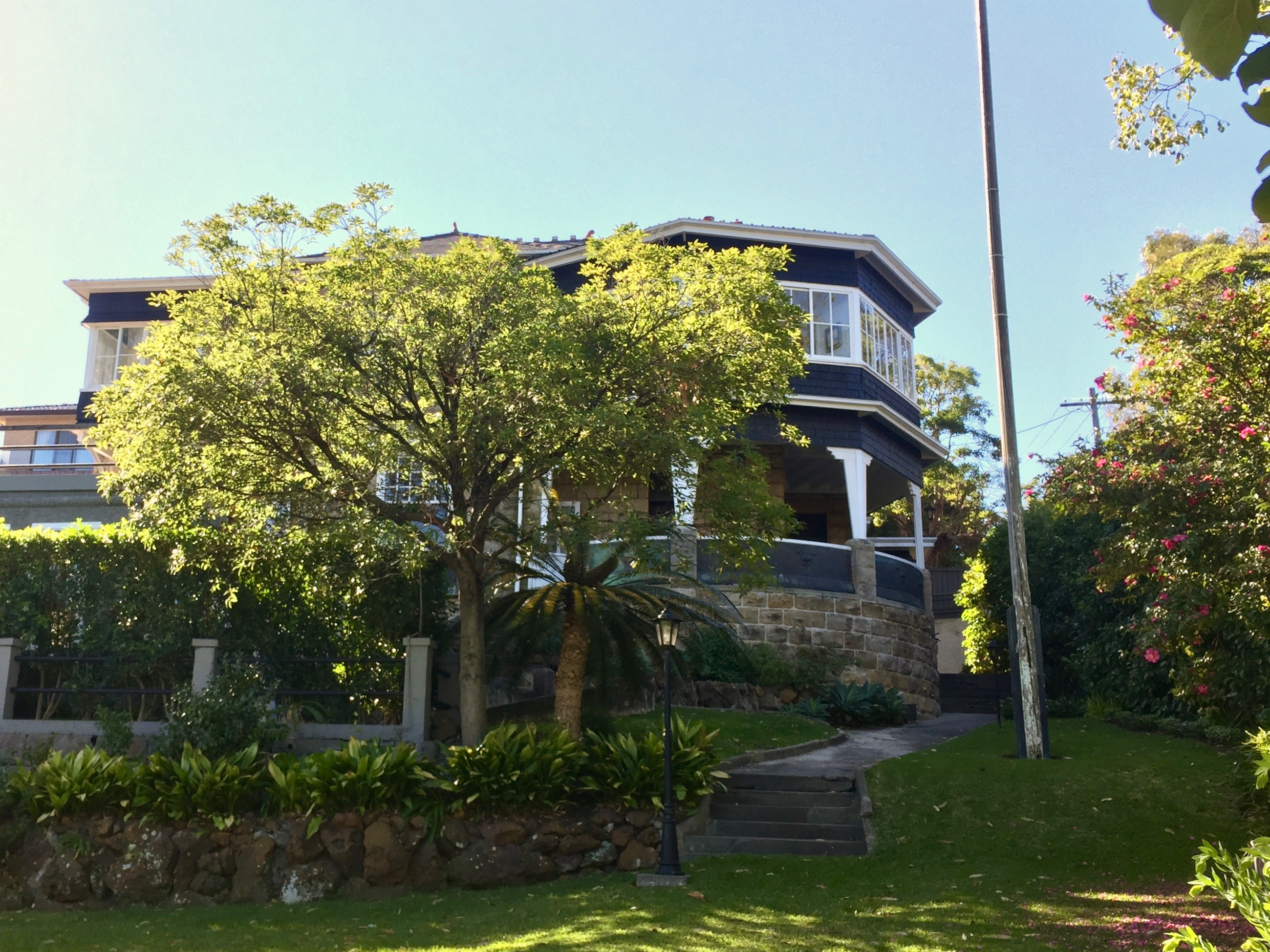
- Dalkeith, Cremorne, New South Wales

- Location within Sydney Location within Australia
- 33°50′13″S 151°13′27″E
- Location: 8 Bannerman Street, Cremorne, New South Wales, Australia

History
- Built: 1911–1914

Site notes
- Architects: Henry Austin Wilshire (main house); Stone & Siddeley (1914 pool room at front); O'Keefe (2016 & 2018 restoration & renovation)
- Architectural style: Federation Arts and Crafts

New South Wales Heritage Register
- Official name: Dalkeith Property
- Type: State heritage (built)
- Designated: 2 April 1999
- Reference no.: 310
- Type: House
- Category: Residential buildings (private)
- Builders: G. E. Flower

The Dalkeith Property or simply Dalkeith, is a heritage-listed residence at 8 Bannerman Street, Cremorne, New South Wales, Australia. It was designed by Henry Austin Wilshire (main house) and Stone & Siddeley (1914 pool room at front), and built between 1908 and 1910. At various points during its history, Dalkeith has been used as a meditation centre, residence and Norwegian Seamen's Church.

== History ==
Dalkeith was built c. 1908 for Frank Whiddon to a design by Henry Austin Wilshire.

Whiddon (1877-1947) was Chairman and Managing Director of Whiddon Brothers, a wool-scouring business established in 1900 in Botany and acquiring Messrs Johnson's and Vicars' works on the Botany Water Reserve in 1906. The company was formed by him and his brothers Horace and Arthur in 1900 and became a public company in 1910 with authorised capital of A£50,000 in £1,000 shares. Frank was active in the masonic movement and a keen yachtsman. He married Alice Maude Curnow in 1906 at the Pitt Street Uniting Church and it appears Dalkeith was commissioned shortly after c. 1908. The Whiddons had three children while living here: Helen M. (b.1909), Enid A. (b.1912) and Frank B. (b.1914). Alice died in 1919, and Frank married Blodwen Jones in September 1923. It appears they had moved to Point Piper in the interim. The schedules to primary application 54221 indicate conveyances in the property in May 1921 and April 1923.

Whiddon was a prominent and dedicated Freemason and later (1945) Grand Master of the NSW Masonic Society (North Sydney Historical Society & NSCC 1985 plaque on site). He was a founding member of Royal Prince Edward Yacht Club, a member of the Australian Jockey Club and enjoyed motoring and golf and is commemorated in the Frank Whiddon Masonic Homes. Frank Whiddon died in 1947 at his home in Point Piper and was cremated with Masonic rites. He was survived by his widow Blodwen, their daughter and son, and two daughters from his first marriage. His younger brother Horace, (from 1934 an MLC although an inactive one), became chairman of directors of the family firm.

The house was used from 1954 until 1978 as the Norwegian Seaman's Church ('Sjomannskirken'), with the former billiard room used as the chapel, then used as centre for the International Meditation Society.

== Description ==
=== House (c. 1908-12) ===
The house is constructed of local sandstone, with a pitched slate roof with terracotta finials and ridge saddles, a typical treatment at the time. It is a two storey house of rusticated ashlar sandstone with extensive use of timber shingle cladding to the upper storey. The multi-hipped roof is clad in slate with terracotta ridge capping. Features include the sheet metal verandah balustrade with decorative relief castings, rendered flat rain hoods over window and door openings and roughcast rendered entrance porch. This building is designed in the Federation Arts and Crafts style.

An interesting example of a Federation Arts and Crafts style house which is representative of the type of residences which typified the early development in the area. Associational value for its use a chapel for the Norwegian Seaman's church. Excellent survival of context. It remains a significant local landmark.

The billiard room was designed in 1914 by Stone & Siddeley and built in 1916. Rough cast plaster over masonry, flat roofed (with iron pipe balustrading). The original inglenook fireplace and stained glass windows were reinstated in 2018.

The original house was extended to the rear in 1923 (DA North Sydney council) to create a side, rear entrance and large reception rooms on the main level. Wood panelling and parquetry floors were added at this time.

=== Outbuildings ===
A double garage is on one side of the house accessed off Bannerman Street.

The original workshop (1908) was reconfigured as a cottage (two rooms: living/dining and bedroom, with open plan kitchen in living/dining area and bathroom/WC in bedroom area) by the Sjomannskirken and is documented by a c. 1969 DA drawing. The 1914 blueprint for the billiard room shows a "chimney to rise thro [sic] workshop", with "rough cast above workshop roof". The cottage roof was shallowly pitched and slate, with terracotta ridge tiles to hip and skillion roof. Walls were sandstone to front (downhill), and lightweight framing clad in "fibro" cladding to the extension the rear (uphill). tongue-and-groove lining boards to the ceiling in the living/dining space. The bedroom had internal wall / ceiling linings of vertical boards (walls), hardboard and boarding. The building was reconfigured in 2018 for use as a pool house (Nth Sydney council DA 468/16). The external sandstone structure of the original building was maintained.

=== Garden ===
The house is set well back from the street, on a sloping site terraced with rock walling, and accessed by concrete paths and steps. A spacious lawn occupies the lowest terrace level adjoining the street edge. A low stone wall with iron gate (and historic plaque on one pillar), and hedge of Viburnum odoratissimum marks the front boundary. Another similar murraya hedge lines the upper terrace on which the house sits.

The garden was replanted with heritage plants and natives between 2015 and 2018 after years of neglect. All Cocos Island or Queen palms (Syragus romanzoffianum) and the silver date (Phoenix sylvestris) were removed in 2015. A handful of pre-existing plants survived including a prominent Sydney blue gum on the lower level, a mature cycad on the mid level and several camellias (japonica and sasanqua). Shrubs now include sweet pittosporum (P.undulatum) and angels trumpet (Brugmansia) in the front garden bordering the upper (house) terrace.

A white-painted flag pole runs an Australian flag in the front yard.

=== Modifications and dates ===
2011: unapproved works undertaken: demolition of rear portion of the house; rendering of small outbuilding to rear; installing new roofing on this building.

2016 modifications to rear of property as approved in DA 468/16 were completed. Architect: Paul O'Keefe. Builder: Shaw Constructions

2018 modifications to outbuildings, billiard room, pool construction and landscape works as approved in DA 468/16 were completed. Architect: Paul O'Keefe. Builder: Shaw Constructions

== Heritage listing ==
As at 27 July 2011, interesting example of Federation Arts and Crafts style house which is representative of the type of residences which typified the early development in the area. Association value for its use as a chapel for the Norwegian Seaman's Church. Excellent survival of garden and context, and it remains a significant local landmark.

Dalkeith Property was listed on the New South Wales State Heritage Register on 2 April 1999 having satisfied the following criteria.

The place is important in demonstrating the course, or pattern, of cultural or natural history in New South Wales.

Interesting example of a Federation Arts and Crafts style house which is representative of the type of residences which typified the early development in the area. Excellent survival of garden and context and it remains a significant local landmark.

The place has a strong or special association with a person, or group of persons, of importance of cultural or natural history of New South Wales's history.

Associational value for its use a chapel for the Norwegian Seaman's church. Associations with Frank Whiddon, industrialist, mason and philanthropist; H.A. Wilshire, architect, G.E.Flower, master builder, Stone & Siddeley architects and the International Meditation Society.

The place is important in demonstrating aesthetic characteristics and/or a high degree of creative or technical achievement in New South Wales.

Interesting example of a Federation Arts and Crafts style house which is representative of the type of residences which typified the early development in the area. Excellent survival of garden and context and it remains a significant local landmark.

The place possesses uncommon, rare or endangered aspects of the cultural or natural history of New South Wales.

Socially rare regionally.

The place is important in demonstrating the principal characteristics of a class of cultural or natural places/environments in New South Wales.

Interesting example of a Federation Arts and Crafts style house which is representative of the type of residences which typified the early development in the area. Excellent survival of garden and context and it remains a significant local landmark. This item is assessed as historically representative regionally. This item is assessed as aesthetically representative regionally. This item is assessed as socially representative locally.

== See also ==
- Australian residential architectural styles
