= Florence Mary Taylor =

Australian architect, publisher (1879–1969)

Florence Mary Taylor OBE CBE
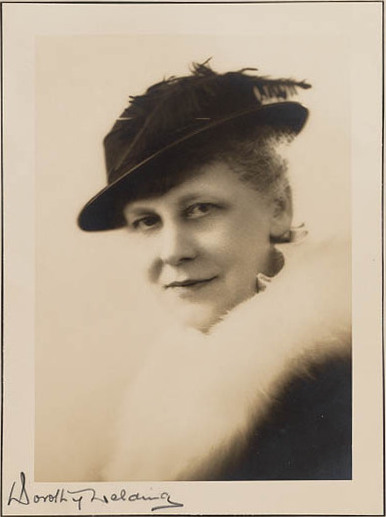
- Born: 29 December 1879; Bedminster, Somerset, England
- Died: 13 February 1969 (aged 89); Potts Point, New South Wales, Australia
- Occupations: Architect; publisher
- Practice: Town Planning Association of New South Wales; Building Publishing Co. Ltd

Florence Mary Taylor CBE (née Parsons; 29 December 1879 – 13 February 1969) was the first qualified female architect in Australia. She was also the first woman in Australia to fly in a heavier-than-air craft in 1909 and the first female member of the UK's Institution of Structural Engineers in 1926. However, she is best known for her role as publisher, editor and writer for the influential building industry trade journals established in 1907 with her husband George, which she ran and expanded after his death in 1928 until her retirement in 1961.

== Early life ==
Taylor was born at Bedminster, in Somerset (now a part of Bristol), England to John Parsons and Eliza (née Brooks), working-class parents who described themselves as "stone quarryman" and "washerwoman" in the British census of 1881. Her family migrated to Australia when she was a child, arriving in Sydney in 1884 after a short stint in Queensland. Her father soon found work as a draftsman-clerk with the Parramatta Council, and also in the sewerage construction branch of the NSW Department of Public Works. According to her official although unpublished biography by Kerwin Maegraith, Taylor attended a nearby public school where she says she received a "good education".

== Career ==
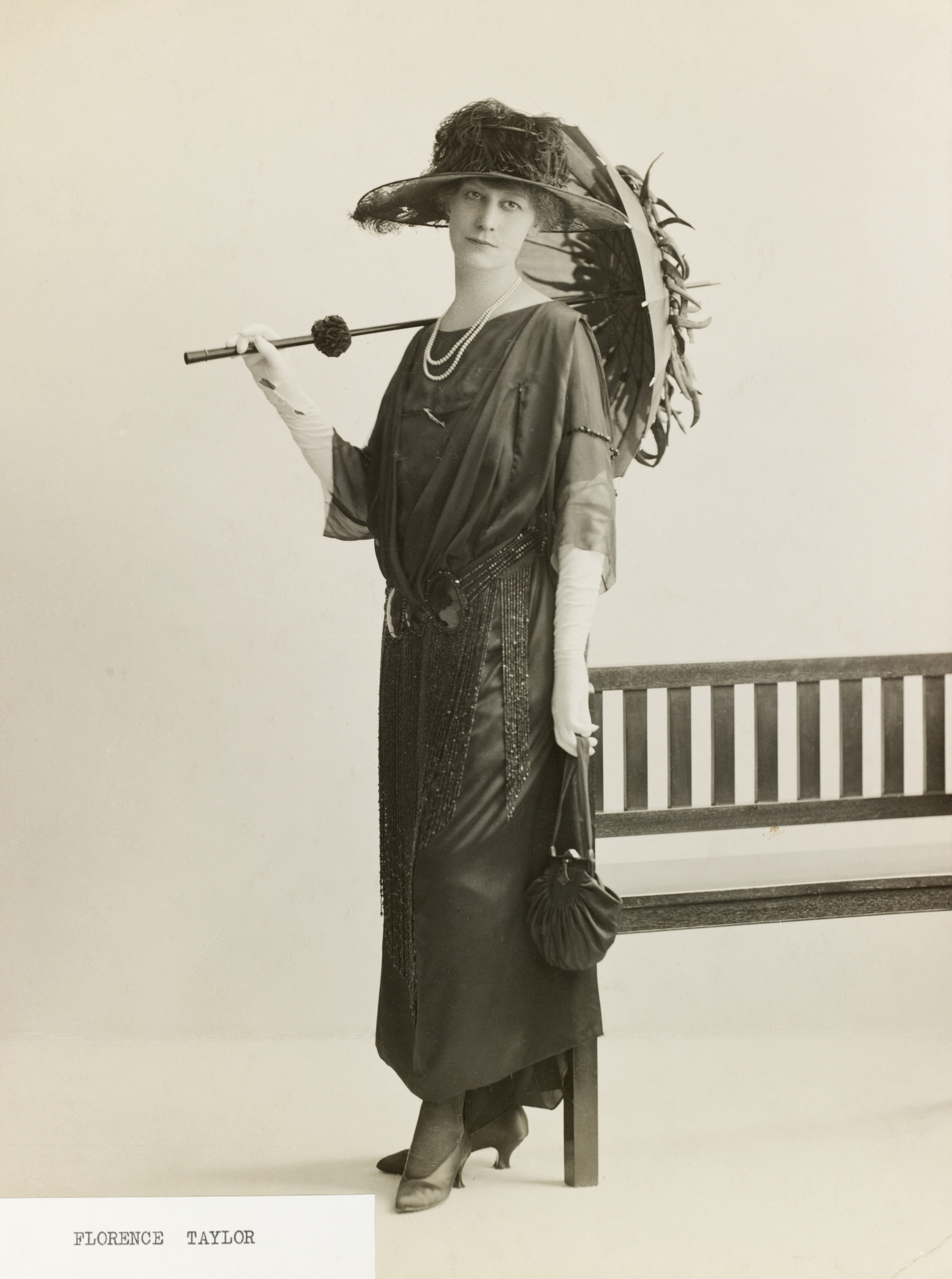
Portrait of Florence M. Taylor, ca. 1926.

Following the deaths of her mother in 1896 and father in 1899, Taylor was forced to find work to help support herself and her two younger sisters. She eventually found a position as a clerk in the Parramatta architectural practice of Francis Ernest Stowe, an acquaintance of her father's. Inspired by the example of draftspeople in the same office who were earning far more than herself, she enrolled in night classes at the Sydney Technical College where she became the first woman to complete final year studies in architecture in 1904.

During her architecture course Taylor was articled to the architect Edward Skelton Garton. Although she had fond memories of being mentored by Garton, she later recalled that other workers in the office were less encouraging. Soon after completing her articles, she went on to work in the busy and prestigious office of John Burcham Clamp, where she claimed she was made chief draftsperson. Clamp was her champion for an unsuccessful application to become the first woman member of the NSW Institute of Architects.

With Clamp's strong support in 1907, Taylor applied to become the first female member of the Institute of Architects of New South Wales. However she was not accepted at this time, and she later claimed to have been "blackballed" by a groundswell of hostility from the all-male membership who did not wish to admit a woman member. After the Institute had a reorganisation and dropped their entrance exam, she eventually became their first woman to be associate member having "practised as an architect and at present is serving in an advisory capacity to architects as well as assisting in the production of "The Building Magazine"". She was admitted as a full member in 1923.

In April 1907, Taylor married Sydney-born artist, inventor, and craftworker George Augustine Taylor at St Stephen's Presbyterian Church in Sydney. George Taylor had lectured her at college and was a close friend of her first employer Francis Ernest Stowe. On 5 December 1909, Taylor became the first Australian woman to fly a heavier-than-air craft, in a glider built by her husband in his Redfern workshop, from the Narrabeen sandhills near Sydney. They were both passionate about architecture and town planning, amongst many other interests and activities. Max Freeland described them as "possibly the most amazing couple in Australia's history".

Within a few months of their wedding George and Florence Taylor had established a publishing company, Building Publishing Co. Ltd that specialised in building industry journals, spearheaded by Building magazine, three journals of which Florence edited: Harmony, Young Australia and the Australian (later Commonwealth) Home. According to garden historian Richard Aitken, 'Gardening, although not expressly covered by Building, was treated nonetheless as an integral part of design, both at a domestic level and on a broader public scale'. Taylor's personal assistant was Mary Emily Haworth (1901–1998). Journalist John Canner (1882–1978) also worked on "Building Ltd" where he met and later married Mary Haworth.

For some years following their marriage the Taylors lived in Bannerman Street, Cremorne, in a house designed by the innovative architect, Henry Austin Wilshire, before moving to an apartment on Loftus Street, Sydney, where their publishing business was also located. In 1913 they were founding members of the Town Planning Association of New South Wales, and Florence served as its secretary for many years.

Following her husband's sudden death, drowning in his bath associated with an epileptic seizure in 1928, Taylor maintained their publishing business and while forced to close eight of their eleven journals, she maintained Building (later Building, Lighting and Engineering) (1907–72), Construction (1908–74) and the Australasian Engineer (1915–73), editing them herself and expanding significantly after World War II. She continued to produce town plans and also travelled to Asia, the Americas and Europe bringing back ideas on town planning which informed her writings and speeches. She published a book about her town plans in 1959, authored by her employee J.M. Giles, Fifty years of town planning with Florence M. Taylor.

== Retirement and death ==
Taylor retired in 1961 at 81 years of age, and lived in Potts Point. She died there on 13 February 1969 and was cremated with Anglican rites. Her estate was valued for probate at $226,281.

== Legacy ==
In some of the many interviews where she told her life story, Taylor suggested that she had designed up to 100 houses in Sydney during her stint as an architect between 1900 and 1907. Although she left no easy records specifying where these were located, some aspects of her design work have now been documented. In 1907 she worked with her employer John Burcham Clamp on the basement of the Farmers Department store in Pitt Street Sydney, perhaps the first example of a woman contributing to commercial architectural design in Sydney. Also in 1907 she provided a perspective drawing for the winning competition entry for the Commercial Traveller's Building in Sydney (which was demolished to make way for the MLC Centre in the 1970s). Again in 1907 she won prizes in several architectural design sections of the "First Australian Exhibition of Women's Work" in Melbourne in 1907. Her winning design for a kitchen was published in the NSW Institute of Architects' journal in November 1907. Her second-prize winning design for a seaside cottage had to wait another 50 years before being published in one of her own journals, Construction, on 24 December 1958. Further research has uncovered houses probably designed by Taylor at 12 Florence Street, Cremorne, Hogue House on Kareela Road, Cremorne, and a house built in the 1920s for her sister Annis on Thomas Street, Roseville.

Taylor's legacy as a town planner is more extensive. Throughout her career she produced town planning schemes which were published in her journals and Fifty Years of town planning with Florence Taylor (c. 1959). Many of the ideas she advocated for Sydney have come to fruition in recent decades including a harbour tunnel crossing, an eastern suburbs distributor freeway, the construction of "double-decker streets" such as the Victoria Street overpass across William Street at Kings Cross, increased building of apartments especially in harbourside localities such as Woolloomooloo and North Sydney, more flexible mixed-use zoning (including longer shopping hours), making Sydney more attractive for tourism and the need to conserve and plant trees. Other ideas have proved unpopular or incorrect, such as her desire to demolish Hyde Park Barracks or build heliports in the CBD and her contention that the Sydney Opera House would be a white elephant.

Taylor was also closely involved in the Arts Club, Royal Aero Club of New South Wales, Society of Women Writers, New South Wales branch of the Australian Forest League, Australian-American Association, Royal Empire Society, and the Bush Book Club.

The Canberra suburb Taylor was named in her honour, as were several professional awards, including the 'Florence M. Taylor Medallion' from the Master Builders Association of Victoria and the 'Florence Taylor Award' from the Queensland chapter of the Australian Institute of Building. Florence Taylor Street in the Canberra suburb of Greenway is also named for her.

In 1930, Taylor also established the George A. Taylor Memorial Medal with the Master Builders Federation of Australia. This medal is presented annually to the winner of the "Building Construction Prize for completion among Technical Schools throughout the Commonwealth".

The biography Florence Taylor's Hats: Designing, Building and Editing Sydney by Bronwyn Hanna and Robert Freestone was published in 2008 by Halstead Press ISBN 9781920831363.

Since 2006 a three-storey high portrait of Taylor adorns an apartment building facing the railway on the southern approach to Sydney's Central railway station, which commemorates her as "Australia's first woman architect". Although this portrait also features a photograph of the beautiful Gothic Mortuary Station, located nearby, that building was completed ten years before Taylor's birth, designed by the then Government Architect James Barnet, and there is no known link between Taylor and the building.

In early 2019, the Master Builders Association of NSW, in association with News Ltd, launched 'Florence', a new magazine "dedicated to women working in, and contributing to the construction industry. [It] highlights the many roles that women play in the industry, and shares their stories." Issue 1 states that Florence Taylor was the "inspiration behind" the magazine, and provides a brief biography of her.

A tunnel boring machine used in New South Wales is named after her.

A portrait of Taylor by Jerrold Nathan is held by the Mitchell Library, Sydney.

== Awards ==
Taylor was appointed an Officer of the Order of the British Empire in 1939 and elevated to a Commander of that order in 1961. Florence Mary Taylor was inducted into the Victorian Honour Roll of Women in 2001.

== See also ==
- Women in architecture
