= Grafton Gaol =

Heritage-listed building in New South Wales, Australia

Grafton Intake and Transient Centre
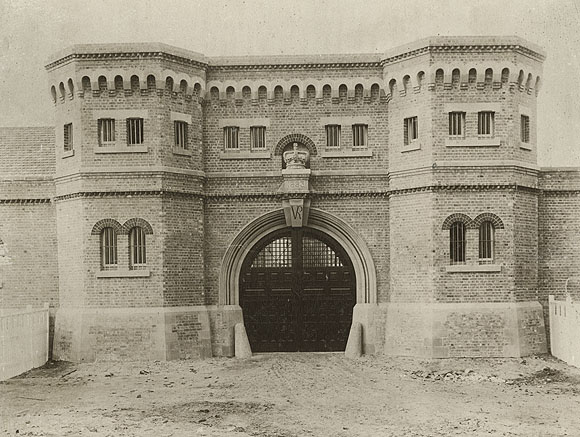
- The heritage-listed facade of the Centre
- Interactive map of Grafton Intake and Transient Centre
- Location: Grafton, New South Wales, Australia; 29°40′36″S 152°56′25″E
- Status: Operational
- Security class: Medium/minimum (males only)
- Capacity: 64
- Opened: 8 September 1893
- Former name: Grafton Gaol (1893–1991); Grafton Correctional Centre (1992–2012)
- Managed by: Corrective Services NSW
- Website: Grafton Intake and Transient Centre
- Building details
- Location in New South Wales

General information
- Architectural style: Federation

Technical details
- Material: Brick, with a sandstone trim and terracotta tiles

Design and construction
- Architect: Henry Austin Wilshire
- Main contractor: Holloway Bros

New South Wales Heritage Register
- Official name: Grafton Correctional Centre
- Designated: 2 April 1999
- Reference no.: 00809

The former Grafton Gaol, later called the Grafton Correctional Centre and then Grafton Intake and Transient Centre is a heritage-listed former medium security prison for males and females, located in Grafton, in the Northern Rivers region of New South Wales, Australia. The centre was operated by Corrective Services NSW an agency of the Department of Attorney General and Justice of the Government of New South Wales. In its last correctional use, the centre detained sentenced and remand prisoners under New South Wales and/or Commonwealth legislation. It was added to the New South Wales State Heritage Register on 2 April 1999.

== History ==
The current Grafton Gaol complex is the third gaol to be constructed to serve the town of Grafton. Correctional facilities were first established in Grafton in 1862 under the supervision of the Office of the Sheriff accommodating up to 48 inmates. A second complex was established but did not contain the required number of cells, was floodprone and unhygienic.

A permanent facility was not established until 1893. During the early 1890s, the design of public buildings was not automatically given to the Government Architect, but was open to competition. Sydney architect Henry Austin Wilshire won the Grafton Gaol competition with a design following trends already evident in the gaols designed by the Colonial Architect. The design consisted of a square compound, with brick walls, with an elaborate gatehouse, featuring a machicolated parapet, a sandstone archway and elaborate panelled doors. The gaol was built by the Holloway Bros. and proclaimed on 8 September 1893. Prisoners were transferred to the new facility in November of the same year.

By 1924, the gaol had been reclassified as a maximum security prison; reverted to medium security by about 1945. After 1942, increasing tensions in the state's prisons and a number of serious assaults on prison officers led to Grafton Gaol being used to house the most intractable prisoners.

Riots at Bathurst and problems at other correctional facilities during the 1970s resulted in the appointment of Justice John Nagle to conduct a Royal Commission to oversee reforms to the Australian penal system. As best described by Justice Nagle during proceedings of the Nagle Royal Commission (1976–1978):

It is the view of the Commission that every prison officer who served at Grafton during the time it was used as a gaol for intractables must have known of its brutal regime. The majority of them, if not all, would have taken part in the illegal assaults on prisoners. In some instances, the beatings began even before the security belt and handcuffs were removed. The beatings were usually administered by three or four officers wielding rubber batons. The prisoner was taken into a yard, ordered to strip, searched, and then the biff began. The word biff by no means describes the brutal beating which ensued. A former prison officer, Mr J.J. Pettit, described it: sometimes three, four or five of them would assault the prisoner with their batons to a condition of semi-consciousness. On occasions the prisoner urinates, and his nervous system ceases to function normally'. If most of the prisoners are to be believed, the officers had no compunction about beating them around their backs and heads; nor were they averse to kicking them when they were on the ground. They invariably abused them while they were hitting them, calling them 'bastards', 'cunts' and other abusive names. Sometimes they threatened to kill them.

— Nagle, J., Nagle Royal Commission, 1978.

Accepting the Nagle Report in 1978, the Wran Labor government began prison reform under the leadership of Dr Tony Vinson.

The Grafton Gaol was officially abolished by proclamation from 18 December 1991, and was converted to a Periodic Detention Centre in the same proclamation. The remaining prisoners were removed and the new centre received its first detainees on 8 May 1992. The gaol's name was changed to the Grafton Correctional Centre.

== Later developments ==
Inmates from the centre make padded, waterproof Street Swags, distributed by national charities to alleviate the hardship of homelessness.

In June 2010 an inmate was found bleeding to death in his cell. He died several days later in a Brisbane hospital. Serving time for traffic offences, a coronial inquest heard that threats were made against the prisoner's life by his cellmate whose sleep was disturbed by snoring. Prison officials were criticised when CCTV footage revealed that the inmate's calls for help were ignored by prison officers and the officers failed to render first aid.

In 2011 there was contention over the future of Grafton Correctional Centre, with some suggesting its closure or privatisation. The women's wing was shut in November 2011, with female inmates transferred to the Mid North Coast Correctional Centre. In June 2012 the O'Farrell government decided to downgrade the facility to house up to 64 inmates who are taken into custody or are currently in custody and need to attend court in the Northern Rivers region.

Grafton Gaol closed in August 2019 as planned after a considerable investment was made in the nearby Clarence Correctional Centre, which was officially opened on 25 July 2020.

== Historic features ==
Grafton Gaol Complex originally consisted of a square compound, with brick walls, with one elaborate gatehouse providing access for staff, visitors and prisoners alike. The gatehouse features a machicolated parapet, a sandstone archway and elaborate panelled doors. A Range building was constructed within the compound, adjacent to the gatehouse to provide facilities for the prison officers and visitors. A sterile zone separated the cell ranges from the prison walls. Male and female prisoners were completely segregated with separate cell ranges, exercise yards, bath houses and hospital facilities. The (former) male cell range is largely intact. Workshop and kitchen facilities were incorporated in a new range adjacent to the male cell block. The Prison Governor's residence (now Administration block) was located outside the compound wall, adjacent to the main gatehouse. This building features polychromatic brickwork, tuck pointing and some sandstone detailing. Brick, with a sandstone trim and terracotta tiles, all characteristic materials of the Federation period, were used throughout the complex, the level of detail depending on the function of the building. The complex has been extended to one side. New watch towers have been built however elements of the original towers remain intact.

== Heritage listing ==
The Grafton Gaol complex is significant as it demonstrates the development of the philosophy regarding prison architecture in NSW and the confinement of prisoners in the late nineteenth century. It is one of few gaol complexes designed by private architects in Australia. It is one of few known examples of the work of Henry Wiltshire. It continues the features of gaol design developed by the Colonial (later Government) Architects branch. It is one of the few public buildings designed by competition in the late nineteenth century; its design utilises characteristic materials of the Federation period. Its construction is related to the growth and expansion of Grafton.

Grafton Correctional Centre was listed on the New South Wales State Heritage Register on 2 April 1999.

== Notable prisoners ==
- Nathan Baggaley – a former Olympic canoe sprinter, jailed between 2009 and 2011 for dealing ecstasy
- Darcy Dugan – an Australian bank robber and New South Wales' most notorious prison escape artist. Dugan spent 44 years in various prisons in New South Wales including Grafton Correctional Centre.
- Len Lawson – a convicted rapist and murderer, died in Grafton Correctional Centre in 2003, serving life imprisonment.
- Kevin Simmonds – a thief and gaol escapee, found hanged in Grafton Gaol in 1966, serving life for manslaughter

== See also ==
- Punishment in Australia
