= Alexander Stewart Jolly =

Australian architect (1887 - 1957)

- Born: 18 July 1887; Wardell, New South Wales
- Died: 17 April 1957 (aged 69); Wollstonecraft, Sydney, New South Wales
- Occupation: Architect
- Spouse(s): Kathleen Wilhelmina, née Macky
- Parent(s): James Jolly and Jessie Spence, née Stewart
- Practice: Wardell & Denning
- Design: Californian Bungalow

Alexander Stewart Jolly (1887–1957) was a Sydney-based architect, published poet and children's author in the early 20th century. His buildings are primarily in Sydney's northern suburbs and the north coast of New South Wales. His architectural work was strongly influenced by Frank Lloyd Wright’s School in Chicago, as well as the Arts and Crafts movement of the time.

== Life ==
Jolly was born in 1887 in Wardell, near Ballina, New South Wales. His father was a furniture maker, a partner in a firm, Brown & Jolly, who specialised in cabinetry, furniture making and who occasionally designed houses and their furnishings. On a trip to Perthshire, Scotland in his late teens, Jolly encountered craggy stone inglenooks that would later be a strong feature in his buildings.

After finishing school, he returned to work at his family's firm for several years. In 1908 he moved to Sydney and began work for the firm Wardell and Denning, where he completed a two-year architectural apprenticeship, following which he moved back to Lismore in 1910. He began his own practice as an architect and went into partnership with F. J. Board in 1914. Their first project was St Bartholomew's Anglican Church in Alstonville, which was followed by more buildings in that area. After marrying Kathleen Dill-MacKay in 1918, he returned to Sydney. Jolly began working in Bond Street in the City. He built mostly houses from 1918 until 1923, most on the North Shore of Sydney and influenced by the Californian Bungalow style that became popular in Australia after the Federation period.

In the 1920s, Jolly temporarily retired from architecture because of poor health. He found new work selling blocks of land in developing Avalon, on Sydney's Northern Beaches. To further his knowledge of the plots, he lived in small cabins or tents on the land until they were sold. As a result, several new owners of the land commissioned Jolly to design houses. The Depression led to a decrease in building and land sales in Avalon. This, combined with financial problems, led to Jolly's alcoholism. At one point, to prove to his family he had ended his problems with alcohol, Jolly cut off part of a finger. He began writing poems and short stories, mostly for children, two books of which, Adrift at Sea and Spirit of the Bush, were published in 1932.

Alexander Jolly began working in real estate again in the 1930s on the New South Wales South Coast until the Second World War, but he never returned to architecture. He died in Wollstonecraft, Sydney in 1957.

== Residential architecture ==
Jolly had a particular interest in organic architecture. He was influenced heavily by Frank Lloyd Wright's work in America, especially the way Wright used the outside environment to play a role in the building. Jolly's work contrasted with the stark modernism of the time, by focussing on the appreciation of organic forms and materials. Jolly studied the landscape and the shapes inspired by nature, such as timber, stone, wrought iron and brick, and was opposed to the glass, concrete and steel that were popular at the time. Organic inspiration saw the beginning of the Arts and Crafts movement and the California Bungalow.

Jolly worked mainly within the bungalow form. His Belvedere in Cremorne, is an outstanding example of the California Bungalow style. It has heritage listing at both state and federal levels.

When designing Nebraska (Gordon, New South Wales, 1921), Jolly broke away from the traditional bungalow form of thick exterior pillars, and replaced these with rough stone piles supporting pillars made from large tree trunks and branches that became beams and supports. The house also featured irregular stonework. Nebraska has a state heritage listing.

Noonee in Balmoral, New South Wales, built in 1918-1919, explored the American hunting lodge, which was a requirement of the client. This hunting lodge used masonry and rustic timberwork, a type of materiality first seen in this house. Jolly also designed items for the interiors of his buildings. He began with built-in furniture, and also developed labour saving devices. In Belvedere he designed a rotating servery cupboard between the kitchen and dining room, while in Noonee he designed a dining table that slid on rails into the living space from the kitchen.

After moving to Avalon, Jolly designed Loggan Rock in 1929. Situated in the Avalon bush, Loggan Rock took its inspiration from a Bavarian hunting lodge. It was constructed from piles of stone and timber with a large stone chimney, structural posts that were crafted from large bush trunks and an oversized gabled roof and fireplace – all similar to Jolly's previously bungalow style. The windows are outlined with tree branches and the glass panes are set into forked tree branches, providing views to Avalon. Photographer Frank Hurley spent many weekends here using it as a retreat. Jolly also designed the interior, with built-in stone benches and a large tree trunk as a table. The house has a state heritage listing. It has been described as the Jolly Folly and arguably the most bizarre home in Sydney

Koreelah in Byron Bay is a large arts and crafts style home possible the last he designed prior to his works in Sydney.

Hy Brasil, also located in Avalon, was built in 1936, having been commissioned by Arthur Wilson, who called it The Gem. It was bought in 1958 by Ted Herman, son of the painter Sali Herman. He renamed it Hy Brasil after a mythical island said to have existed in the Atlantic Ocean, west of Ireland. It was influenced by the California Bungalow style and organic architecture movements. It is heritage-listed.

Careel House, located on Careel Head, overlooking Whale Beach, is built from rough stone blocks. It has a gabled end with roof shingle. The entrance is unadorned, without a porch or anything similar. The interior had a large living area, which could be subdivided with a folding screen of glazed doors to create smaller living spaces. Again, built-in furniture featured; during the day, beds lay concealed behind timber panels. The house was used as a lookout point during World War II and now has a state heritage listing.

== Gallery ==
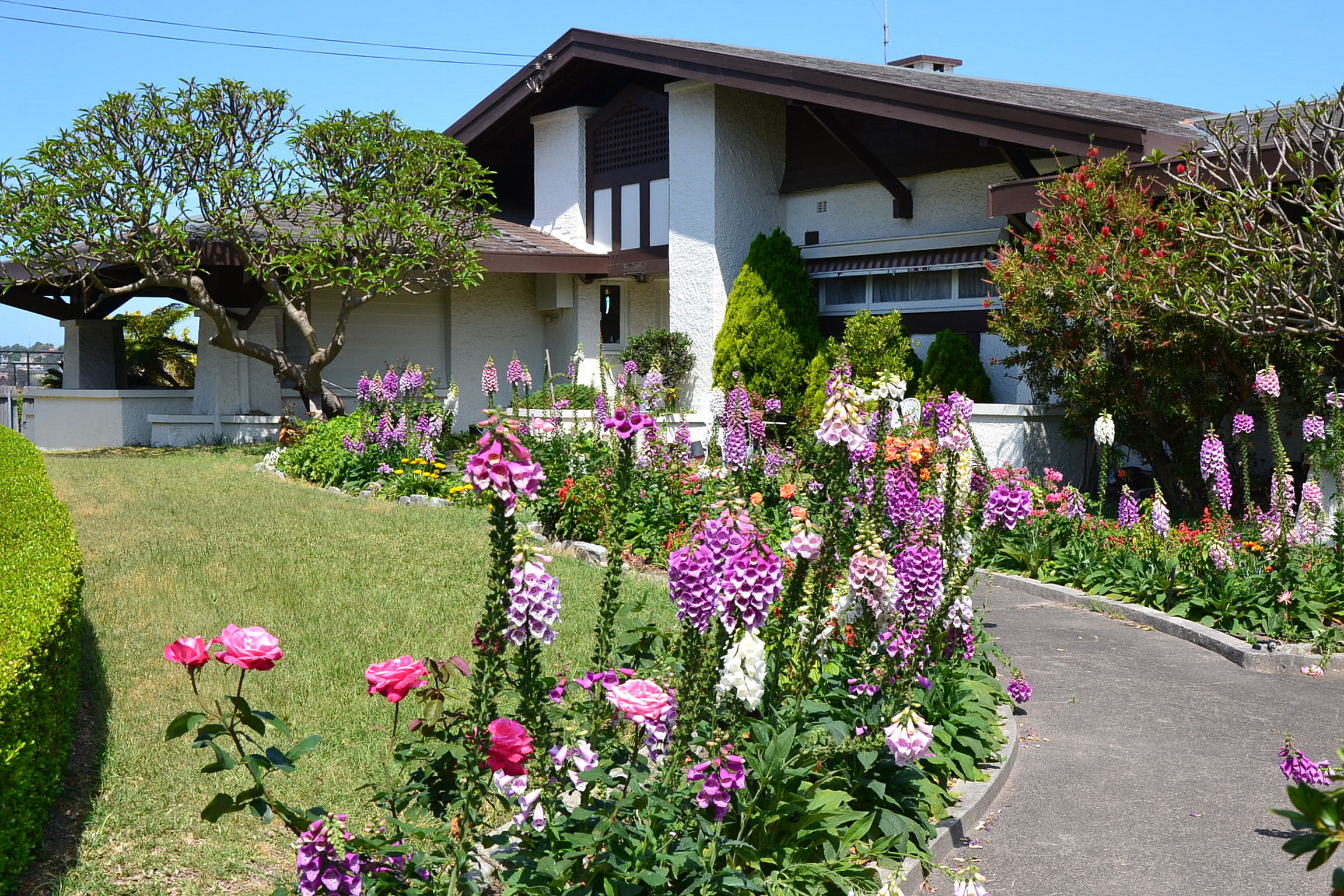
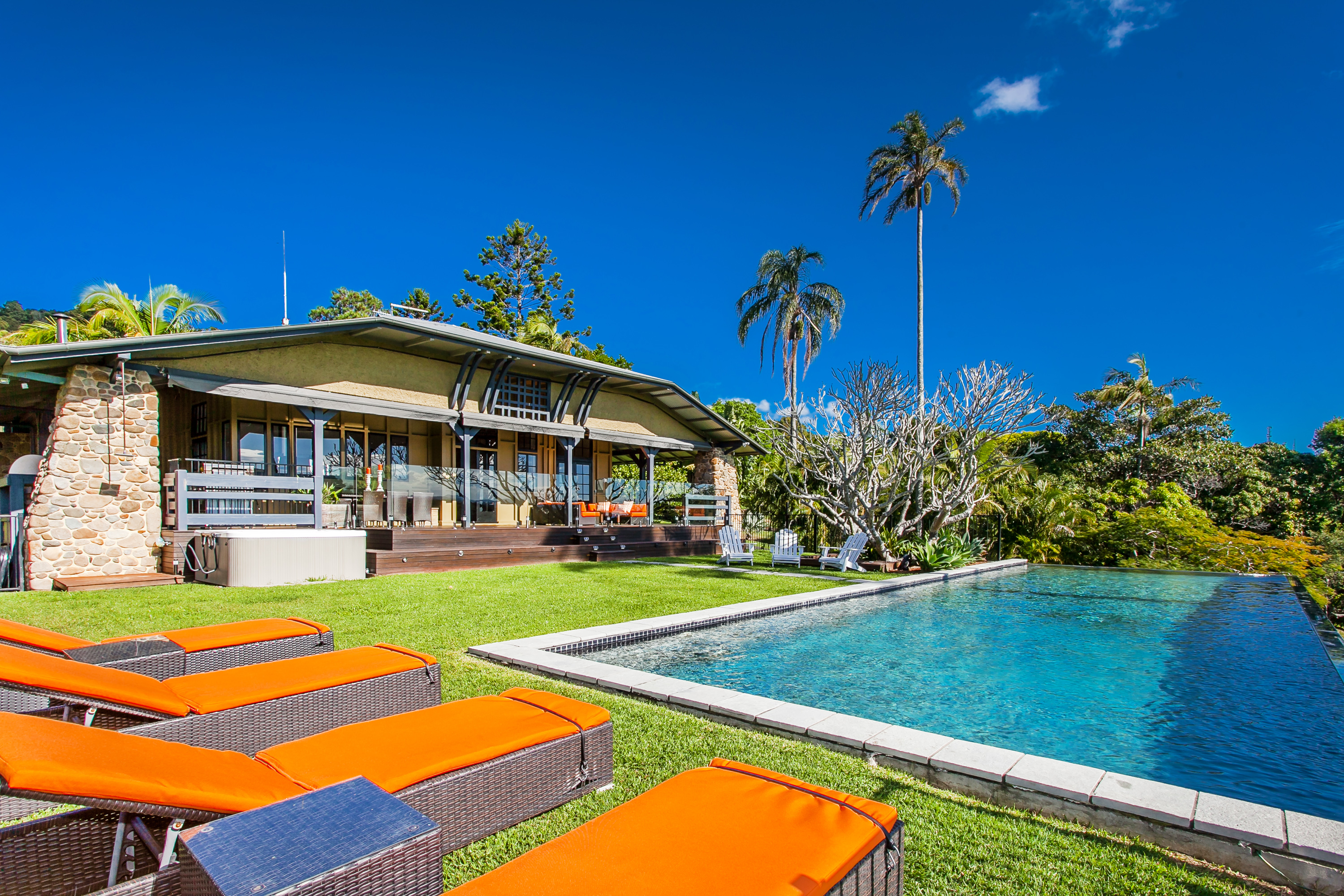
Koreelah, Byron Bay.

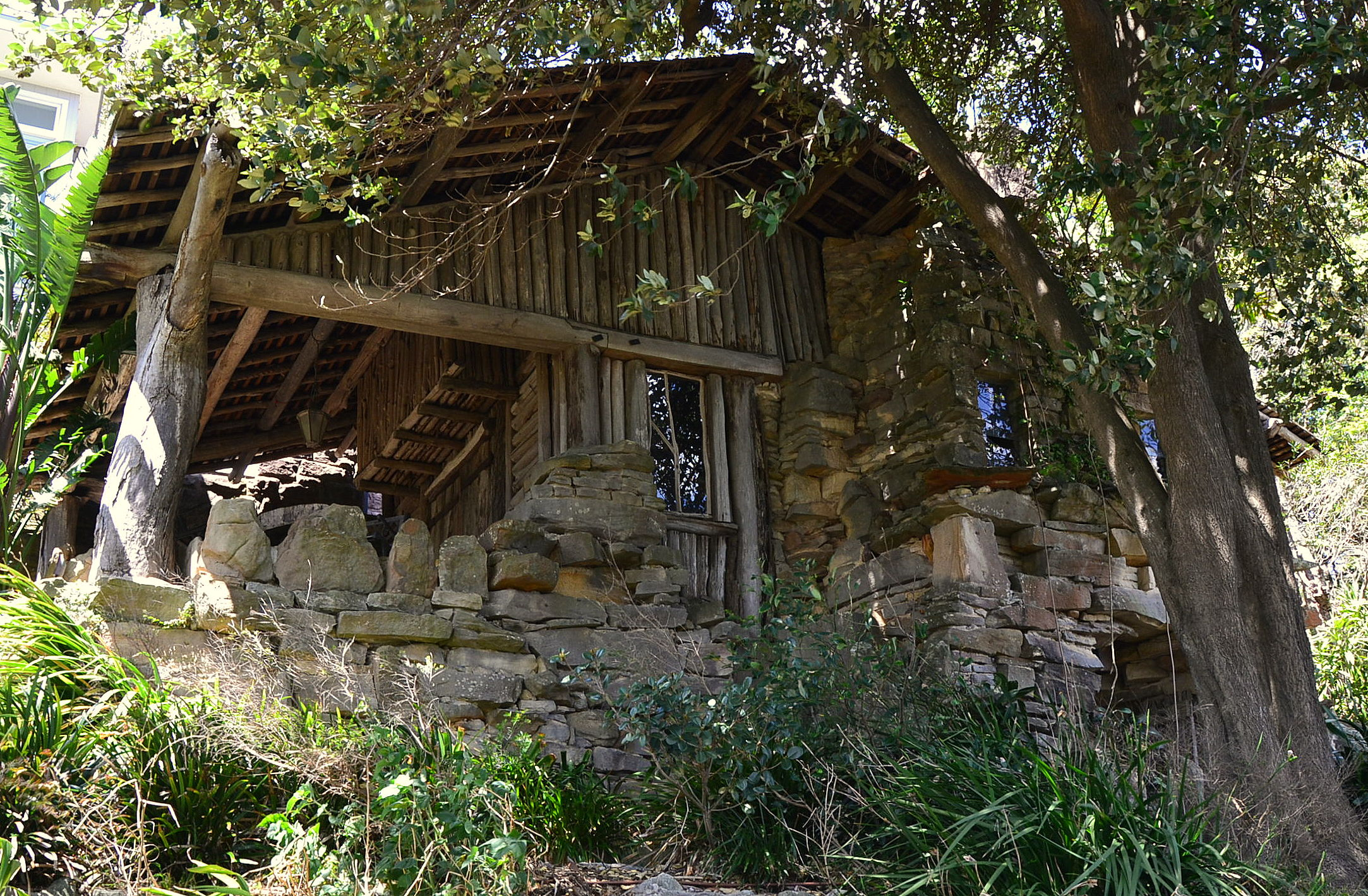
Loggan Rock, Avalon

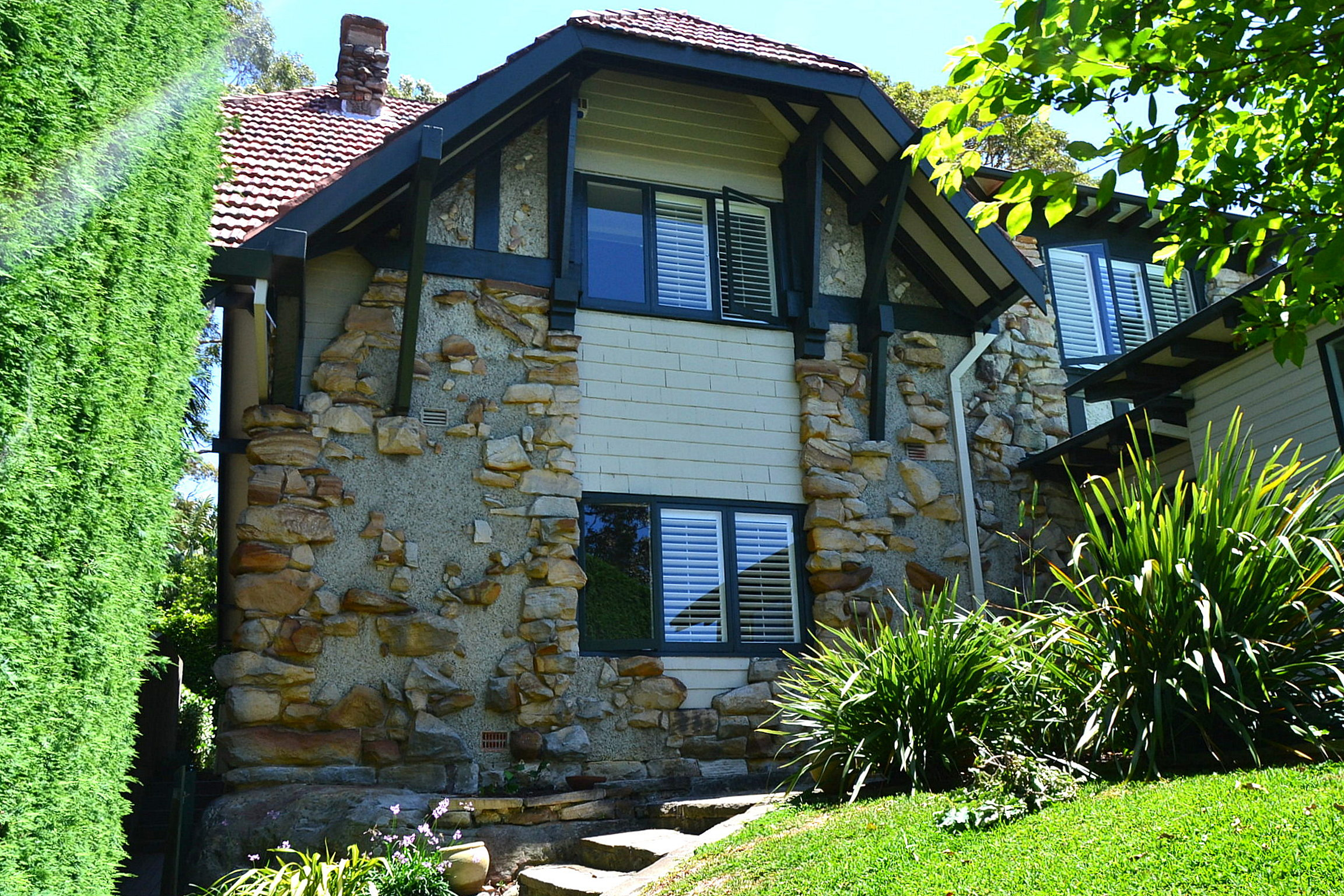
Noonee, Balmoral

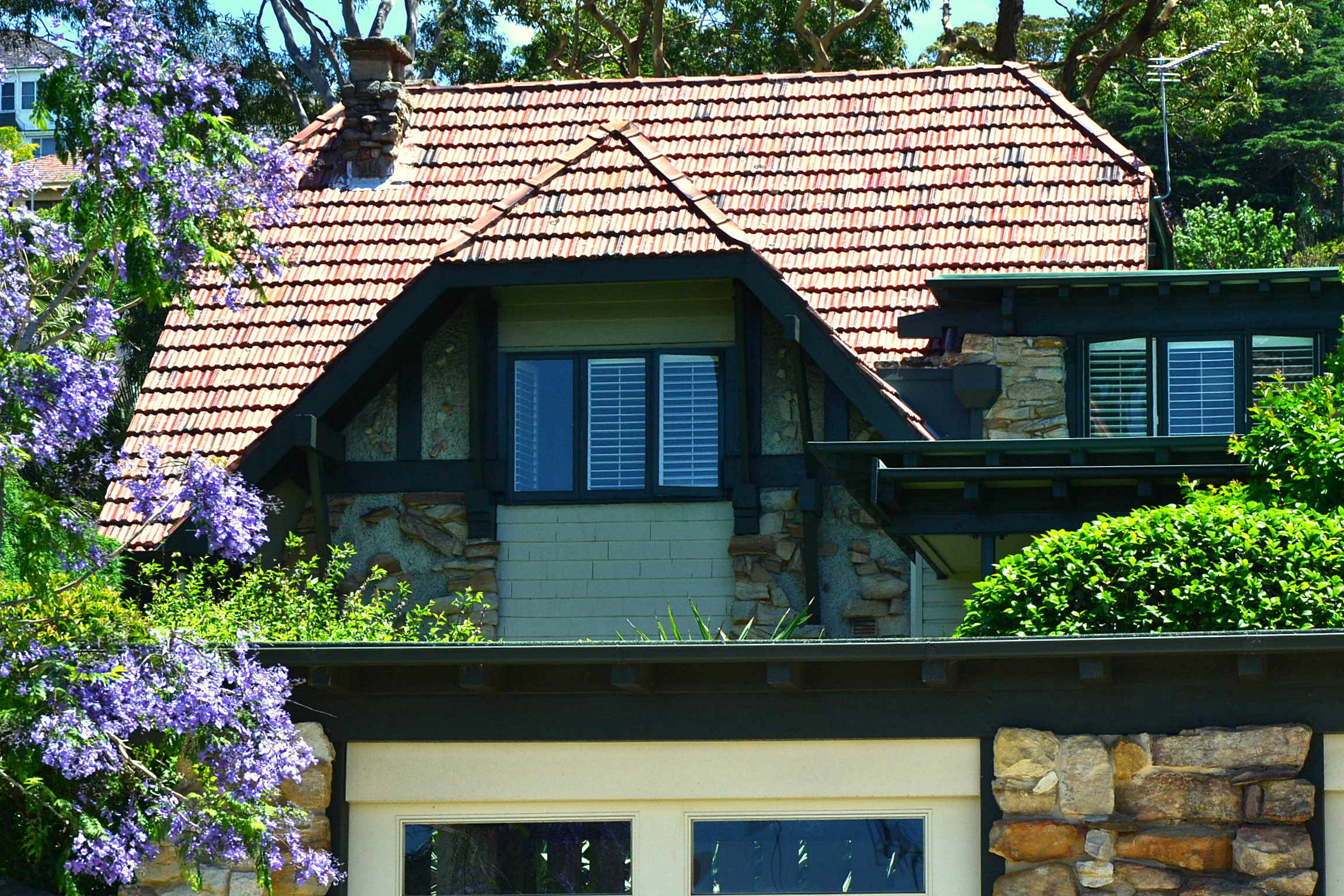
Noonee, upper floor

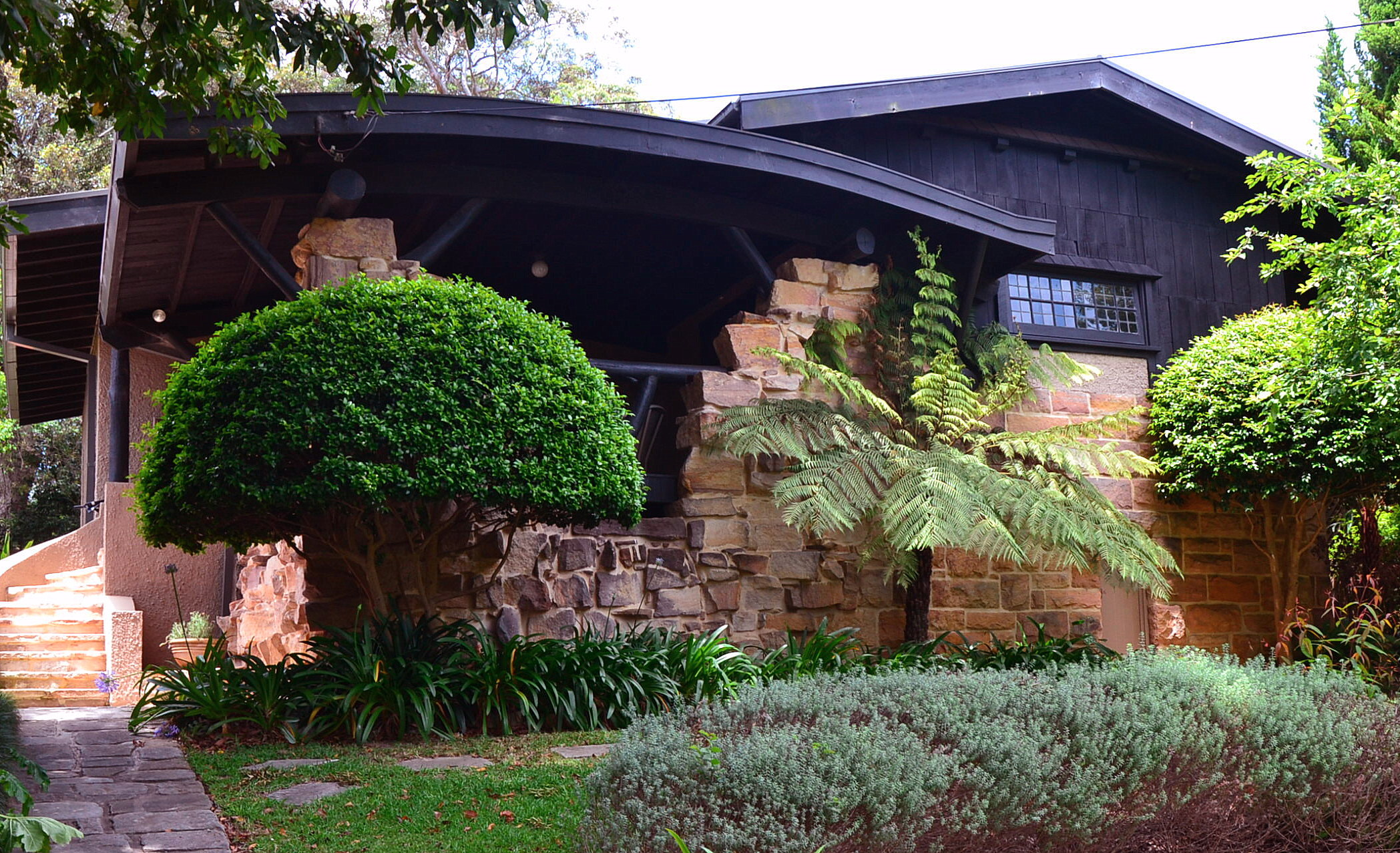
Nebraska, Gordon

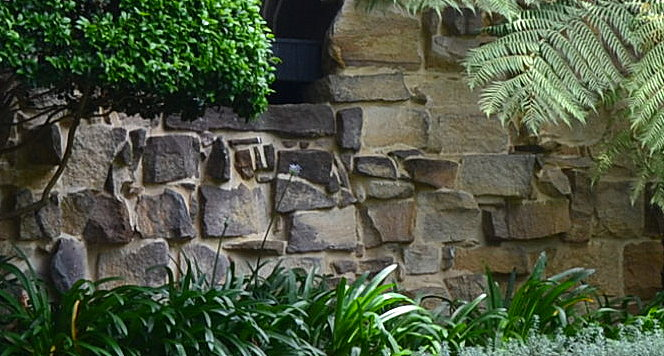
Nebraska, stonework

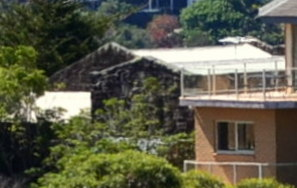
Careel House, Whale Beach

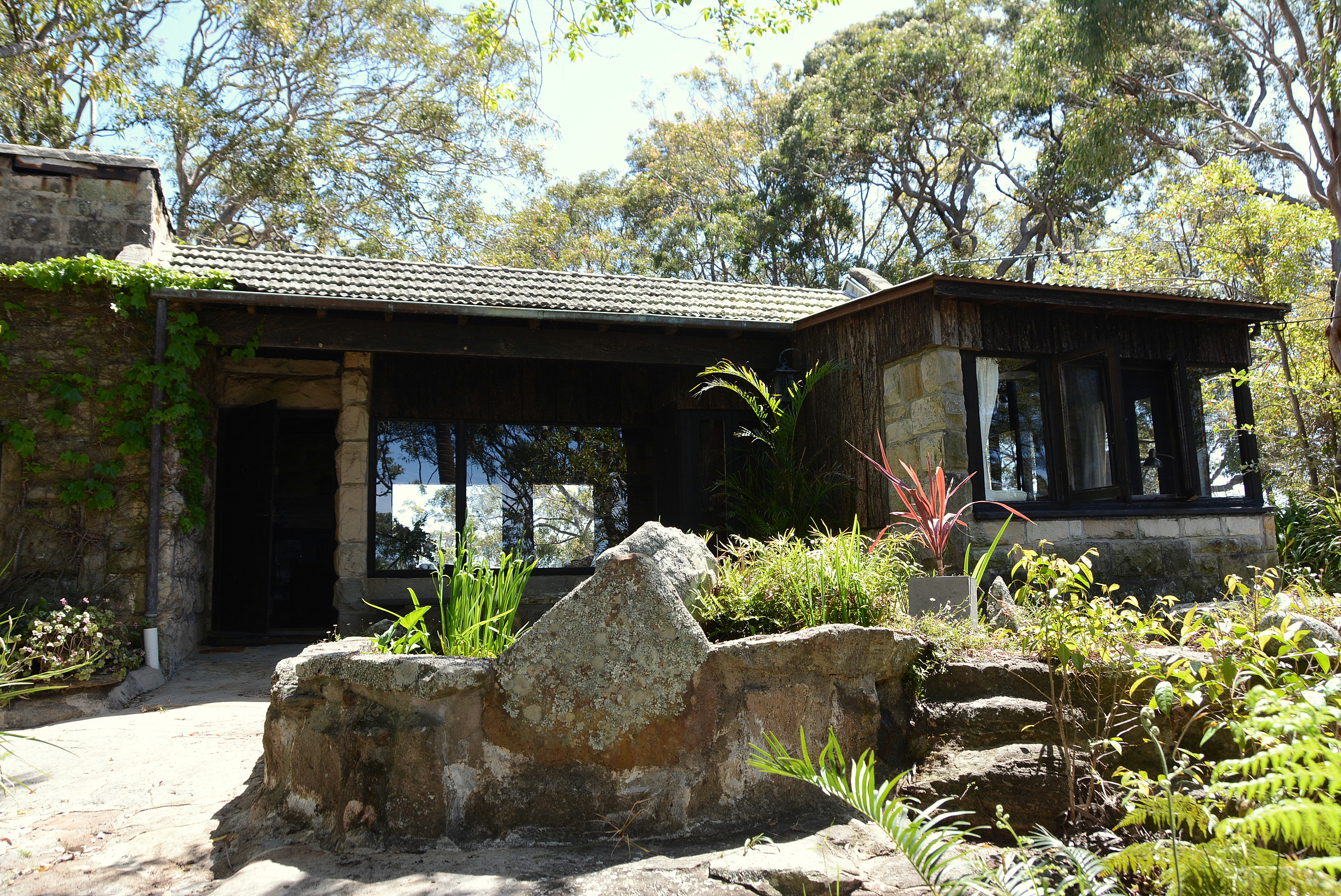
Hy Brasil, Avalon

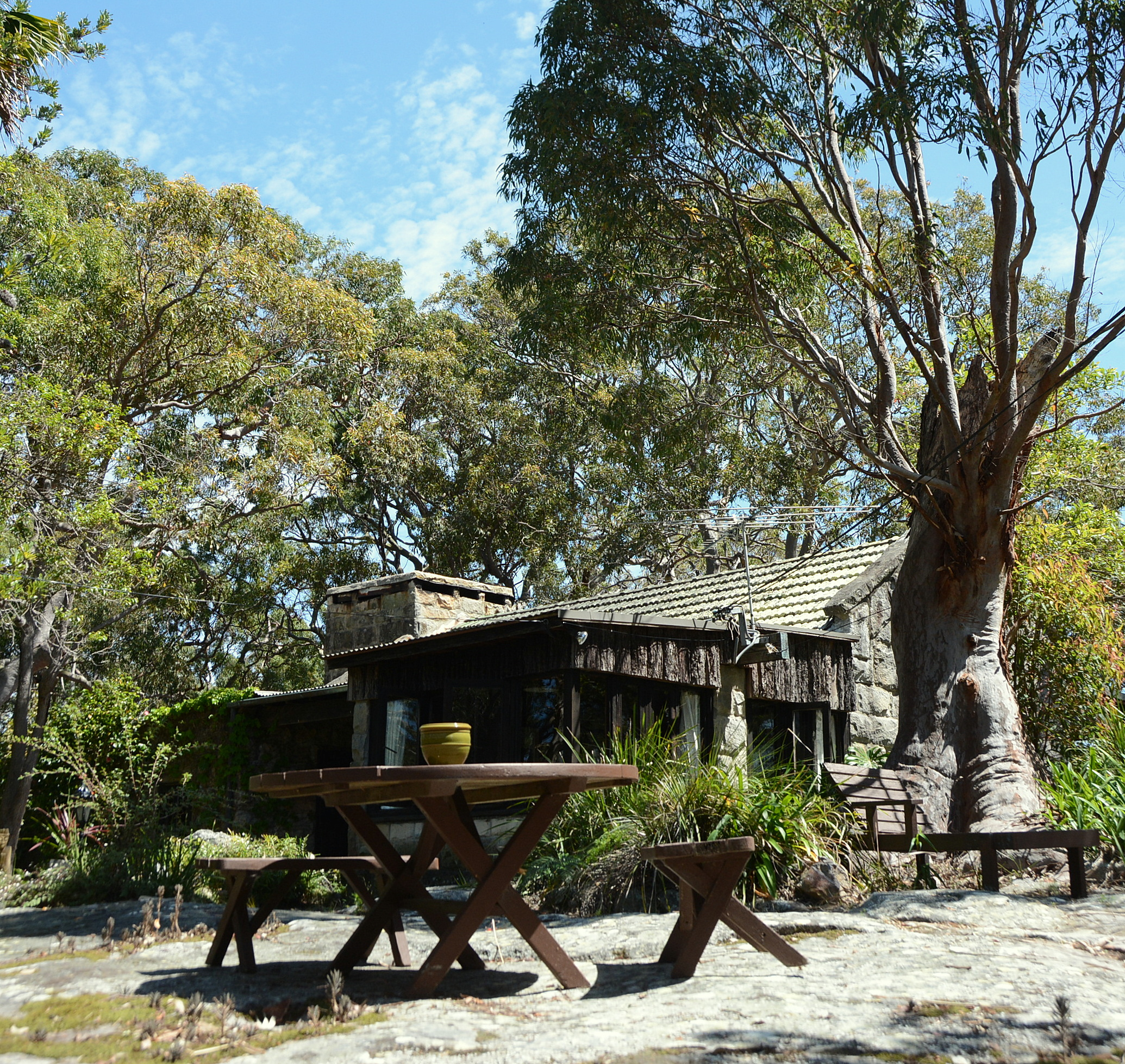
Hy-Brasil

== Partial list of works ==
- Koreelah, Byron Bay 1910
- Stone House, Tregeagle (1912)
- St Bartholomew's Anglican Church, Alstonville (1913)
- Uniting Church, Alstonville (1908)
- RSL, Alstonville
- Medical Centre, Alstonville
- CBC Bank, Alstonville
- Elephant House, also known as Stonehaven, Clareville (1933, demolished 1980)
- Belvedere, Cremorne (1919)
- Noonee, Balmoral (1919)
- Loggan Rock, Avalon (1929)
- Hy Brasil, Avalon (1936)
- Careel House, Whale Beach (1931)
- Nebraska, Gordon (1921)
