= Len Lawson =

Australian criminal and comic book creator (1927–2003)

- Born: Leonard Keith Lawson; 16 August 1927; Wagga Wagga, New South Wales
- Died: 29 November 2003 (aged 76); Grafton Correctional Centre, New South Wales
- Other names: Len Lawson; Lennie Lawson
- Occupations: Graphics artist; comic strip artist
- Status: Deceased
- Convictions: Murder (2 counts); Rape; Assault with intent to commit rape
- Penalty: Death; commuted to 14 years imprisonment (1954); Life imprisonment (1962)

Leonard Keith Lawson (16 August 1927 – 29 November 2003), was a notorious criminal who was sentenced to life imprisonment for rape and murder. He died in prison in 2003. Previously, he had been a bestselling Australian comic book creator, successful commercial artist and photographer.

Lawson first came to prominence as the creator of The Lone Avenger, an Australian comic book hero, whose first appearance was in the second issue of Action Comics in 1946 (unrelated to the American comics of the same name), running for thirteen years, eventually taking over the entire comic and selling up to 70,000 copies. The series was heavily influenced by Lone Ranger and other Western comics. Lawson also created another masked Western vigilante hero The Hooded Rider, as well as Diana, Queen of the Apes and Peter Fury.

In 1954, Lawson took five young models, ages 15 to 22, to bushland in Terrey Hills to take swimsuit photos for a calendar. He bound and gagged the women and sexually assaulted them, raping at least two of them. He raped one 15-year-old girl twice. At his trial, his lawyer, Jack Thomas, portrayed his victims as promiscuous liars who had consented to sexual intercourse, accusing them of "deliberately committing perjury to put a noose round this man's neck." The jury rejected this defense, convicting Lawson of two counts of rape and one lesser count of assault with intent to commit rape, and sentenced to death by Justice Clancy. The judge expressed hope that Lawson's death sentence would be carried out, saying nothing about the case warranted leniency: "In your case, I think there is no reason why the law should not be carried into execution."

However, Lawson's sentence was commuted to 14 years in prison since nobody had been executed in New South Wales since 1939 and it was now standard policy to commute all death sentences to prison term. Lawson asked to continue producing The Lone Avenger in prison, but it was handed to another artist. Due to the publicity from the case, the Australian comics industry received heavy scrutiny, with many engaging in self-censorship practices, and adopting the practices of the US Comics Code Authority. The comic was subsequently banned in Queensland and withdrawn by its publisher. Lawson was released from prison in 1961 after serving seven years, half his sentence.

On 7 November 1962, Lawson sexually assaulted and murdered 16-year-old Jane Bower, whose portrait he was painting in his apartment. The next day, he took several hostages at the Sydney Church of England Girls' Grammar School at Moss Vale, killing 15-year-old Wendy Luscombe in the ensuing siege while a teacher attempted to wrestle away his gun. He was sentenced to life imprisonment. While at Parramatta Gaol, Lawson attacked female dancer Sharon Hamilton, who was performing as part of a dance group for inmates. This was seemingly part of an escape attempt. Hamilton was reportedly traumatised by the attack and killed herself six years later. He died in Grafton Correctional Centre in November 2003.
