= Clarence Correctional Centre =

Prison in New South Wales, Australia

Clarence Correctional Centre 313 Avenue Road Lavadia 2462
- Location in New South Wales
- Location: Lavadia, New South Wales, Australia; 29°39′51.2″S 153°03′32.3″E
- Status: Operational
- Security class: Maximum / Minimum
- Capacity: 1,700
- Opened: 25 July 2020
- Managed by: Corrective Services New South Wales

Clarence Correctional Centre is a minimum- and maximum-security prison for men and women located near Grafton, New South Wales, Australia. It holds inmates sentenced under State or Australian criminal law. It has 1,700 beds, making it the largest prison in Australia. It is operated by Serco. The prison opened on 25 July 2020. The project was delivered by the NSW Government in partnership with the NorthernPathways consortium consisting of John Holland, Serco, John Laing and Macquarie Capital. Pedavoli Architects designed and delivered the Clarence Correctional Centre in Grafton. It is located 20 kilometres away from the old Grafton Correctional Centre, which it replaced.

== See also ==
- List of prisons in Australia
