= Mosman Village Church =

- St Clement's Anglican Church, Mosman
- Mosman Village Church
- 33°50′00″S 151°14′24″E
- Country: Australia
- Denomination: Anglican
- Churchmanship: Evangelical
- Website: www.mosmanvillage.church

History
- Former name(s): St Clement's Anglican Church, Mosman
- Founded: 26 August 1888

Administration
- Diocese: Sydney
- Parish: Mosman

Mosman Village Church (formally known as St Clement's Anglican Church) is an Anglican church located at 144 Raglan Street, Mosman, New South Wales, Australia. The church held its first public church service on Sunday, 26 August 1888.

The church holds 3 services each Sunday at 8am (a traditional Anglican Prayer Book service), 10am (a family focussed service with kids program) and 5:30pm (a more informal church service).

The church's location in Mosman, a scenic and affluent suburb of Sydney, also makes it a popular venue for weddings and other events.

== History ==
St Clement's Anglican Church was opened in August 1888, located on the same site as today at the corner of Canrobert Street and Raglan Street in Mosman, New South Wales.

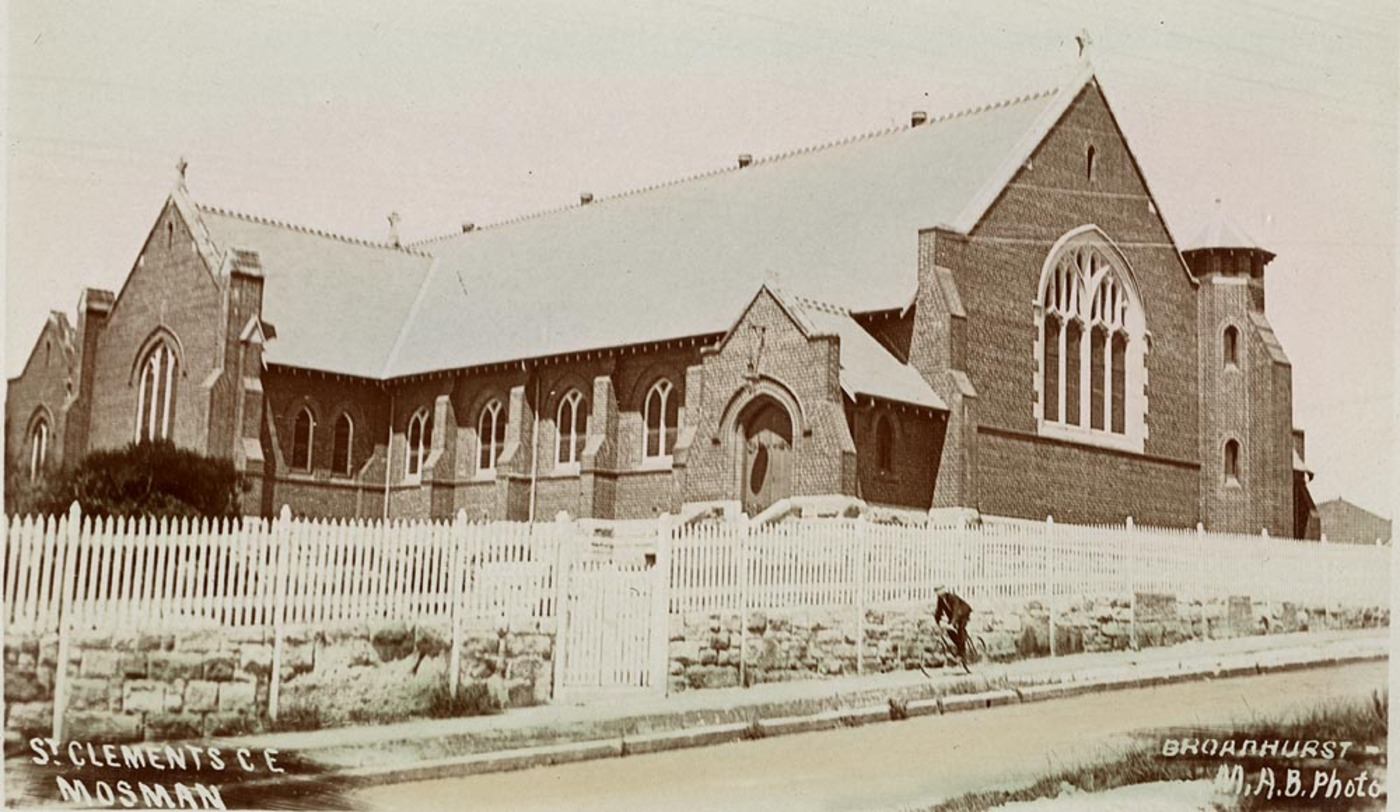
"St. Clement’s C.E. Church, Mosman" from Broadhurst collection of postcards of New South Wales scenes (1855–1927)

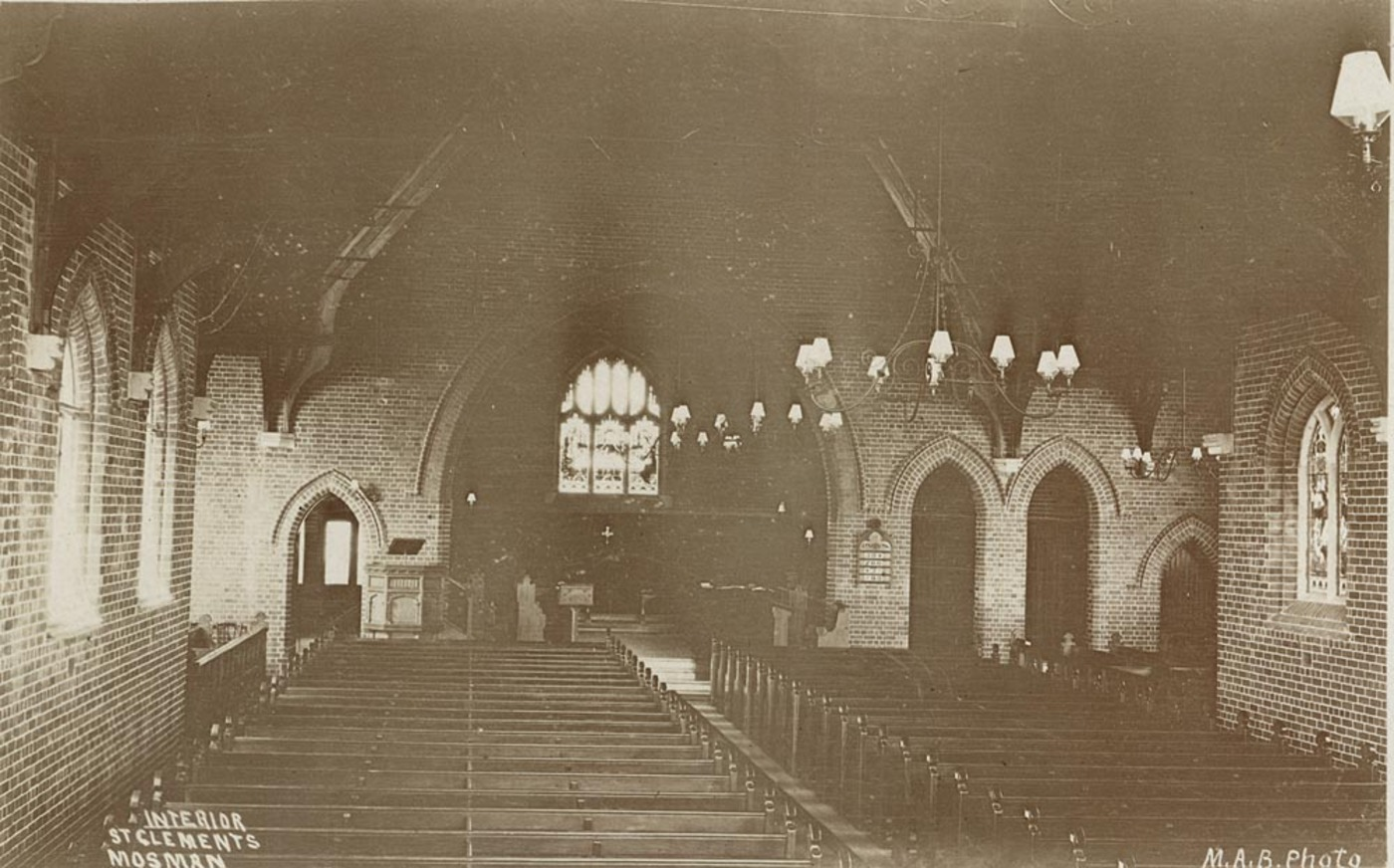
"Interior, St. Clement’s Church, Mosman" from Broadhurst collection of postcards of New South Wales scenes (1855–1927)

After 135 years, the church "announced a name change as part of a major re-brand designed to encourage local worshippers back to the Raglan Street parish."

== Vision ==
Mosman Village Church's vision is "to know Jesus and make Jesus known". In order to realise this vision, the church has a 4-part strategy:

1. Gather – To be a gathering church where its members regularly gather for church.
2. Grow – To be a relational church where people are growing in their relationships with each other and with God.
3. Give – To be a serving church where people generously give of their finances, time and attention.
4. Go – To be a evangelistic church where people take the gospel of Jesus Christ with them and share it with people in their sphere of influence.

== Schools ==
The church works closely with Mosman Preparatory School, Mosman Public School and Mosman High School helping the schools' various religious education programs.

== Building and architecture ==
The church building is an example of Gothic Revival architecture. The church's architecture is characterized by its high, vaulted ceilings, pointed arches, and stained glass windows. The interior of the church is decorated with intricate wood carvings, stone masonry, and decorative plasterwork.
