= Egglemont =

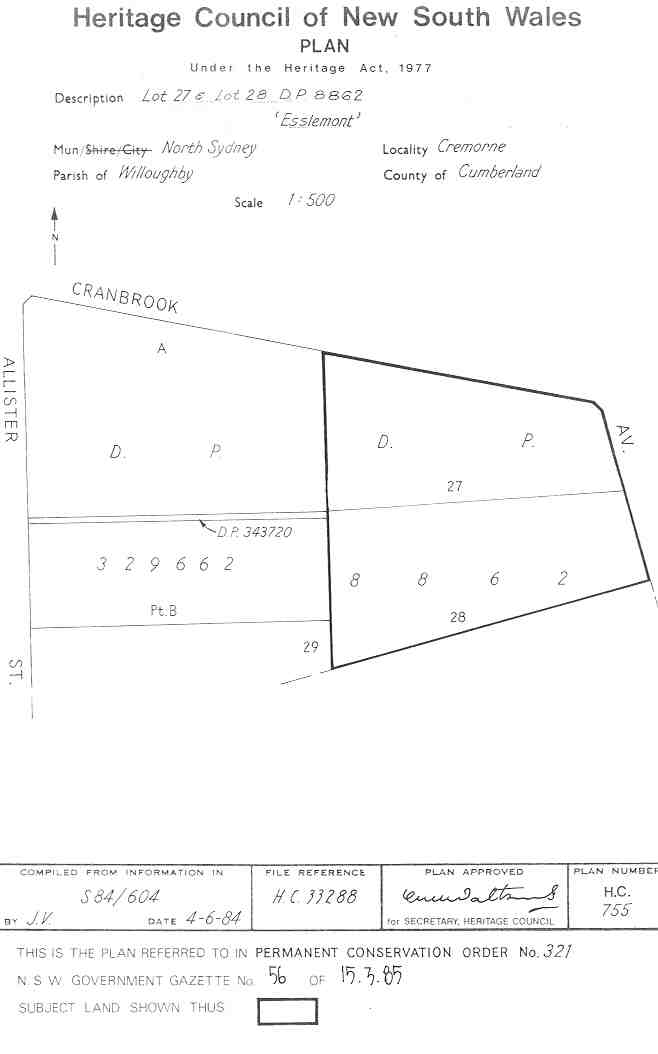
- Heritage boundaries

- Location within Sydney Location within Australia
- 33°49′55″S 151°13′43″E
- Location: 11 Cranbrook Avenue, Cremorne, North Sydney Council, New South Wales, Australia

History
- Built: 1916–1918

Site notes
- Architectural style: Californian Bungalow

New South Wales Heritage Register
- Official name: Egglemont; Esslemont
- Type: State heritage (built)
- Designated: 2 April 1999
- Reference no.: 321
- Type: House
- Category: Residential buildings (private)

Egglemont is a heritage-listed residence at 11 Cranbrook Avenue, Cremorne, New South Wales, a suburb of Sydney, Australia. It was built from 1916 to 1918. It is also known as Esslemont. It was added to the New South Wales State Heritage Register on 2 April 1999.

== History ==
Egglemont was built in c. 1916 / 1918 in the Californian Bungalow style with a garden typical of that period. It is a four bedroom house. In latter years the property was owned by property developer Michael and Kimberley McGurk. Michael McGurk was murdered outside the property in September 2009. The property was sold in October 2011.

== Description ==
Built on a slight hill, Egglemont is surrounded by a low plaster wall and pruned hedge. A crazy-paved path leads to the front door from the street foot entrance where the name "Esslemont" is carved into a low sandstone gateway. Planter beds flank a wide stairway that ascends to the front door. A second entrance on the uphill side of the house enters alongside the adjacent tennis courts. A separate single garage and lawn are also adjacent to the tennis courts on the property.

The house interior includes "a billiard room, large sunroom, dressing room and ensuite bathroom to the main bedroom, kitchen, laundry and scullery configured for use by domestic staff.". There are 3 additional bedrooms in addition to the main bedroom.

== Heritage listing ==
Egglemont was listed on the New South Wales State Heritage Register on 2 April 1999.

== See also ==
- Australian residential architectural styles
