= Cremorne, New South Wales =

Cremorne
- Suburb
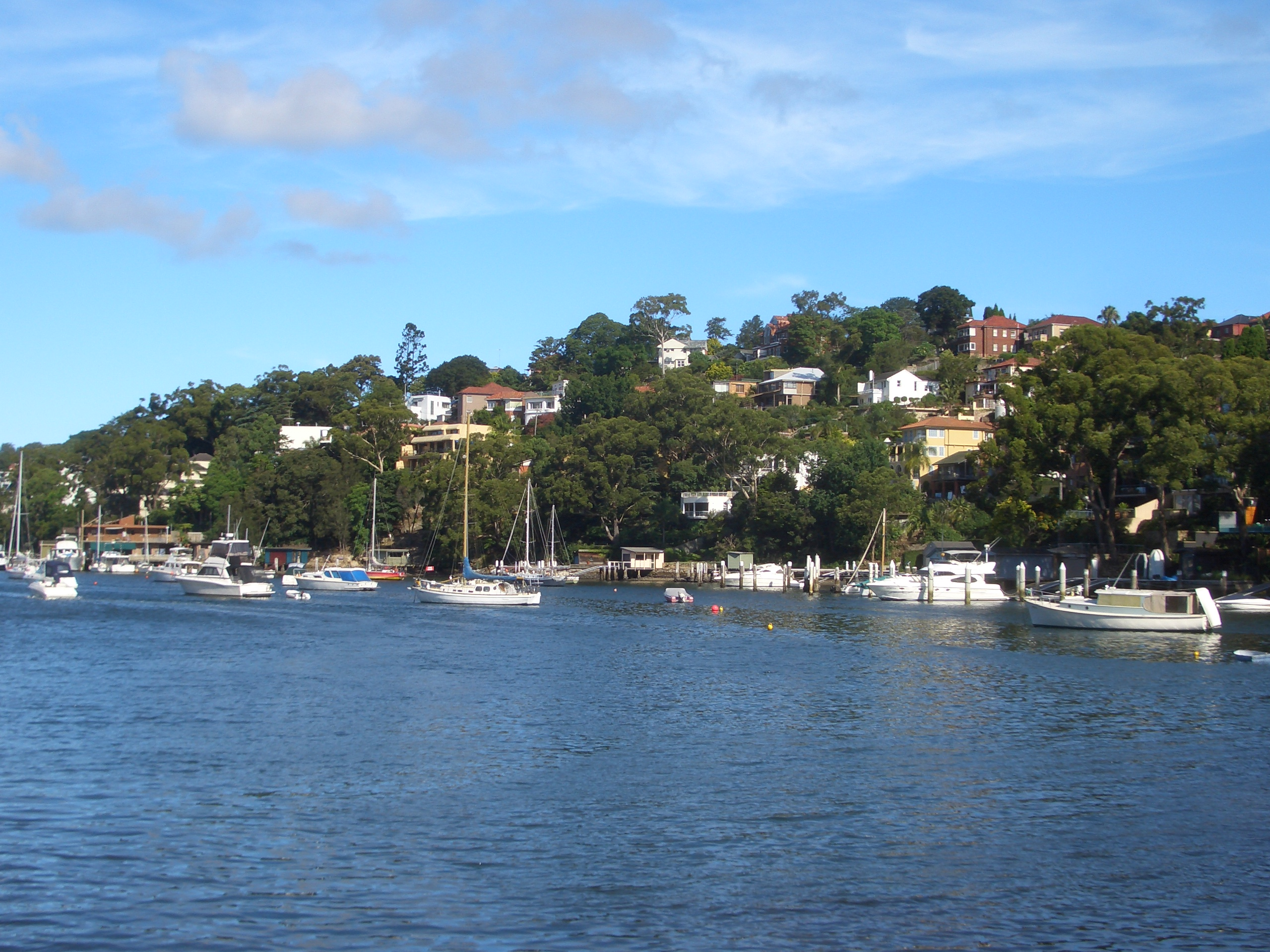
- View of Cremorne from Willoughby Bay

- Interactive map of Cremorne
- Country: Australia
- State: New South Wales
- City: Sydney
- LGA: North Sydney Council
- Location: 6 km (3.7 mi) north-east of Sydney CBD

Government
  - State electorate: North Shore, Willoughby
  - Federal division: Warringah

Area
  - Total: 1.63 km^{2} (0.63 sq mi)
- Elevation: 85 m (279 ft)

Population
  - Total: 11,263 (SAL 2021)
- Postcode: 2090
Suburbs around Cremorne
Cammeray	Northbridge	Mosman
Neutral Bay	Cremorne	Mosman
Neutral Bay	Cremorne Point

Cremorne is a suburb on the Lower North Shore of Sydney, New South Wales, Australia, located six kilometres north-east of the Sydney central business district, in the local government area of North Sydney Council.

Cremorne Junction is a locality within the suburb. Immediately adjacent to the suburb, to the south, is the small residential suburb of Cremorne Point. Cremorne is situated between Mosman and Neutral Bay.

== History ==
=== Aboriginal culture ===
Prior to the arrival of the First Fleet, the area in which Cremorne is situated was inhabited by the Cammeraygal group of the Kuringgai Aboriginal nation. The group, which inhabited the north shore of Port Jackson, was one of the largest in the Sydney area.

=== European settlement ===
Cremorne was named after the Cremorne Gardens in London, a popular pleasure ground in England, which derived its name from the Old Irish words Crích Mugdornd (modern Irish: Críoch Mhúrn), meaning 'boundary' or 'chieftain' of Mugdornd. Cremorne, the Anglicisation of the Gaelic name Críoch Mhúrn, roughly meaning the 'Bounds of Mourne', was a barony in County Monaghan from which an Irish peer, The 1st Viscount Cremorne, took his title. Lord Cremorne gave his name to his London residence in what became the Cremorne Gardens. Other sources claim that rather than referring to a Chieftain, it refers to the territorial area of an ancient tribal group in County Monaghan. The Cremorne Gardens, Sydney, were established on the peninsula leading to Robertson Point in 1856, following the Cremorne Gardens, Melbourne, in 1853, just two of many such developments throughout Australia from the mid-nineteenth to early twentieth century. Although the Gardens closed in 1862, they gave their name both to the suburb at their location at Cremorne Point and to the suburb of Cremorne itself to the north.

== Heritage listings ==
Cremorne has a number of heritage-listed sites on the New South Wales State Heritage Register (SHR) and the North Sydney Local Environmental Plan 2013 (LEP), including:

- 8 Bannerman Street: Dalkeith Property (SHR & LEP)
- 7 Cranbrook Avenue: Belvedere (Cremorne) (SHR & LEP)
- 11 Cranbrook Avenue: Egglemont (SHR & LEP)
- 274 Military Road: SCEGGS Redlands (LEP)
- 380 Military Road: Hayden Orpheum Picture Palace (LEP)
- 53–57 Murdoch Street: Cremorne Girls High School (Former) (LEP)

== Commercial area ==
Cremorne is a mainly residential area with its commercial area centred along Military Road, around Cremorne Junction. Cremorne has a supermarket, a high-rise hotel known as Park Regis Concierge Apartments and a number of restaurants and shops. The Cremorne Town Centre includes the Cremorne Hotel. The commercial zone is smaller than neighbouring Neutral Bay. Small companies lease office space in this area.

Cremorne features a historic cinema, the Hayden Orpheum Picture Palace. In an Art Deco style, it features a Wurlitzer pipe-organ that is played at selected film screenings. The cinema was designed by G. N. Kenworthy and constructed in 1935 by Angelo Virgona. Its restoration was undertaken in 1987 by its new owner, television personality Mike Walsh.

== Demographics ==
At the 2021 census, there were 11,263 residents in Cremorne. Of these:

- 58.7% of people were born in Australia. The most common other countries of birth were England 7.0%, China (excluding SARs and Taiwan) 3.2%, New Zealand 2.5%, South Africa 2.1% and the United States of America 1.3%. The most common ancestries in Cremorne were English 36.0%, Australian 24.5%, Irish 13.2%, Scottish 10.4% and Chinese 8.9%. 74.4% of people only spoke English at home. Other languages spoken at home included Mandarin 3.6%, Cantonese 2.1%, Spanish 1.9%, Japanese 1.6% and Portuguese 1.2%.
- The median weekly household income was $2,481, compared to the national median household income of $1,746. The personal median income was $1,502, much higher than the national average of $805. The median family income was $3,708, significantly higher than the national median of $2,120.
- The residents were of a similar range of ages to the rest of Australia; their median age was 40 years, compared to the average nationwide of 38. Children aged under 15 years made up 15.0% of the population (the national average was 18.2%) and people aged 65 years and over made up 18.1% of the population (the national average was 15.1%).
- The most common responses for religion were No Religion 44.5%, Catholic 20.7%, Anglican 12.9% and Buddhism 2.9%, 5.1% of respondents elected not to disclose their religion.
- The average household held 2.1 people; with an average of 1.3 motor vehicles. Flats or apartments made up 71.4% of private dwellings, followed by 17.1% separate houses and Semi-detached, row or terrace house, townhouse etc. 11.2%.

== Schools ==
A co-educational private school, SCECGS Redlands, has its senior campus in Military Road and its junior and middle campus in Alister Street.

== Housing ==
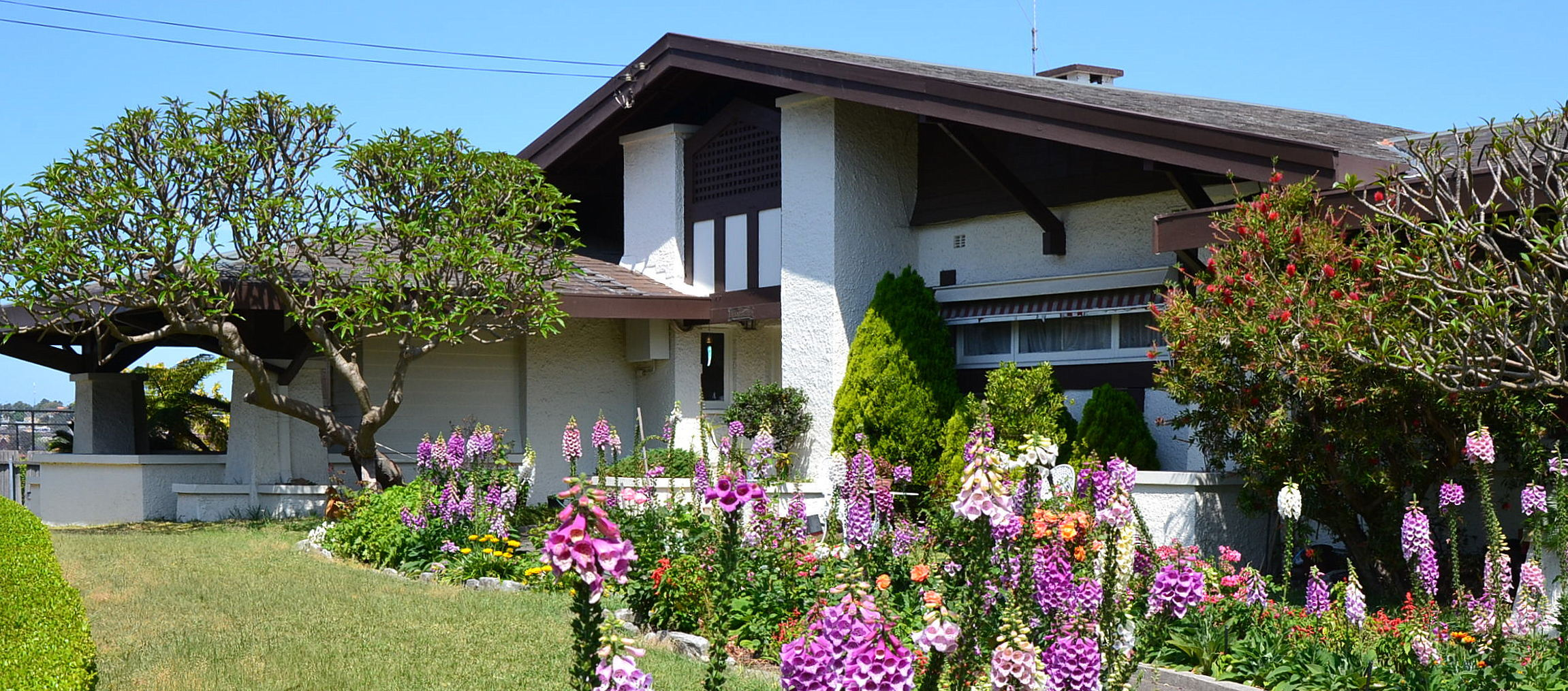
Belvedere, Cranbrook Avenue

Cremorne is predominantly a residential area, with a wide variety of architectural styles. Federation styles are common. The California Bungalow style is also represented. The most outstanding example is Belvedere, in Cranbrook Avenue. An example of the larger California style, Belvedere was designed by Alexander Stewart Jolly and built in 1919. It has heritage listings at both state and federal levels.There are also a number of townhouses and duplexes in Cremorne, mostly near Ben Boyd Road. Apartments are also quite common with the tallest on being The Craigholm on Ben Boyd Road.

== Notable people ==
- Francesca Hung-Miss Universe Australia 2018

== Churches ==
- St Peter's Anglican Church: this church in Waters Road was built 1909–10. The architect was Ernest Albert Scott. The parish had existed as an independent entity since 1908.

== Transport ==
All transport to and from Cremorne is by road or water. Military Road connects Cremorne to Neutral Bay and the Sydney Harbour Bridge to the west, and to Mosman to the east.

Transport between Military Road and Sydney CBD is available via Keolis Australia routes 100, 243, 246, 249, 180X, 181X, 190X, B1 and BN1 (night service). Other bus routes on Military Road provide regular services to the business districts in North Sydney, Chatswood, Mosman and the Northern Beaches, including routes 114, 144, 154X, 229 and 230. The Sydney Ferries Mosman Bay ferry service runs between Cremorne Point, Old Cremorne, Mosman Bay and Circular Quay.

== Gallery ==
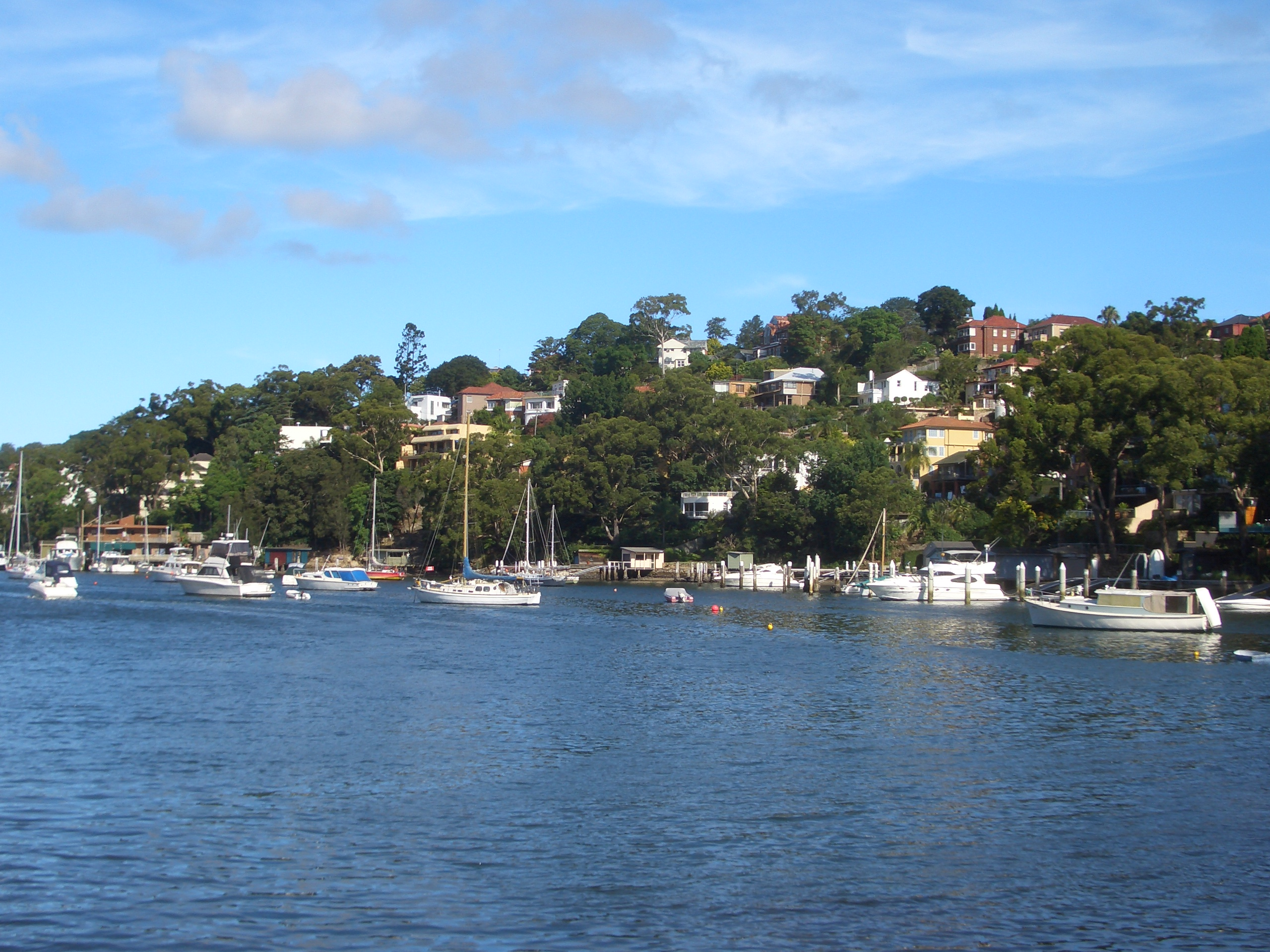
Willoughby Bay

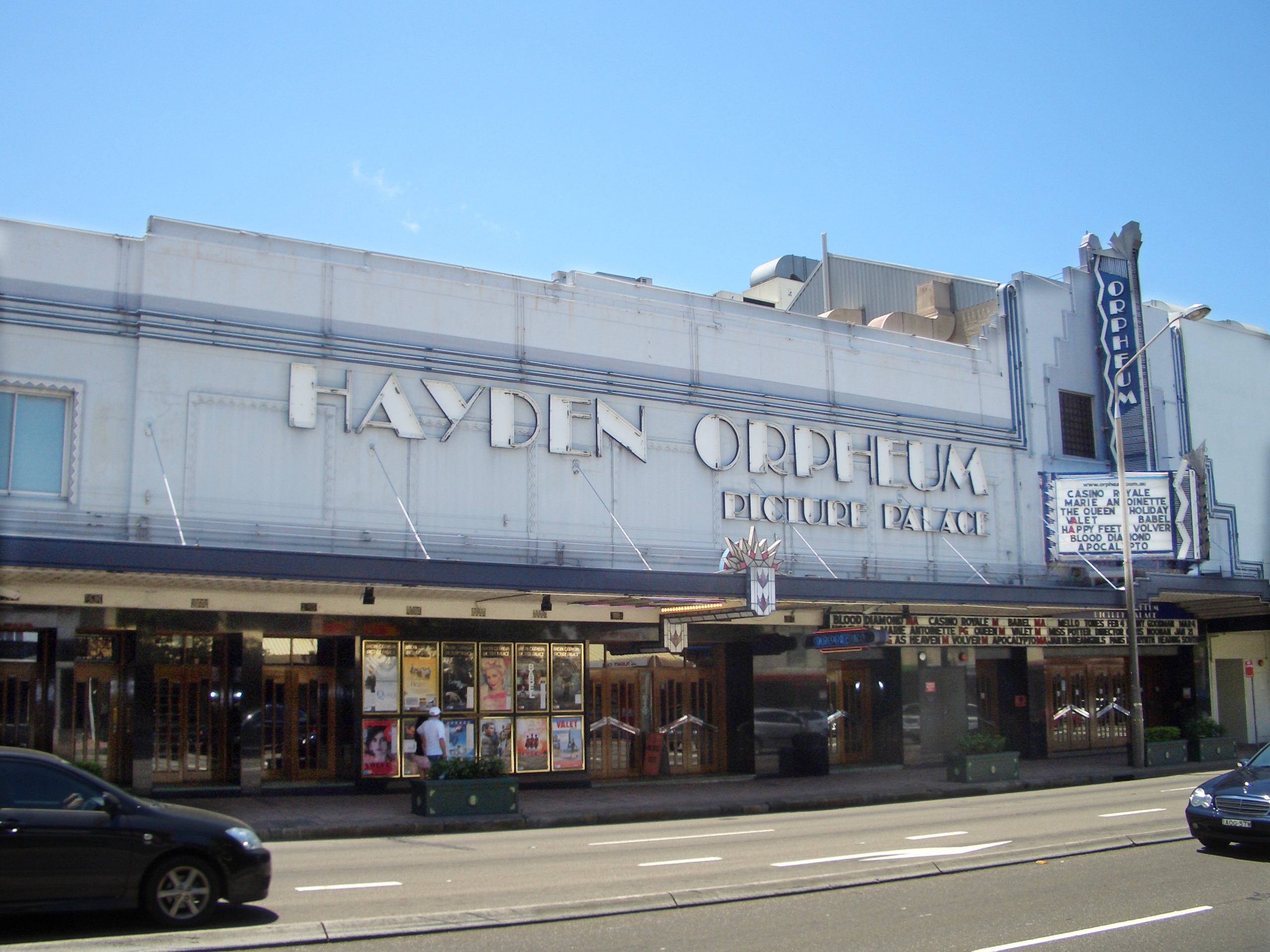
Hayden Orpheum Picture Palace

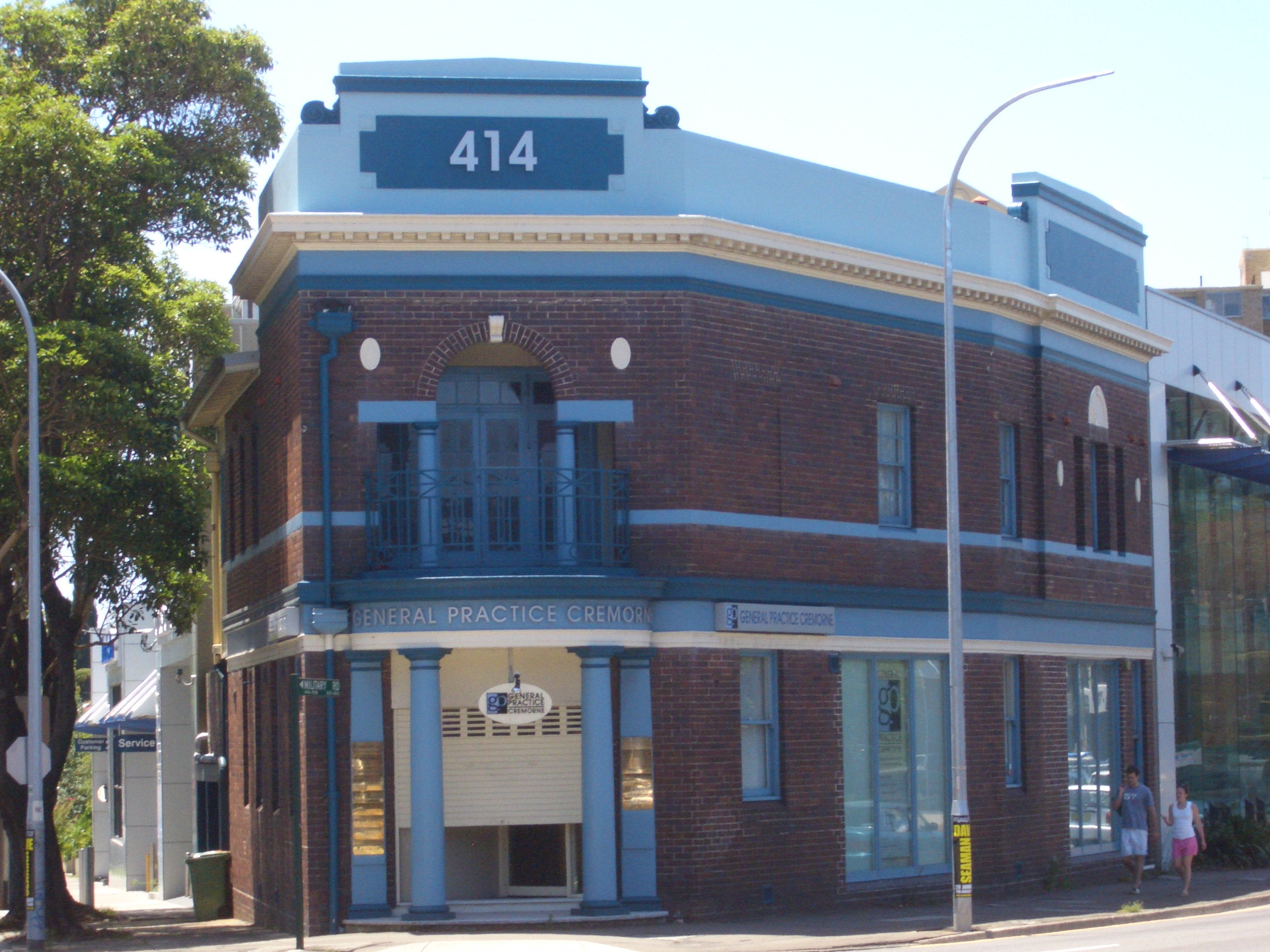
General Practice Cremorne

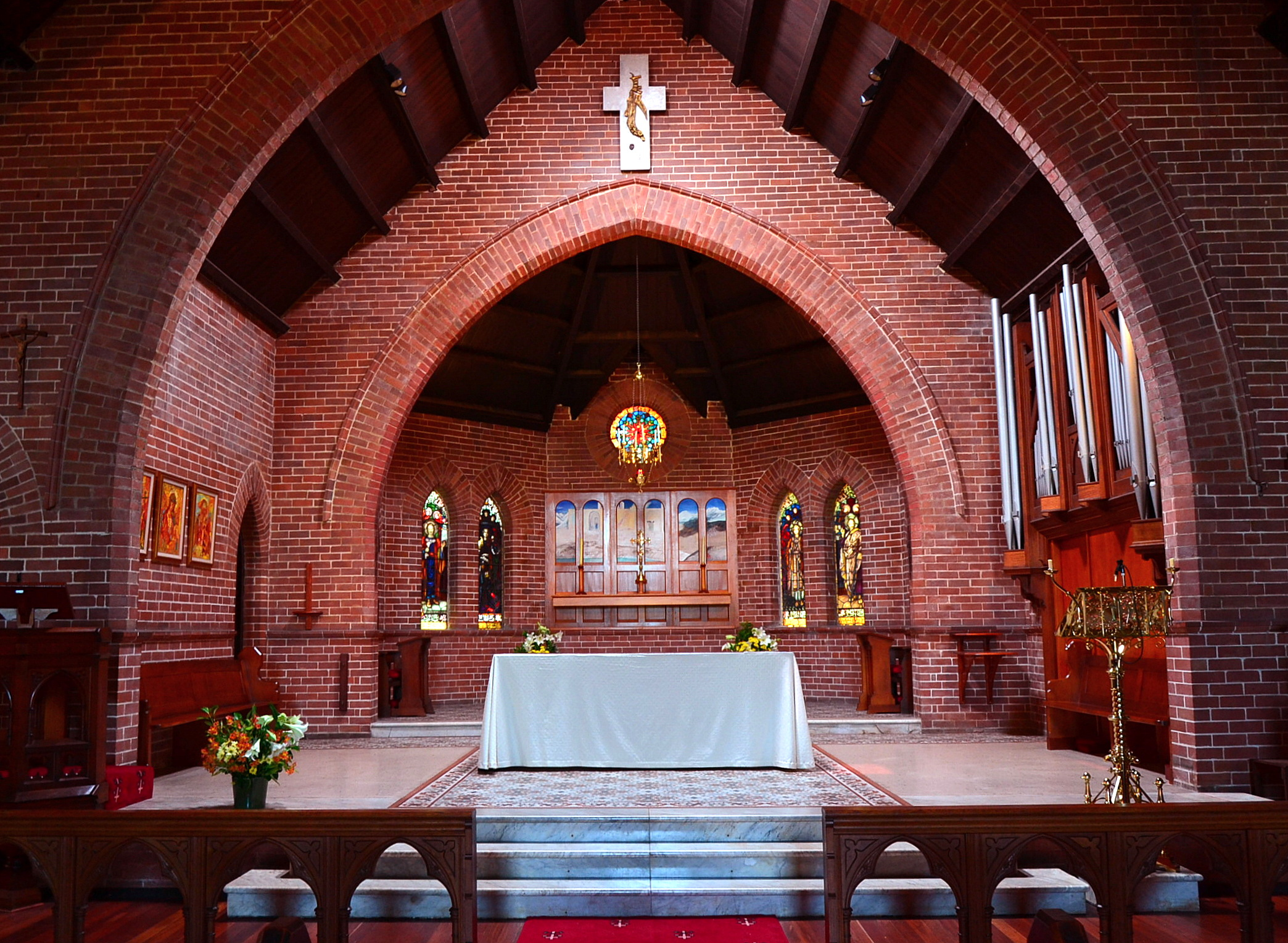
St Peter's Anglican Church

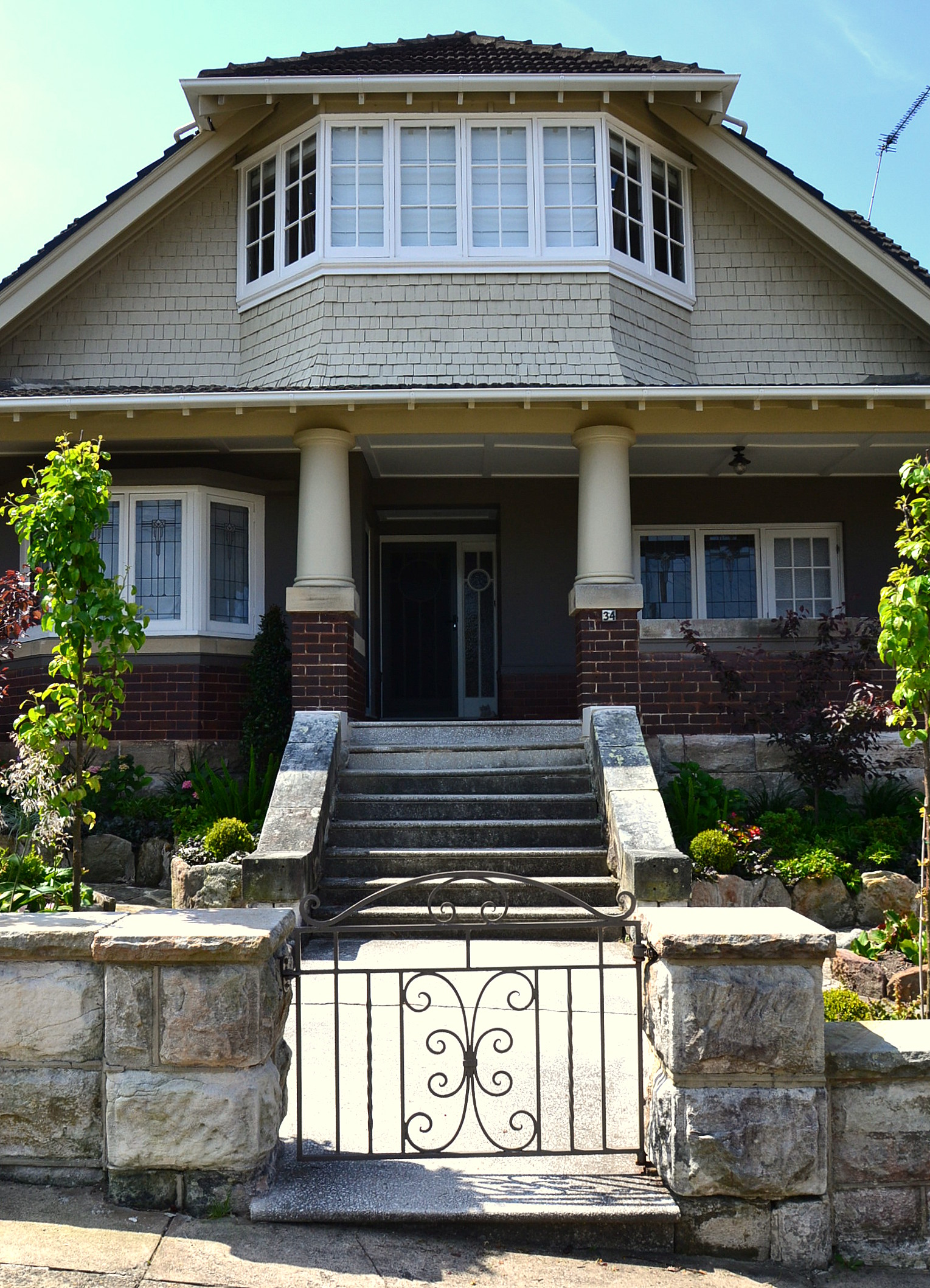
Home in the Bungalow style, Cranbrook Avenue
