= George Augustine Taylor =

Australian artist, journalist and inventor (1872-1928)

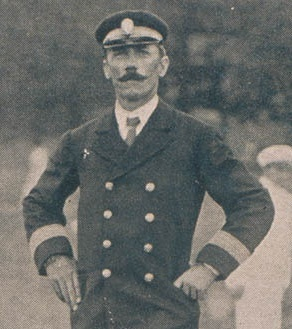
- Portrait of George Augustus Taylor, c.1910
- Born: 1 August 1872; Sydney, Australia
- Died: 20 January 1928 (aged 55)

George Augustine Taylor (1 August 1872 – 20 January 1928) was an Australian artist, journalist, and inventor.

== Life ==
Taylor was born at Sydney in 1872. He began his working life articled to an architect, a Mr Hobbs. Taylor was a member of the Dawn and Dusk Club, an association of bohemians and intellectuals that included the writer Henry Lawson. Taylor married Florence Mary Parsons in 1907.

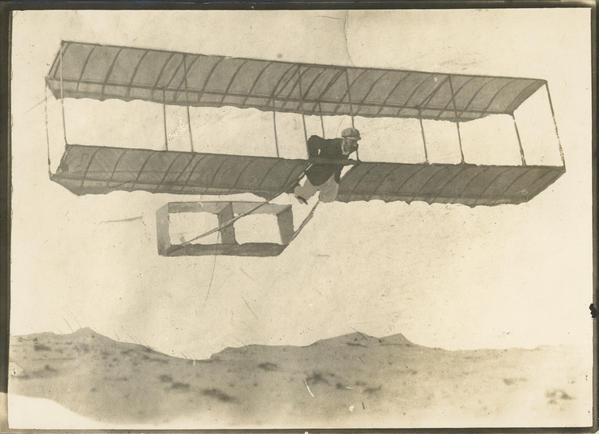
Taylor in his self-constructed glider at Narrabeen in 1909

He experimented with a motorless aeroplane (glider) and, in November 1909, constructed one of full size. He also contacted the retired inventor Lawrence Hargrave at this time. On 5 December 1909, at Narrabeen, Sydney, Taylor flew in the glider he had designed and became the first person in Australia to fly in a heavier-than-air craft. Florence Taylor flew in her husband's glider on the same day, followed by Edward Hallstrom. In March 1910 Taylor arranged a demonstration of wireless at Heathcote for his superior officers in the army. He enlisted the aid of three civilians to perform this task, Taylor not being an inventor or radio operator himself.{by wireless - how we got the signals through G.A.Taylor 1910} Messrs. Kirkby, Hannam and Reginald Wilkinson bought their own equipment with them, set it up, and performed the demonstrations. Taylor always used Kirkby to manufacture wireless sets and demonstrate wireless on other occasions, such as at his lecture on the air age and its significance. Hannam went on to be Mawson’s wireless operator on his Antarctic expeditions. Kirkby had built the Shaw wireless works.

At around this time he was also appointed to the invention and patents committee of the British Science Guild and was active in the encouragement of scientific innovation and "invention as the one hope of attaining permanent world peace, and a real betterment of the conditions of the human race".

An epileptic, he died as the result of a seizure in his bathtub on 20 January 1928 leaving his wife, Florence Mary Taylor; they had no children. The 25 January 1928 issue of the Construction and Local Government Journal contains an article 'The Life and Work of G. A. Taylor', which details the achievements and nature of this remarkable man.

== Works ==
- Taylor, George A., “By Wireless” How we got the signals through, Lieut Army Intelligence Corps
- Taylor, George A., The Air Age and its Military Significance, Lieut Army Intelligence Corps
- Taylor, George A., "Those Were The Days" being Reminiscences of Australian Artists and Writers

== Sources ==
- Bright Sparcs
- Serle, Percival (1949). "Taylor, George Augustine". Dictionary of Australian Biography. Sydney: Angus & Robertson. Accessed 21 October 2012
- Giles, J.M., The Life of George Augustine Taylor
