= Gore Hill Cemetery =

Cemetery in Gore Hill, Sydney, Australia

Gore Hill Memorial Cemetery
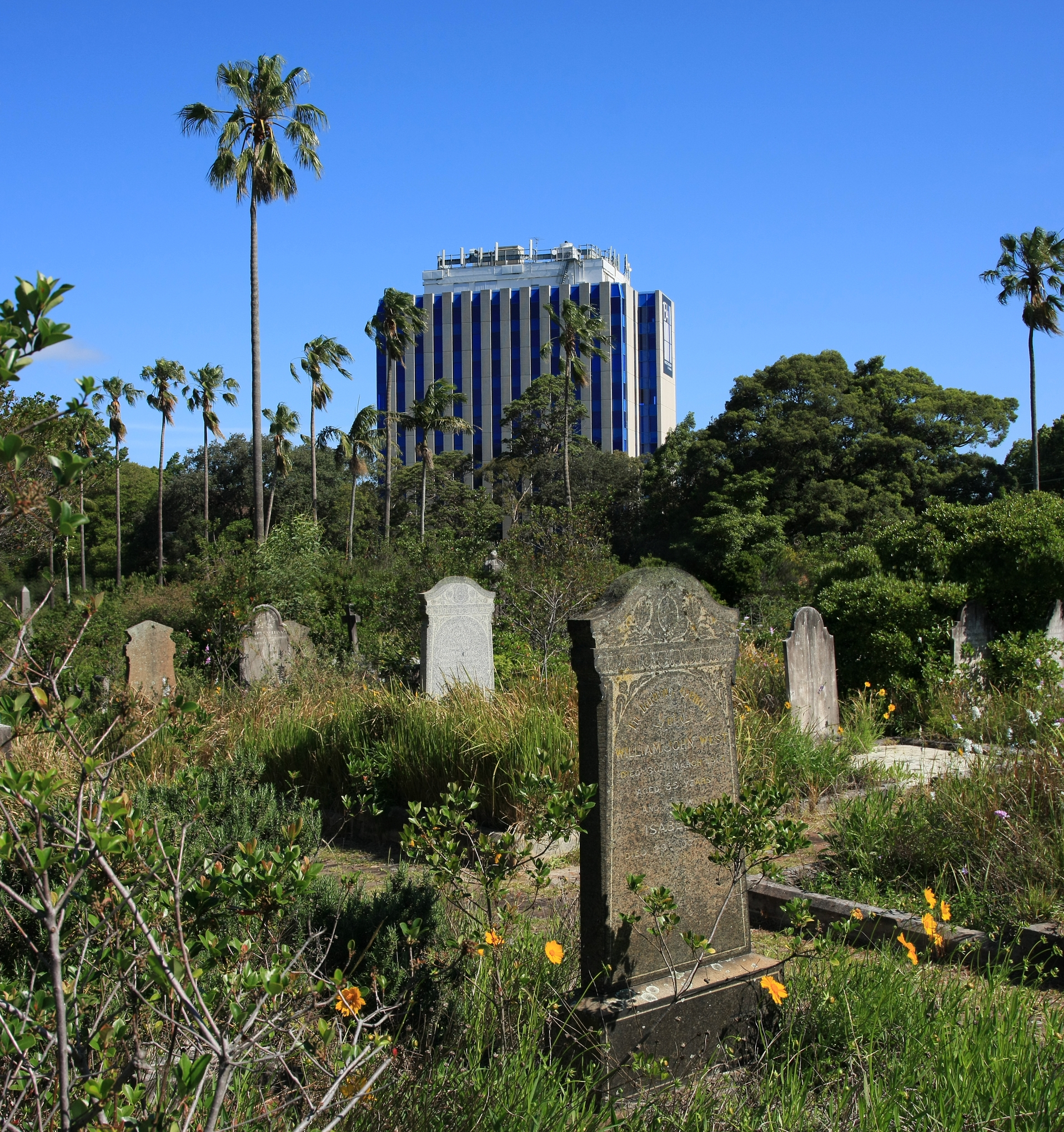
- General view of the cemetery
- Interactive map of Gore Hill Memorial Cemetery

Details
- Established: 19 May 1868
- Closed: 1974
- Location: Pacific Highway, Gore Hill, New South Wales
- Country: Australia
- Coordinates: 33°49′23″S 151°11′18″E
- Owned by: Cemeteries and Crematoria NSW
- Size: 5.07 hectares (12.5 acres)
- Website: nmclm.com.au/gore-hill/about-gore-hill/
- Find a Grave: Gore Hill Memorial Cemetery

New South Wales Heritage Register
- Official name: Gore Hill Memorial Cemetery; Gore Hill Cemetery
- Type: State heritage (landscape)
- Criteria: a, c, d, e, f, g
- Designated: 25 May 2001
- Reference no.: 1491
- Type: Cemetery/Graveyard/Burial Ground
- Category: Cemeteries and Burial Sites

The Gore Hill Memorial Cemetery is a heritage-listed cemetery located on the Pacific Highway in St Leonards, Sydney, Australia. It was established on 19 May 1868 by the New South Wales politician, William Tunks, and is one of the oldest and most significant remaining cemeteries in metropolitan Sydney. The first interment was in 1877, and until its closure for burials in 1974, 14,456 burials took place. Most burials took place between 1900 and 1930. It is also known as the Gore Hill Cemetery. The cemetery is situated on Crown land and is managed by a not for profit community organisation, Northern Cemeteries, through a Board of Trustees. It was added to the New South Wales State Heritage Register on 25 May 2001.

There are 17 war graves of Commonwealth service personnel of World War I, registered and maintained by the Commonwealth War Graves Commission.

== History ==
=== Development, establishments and early operations ===
In 1864, William Tunks, prominent Parramatta businessman, who owned land in the North Shore area, was elected member for St Leonards in the Legislative Assembly of NSW. Tunks soon moved to North Sydney and began an interest in local affairs, in particular the establishment of a general cemetery in the area. In 1867 the Surveyor General instructed licensed surveyor Armstrong to confer with Tunks and examine locations for a general cemetery. A plan was submitted by Armstrong for a 14-acre area of Crown Land at Gore Hill, with burial areas for the religious denominations allocated in proportion to the total population. Areas were also allocated for a general cemetery, future extensions and a central road. The plan gained approval from the Minister for Lands despite some opposition by local residents. The following year Tunks sought protection for the site from the Secretary of Lands following repeated incidents of cutting and removal of timber. He expressed the opinion that a number of the existing trees "...ought to be left standing for the purpose of shade and ornamentation...". Subsequently, Willoughby Council agreed to protect the land pending the appointment of trustees.

The first part of the Cemetery was dedicated on 19 May 1868 and in 1870 The Borough Councils of St Leonards, East St Leonards and North Willoughby were appointed trustees of the cemetery. In 1871 the Borough of Victoria was appointed as the fourth trustee. It is likely that a cemetery committee was appointed around this time. Tunks was named as the chairman of the cemetery trust. A grant was received from Treasury for the erection of a four-rail pig-proof fence enclosing the site. In 1875 responsibility for Gore Hill Cemetery was transferred from the four boroughs to lay trustees of the authorities who had been allocated land. This resulted in the formation of seven separate and independent cemeteries sharing a common carriage way. In 1877 burials commenced and minor landscape works were carried out in some sections by individual trusts.

William Tunks died in 1883 and was buried at the entrance to the Church of England section, the first burial in this section. A monument was erected. In 1884 the first combined Committee of trustees was formed. The following year the Committee put forward plans to improve the cemetery grounds, build a caretaker's residence, make a 20-metre (66 ft) wide avenue, kerb and gutter, clear stumps and undergrowth, trench around the site to 16 feet, and plant evergreen shrubs. The NSW Department of Justice authorised the Trustees to build a caretaker's cottage on half an acre of the Extension Reserve, west of the Carriageway.

In 1886 the caretaker's cottage was constructed, the driveway cleared, and grounds cleared. James Kennedy was appointed caretaker by the Committee of Trustees with responsibilities including grave digging, planting trees, maintaining borders and weeding. Discussions took place on having the carriageway planted with an avenue of trees. A total of 56 burials were recorded to December 1886. In 1887 the Trustees received a Treasury grant to undertake improvements to the cemetery grounds, including planting, provision of seats and gates, trenching and asphalting. A sub-committee was formed to carry out the works. In 1890 a picket fence, 1.5-metre (5 ft) high, was erected and painted along the Lane Cove Road (now the Pacific Highway) boundary. Four years later the general section east of the carriageway was redesigned for extensions to the Wesleyan, Presbyterian and Congregational sections. By 1899 an estimated 2096 burials had been performed at Gore Hill Cemetery. Between 1898 and 1900 the carriageway was regraded and guttered, and a shelter shed erected and between 1900 and 1901 the Carriageway was surfaced with blue metal. Some monuments and remains from the Devonshire Street Cemetery, in use 1819 to 1901, were relocated to Gore Hill Cemetery at the time of construction of Central railway station. The remains were transferred before the redevelopment of Devonshire Street Cemetery in 1901.

=== 1902 to closure in 1974 ===
In 1902 iron gates with stone piers were erected at the main entrance on Lane Cove Road (now the Pacific Highway). The sandstone was from Waverley Quarry and the piers were constructed by W. E. Parry of Gordon. The iron work was by Mr George Wales of Clarence Street, Sydney. East of the Carriageway the General Section and Extension area were eliminated. The Jewish area was relocated. New burial areas for Roman Catholics and Unsectarians were allocated. Extensions were given to the Presbyterian, Wesleyan-Methodist and Independent areas. Trustees of the General Section became the Trustees of the Unsectarian Section.

West of the Carriageway, the Extension area was eliminated in 1903 to provide for extensions to the Church of England burial area and the establishment of a Baptist burial area. East of the Carriageway, the Roman Catholic, Methodist, Jewish and Unsectarian burial areas were redesigned. The present brick retaining walls along the Carriageway were erected by the Combined Committee of Trustees. A timber, Gothic style Robing Room and Chapel was erected in the new Church of England extension, near the Carriageway; it was destroyed by fire in 1975. The Dalton vault was erected in the first Roman Catholic Section.

In 1904 the Trustees were informed by the Department of Lands of the discontinuation of government subsidies for general maintenance and improvements. In 1906 the Trustees produced "Regulations for the Management of the Portions of the General Cemetery at Gore Hill" and in 1908 the portion of the Cemetery east of the Carriageway was revoked and re-dedicated for General Cemetery. In 1910 Mr Kennedy was succeeded as Sexton by Frederick Crowe. In 1917 east of the Carriageway, the Roman Catholic and Unsectarian areas were redesigned and the Jewish Area eliminated and in 1919 east of the Carriageway the Methodist and Presbyterian burial areas were redesigned to increase the Presbyterian area. Internal boundaries of burial areas were finalised. In 1922 the stone archway at the entrance to the Baptist Section was presented to the Trustees of that section by T. E. Rofe of Wahroonga. All burial plots were sold by this time. In 1926 a portion of the western boundary was claimed by the Main Roads Board for the widening of Lane Cove Road. The change did not encroach upon the burial areas of the Baptist, Church of England, and Roman Catholic Trusts.

A dividing fence between the public recreation area and the cemetery was erected in 1926 and two roods and 26 perches were taken from the Lane Cove Road boundary. The existing metal and wire fence was possibly erected at about this time, with the cost being borne by the relevant government authority. The Carriageway was resurfaced with tar and macadam in about 1930. The following year a new Code of Regulations was prepared and adopted by the Trustees. There is little information available about the cemetery for the Depression and World War II years. In 1948 two sandstone monuments to members of the Hordern family were transferred to Gore Hill Cemetery from St Stephen's, Newtown (Camperdown Cemetery) when the latter was converted to a Rest Park. In 1949 a new sexton's cottage was built at the southern end of the cemetery, adjoining the highway. By the 1950s burials had decreased, and in 1974 the cemetery ceased operating. To signify its closure and change of status from a working to a memorial cemetery, it was renamed the Gore Hill Memorial Cemetery. In 1965 a combined Trust was set up to carry out administration of the Cemetery. The following year the NSW Government passed Act No. 52, 1966, to provide for the care, control and management of cemeteries by municipal councils. However, the Act did not apply to Gore Hill. Willoughby Council expressed no interest in the acquisition of the Cemetery.

In 1967, due to concerns over funding arrangements for maintenance the Trustees proposed a future policy to the Minister for Lands that the Cemetery be converted to a botanical garden with significant monuments and vaults to be conserved and others removed. On 27 May 1971, a special meeting of Trustees heard a report from the Mayor of Willoughby on the Government's proposal to close Gore Hill Cemetery and convert it to a "rest park". The meeting resolved to accept the proposals. All Cemetery staff were dismissed on 12 November and no further maintenance was carried out. The Sexton, Mr Vandine, was permitted to remain in the cottage in a caretaker role.

The last burials in the Cemetery occurred early in 1974. On 24 April, the Minister for Lands informed the Trust that the Gore Hill Cemetery Bill 1974 would be enacted and the Cemetery closed to burials from the 18 May 1974. Under the Act the land was to be dedicated as a public park, with Willoughby Council as trustees who were required to "improve" the Cemetery as a rest park and garden. The Act also required Council to consider the views of the Royal Australian Historical Society with respect to the historical aspects of the Cemetery.

=== 1975 to 1989 ===
Concerns over the future of the cemetery and fears over its demolition resulted in a public meeting of protest being held in 1975. The meeting resolved to request Willoughby Council to rescind its motion adopting the "rest park" plan. It also resolved to form a group to be known as The Friends of Gore Hill Cemetery to work for the conservation of the Cemetery. In 1976 Willoughby Council requested the Minister for Lands to repeal the Gore Hill Act 1974. The Society of Australian Genealogists completed transcriptions of the inscriptions on all the monuments and Gore Hill Cemetery was Classified by the National Trust as an historic cemetery. The Heritage Bill was enacted in 1977, providing for the Heritage Council of New South Wales as the Government's advisory body on conservation of the State's environmental heritage. Established in 1978, the Heritage Council of New South Wales recognised Gore Hill Cemetery as an item of the State's environmental heritage, although no conservation order was made in respect of the site.

In 1979 The Heritage Council made available a grant of $35,000 for specific conservation works. The Department of Lands received a Treasury allocation of $50,000 for conservation works at the Cemetery, with an indication of further contributions of $50,000 over each of the next five years. A working committee was established in December comprising Department of Lands (convenor), Willoughby Municipal Council, and the Heritage Council. The Working Committee released a Discussion Paper in May 1981, and in July engaged consultant, Lesley Gulson to implement the conservation strategies outlined in the Paper, over a six-month period. In November the same year the Working Committee staged a public exhibition and associated lectures to seek comment on the strategies. Restoration work commenced on the Cemetery drainage system. By the end of 1981/82 membership of the Friends was 290.

The following year kerbing and guttering was laid along the Cemetery side of Westbourne Street. Between 1982 and 1984 the following projects were completed under the supervision of the Working Committee :

- Repair of fence along Pacific Highway boundary;
- Turfing of the Carriageway and extension of brick paving along western side;
- Restoration of the main gates at Pacific Highway end;
- Landscape improvements to the entrances at Pacific Hwy and Westbourne St;
- Restoration of the Lych Gate (grant of $2664 to Friends) and Shelter Shed;
- Removal of dead trees, replanting of shrubs, restoration of brickwork ($50,000 grant from Department of Lands) and clearing of paths. (Most of the new plantings and spray heads for watering system were stolen).
- Marker pegs installed to identify denominational sections.

In 1984 The NSW Minister for Planning and Environment approved land rezoning to permit Community and Commercial Use of the Sexton's Cottage site. Income from a proposed lease of the site would be used for maintenance and restoration of the Cemetery. A forty-year lease of the site was granted to the architectural firm, Edwards, Madigan, Torzillo, Briggs International Pty Ltd, with rent tied to CPI variations and reviewable every five years (the lease runs from 1 January 1985 to 31 December 2024). By the end of 1983/84 the Friends' membership was approximately 300. In 1985 Edith Sims' history of Gore Hill Cemetery was published by the Friends. In 1986 the Friends expressed concern at the lack of a gardener and the amount of overgrowth in the Cemetery. The Friends did the only maintenance for a number of years until a trust was formed. The Gore Hill Memorial Cemetery Act was assented to in 1986, repealing the Gore Hill Cemetery Act 1974. The Roman Catholic Robing Room ($17,000 grant to Friends) and the metal arbour beside the Carriageway were restored.

The National Trust of Australia (New South Wales) proposed that a Permanent Conservation Order be made over the Cemetery. In 1987 Trustees were appointed to manage the Cemetery in accordance with the new Act. Appointees were nominated by the Heritage Council, the National Trust, Willoughby, with Richard Mackay as Chairman. Municipal Council, Lane Cove Municipal Council and the Friends of Gore Hill Cemetery. The following year the Trust requested that a Permanent Conservation Order under the Heritage Act be made in respect of the Cemetery, but this request was not acted on. In 1989 Gore Hill Memorial Cemetery was featured in a light-hearted look at cemeteries on the TV lifestyle program "Burke's Backyard". Local State Member of Parliament, John Dowd presented the Trust with a cheque for funds remaining from the Crown Lands grant of 1985.

=== 1990 to date ===
In 1990 a grant from the National Estate Grants Program and a loan from the Crown Lands Office were made to enable major landscape conservation works to be carried out. Consultant horticulturalists carried out a program of rubbish removal, weeding, repair of damaged paths, clearing and repair of drains. The Department of Planning's "Heritage Conservation in Action" Education Kit was launched at Gore Hill Memorial Cemetery. Plumbing and bottled gas were connected to the gardener's shed/office. A Memorial Garden was established along part of the eastern side of the Carriageway for several placement of ashes, with fees to supplement Trust income. In 1991 dead palms were removed from the old Catholic section and tree surgery was performed on major trees.

One of the toilets was repaired, with a new door. Interpretive signs were erected on the shed/office. The boundary fence along the Pacific Highway were repaired. The Cemetery was featured in John Stowar's garden segment on the TV program "Good Morning Australia".

In 1992 Chris Betteridge assumed the role of Chairman of the Trust for a period of five years. The Trust received a grant of $7,500 for conservation of the Wilson and Skene vaults. The lessee of the Sexton's Cottage site sought an extension of the lease to 99 years but this was refused by the Minister for Lands. The Trust published a brochure promoting the placement of ashes and the annual care of graves. Venturer Scouts carried out a program of research and surveys for World Environment Day and Queen's Scout awards.

The five-year term of the first trustees expired. The Treasurer reported that the Trust's capital had been reduced by 50% in that time. In 1993 a new monument to David Gregory, Australia's first Test Cricket captain was unveiled and the Shed in the Methodist section of the Cemetery was restored.

In 1994 the Trust appointed a Coordinator to supervise contractors and Community Service workers and to coordinate gardening tasks. The Department of Conservation and Land Management provided a grant of $4,000. The Carroll Vault was repaired. In 1995 A monument was erected on the original burial site of Mother Mary MacKillop, commemorating her beatification. This monument was funded by Government grants and commercial and private donations. The Trust adopted a Visitor Code for the Cemetery.

The Trust again sought a Permanent Conservation Order over the Cemetery, to no avail. A State Government grant was obtained for the preparation of a Plan of Management. A large Sydney Blue Gum tree in the Church of England section came down in a severe storm on 25 September, smashing several monuments. The Plan of Management was prepared in 1996 and adopted by the Trust.

The third set of Trustees were appointed in 1997, with David Gray appointed Chairman. Since that time the Trust has been successful in obtaining further financial assistance to conserve the incinerator and the Cornwell vault. Funds have also been obtained for privet eradication and other landscape maintenance works. In 2000 the Trust mounted an exhibition at Willoughby Council to showcase the progress achieved in the 25 years since the Cemetery was closed to burials. New signs were erected at the corner of the Pacific Highway and Westbourne Street and at the southern entrance gates. The Friends continued their invaluable assistance with publication of further biographies of those buried at Gore Hill, and with a program of activities, including open days, guided walks, working bees and their annual Pilgrimage.

A proposal by Royal North Shore Hospital for new buildings adjacent to the eastern boundary posed a threat to the visual qualities of the cemetery and to mature vegetation growing along the boundary. A new plan of management prepared by Caroline Tallents of DEM to replace the 1996 plan by Chris Betteridge & David Beaver, will be put on public exhibition shortly. Gore Hill Memorial Cemetery is now under the administration of the Northern Metropolitan Cemeteries Trust, formed by the NSW State Government to combine the operations of Macquarie Park (North Ryde), Field of Mars (Ryde), Frenchs Forest (Davidson) and Gore Hill Cemetery (St Leonards). A new monument to commemorate the Sisters of Mercy has been erected in the Roman Catholic section which lists the names of the 115 sisters who were buried here from 1916 to 1963. This is in addition to the monument in the Old Roman Catholic Section which lists the names of the 49 sisters buried there from 1886 to 1963. The Sisters of Mercy, North Sydney established a presence in Sydney at Church Hill in 1865. Led by Mother Mary Ignatius McQuoin they established their convent and a school for girls which became Monte Sant' Angelo in Miller Street, North Sydney.

Gore Hill Memorial Cemetery had been administered by the Gore Hill Memorial Cemetery Trust until 29 June 2012 when the Northern Metropolitan Cemeteries Trust took over the administration.

== Description ==
Gore Hill Memorial Cemetery is located adjacent to the Pacific Highway, just north of St Leonards and approximately six kilometres north of the Sydney CBD. The Cemetery is divided into two major spaces by the central Carriageway. Further spaces are created by hedge plantings between denominational sections, particularly between the old Roman Catholic and Church of England sections. The landscape character is one of enclosed space, defined by dense evergreen tree plantings along the Cemetery boundaries and down either side of the Carriageway. Rows of mature palms along the main pathways are a distinctive landscape feature of the western portion of the Cemetery. Historic photographic evidence suggests that the major internal spaces were largely devoid of trees. However, in the last twenty or thirty years reduced levels of maintenance have resulted in considerable overgrowth. Recent management policy has been to remove woody self-sown plants but the landscape is still more heavily vegetated than in the past.

The layout of the paths on a grid pattern enabled the creation of focal points at a number of intersections. Most prominent of these in the western part of the Cemetery are the octagonal Jesuit plot in the Old Catholic section, and the circular Hordern plot in the Church of England section. In the eastern part, the most prominent focal point is the Catholic Robing Room. The older sections, particularly on the western side of the Cemetery, are characterised by a concentration of grand monuments and vaults, featuring a variety of materials and designs. By contrast the low-lying Baptist section is more uniform in character, with simpler layout and monuments. The architectural design studio, built on the site of the former Sexton's Cottage, is of distinctive modern design, but has been landscaped to minimise its visual impact on the Cemetery. The cemetery contains a number of buildings associated with its use as a burial place. In addition, on the site of the former Sexton's Cottage, there is a modern building, designed as a studio and offices for a firm of architects who have a long-term lease on that part of the site.

Buildings in the Cemetery are

- The Lich Gate, at the entrance to the Old Roman Catholic section, close to the Carriageway. This structure served as a place where the funeral party traditionally stopped and rested the coffin while they waited for the priest to arrive. It has a brick base, with timber posts supporting a gabled roof, clad with shingles. The Lich Gate was restored in 1983, only to be damaged soon afterwards by a truck associated with a film crew shooting a picture in the Cemetery. The damage was repaired with insurance funds provided by the film company. The Lich Gate is in good condition and is used by visitors as a shelter (it has seats on either side of the central path) particularly by the Friends during their regular working bees and annual pilgrimage.
- The Shelter Shed, in the Methodist section, adjacent to the Carriageway, is a timber framed and clad building approximately 4 metres long and 2.5 metres wide. It has lattice panels either side of the north facing opening with a shingle clad awning. The gabled roof is clad with Marseilles pattern tiles and has decorative timber barge boards. The interior features benches on three sides, an internal lining of ripple iron and tessellated tile floor. The shed was erected c. 1900 to provide shelter for Cemetery visitors and at that time featured a stained glass window in its southern elevation and displayed Cemetery notices on its western exterior wall. The building has undergone staged repairs in recent years and is in generally good condition.
- The Catholic Robing Room, was built around the turn of the Century and served as a changing room for priests attending funerals. It is built in the Arts and Crafts style, of masonry construction with rough cast render applied to the exterior walls and is painted cream. The pyramidal roof is clad in timber shingles and capped with a copper-clad cross. Two black slate steps lead into an in situ terrazzo floor, the centre of which is decorated with a black wreath pattern. The interior features two large wardrobes / cupboards built in to the western corners. Casement windows on three sides are shuttered with timber louvred screens. The building is approximately 5 metres square and is in good condition. The robing room is used for meetings by the Friends and the Trust during the summer months when there is sufficient ambient light available. It is in good condition.
- The Methodist Workers Shed, is a very simple utilitarian structure with brick walls and a Marseilles pattern tiled roof. It is 3.5 metres long and 2.5 metres wide. This building has been restored recently, is in good condition and is used for storage.
- The Site Office/Storage Shed, located between the Carriageway and Gore Hill Park consists of two parts, a timber framed, weatherboard clad shed with a more recent brick annexe, the latter at a lower level and containing a shower recess and storage area. The overall size of the building is approximately 5.5 metres long and 2 metres deep. The whole building is painted Mid Brunswick Green to reduce its visual impact. The brick part is of a style inconsistent with other structures and the timber section, apart from the floor boards, is in very poor condition as a result of termite attack.
- The Toilets, located near the southern end of the Carriageway adjoining Gore Hill Park, are simple, brick structures, approximately one metre square, with gabled roofs clad with tiles. One has been restored and contains a single water closet. The other is in a ruinous state.
- The Incinerator, located on the western side of the Carriageway in the Baptist Section, is a brick structure approximately 2 metres wide and 3 metres deep with concrete cover to the fire box and a tall brick chimney. The structure has been vandalised in recent times and requires stabilisation and repointing to render its safe.

The Cemetery contains a wealth of funerary monuments exhibiting a wide range of styles and construction materials. The greatest number of burials date from the period 1900 to 1930, and are modest memorials. There are also many earlier monuments which are excellent examples of craftsmanship and religious symbolism. Included among the memorials are plots containing the remains of members of religious orders, such as Jesuit Priests and the Sisters of St Joseph. A number of family vaults are located in various parts of the cemetery.

Marble, sandstone, granite, trachyte and brick are the main materials used for monuments in the Cemetery and some have cast or wrought iron surrounds. The dramatic landscape of funerary architecture, particularly in the older sections of the Cemetery is dominated by elaborate crosses, pillars, and sculptures. Common monument types from the late 19th and early 20th Centuries found in the Cemetery include:

- Calvary and Celtic crosses
- Pedestals
- Obelisks
- Columns / Broken columns
- Urns / Draped urns
- Angels
- Composite – angel and cross

Since the end of World War I there has been a trend towards more modest "slab and desk" type monuments.

The Cemetery is divided into two main areas by a central avenue, historically known as The Carriageway, which runs from Westbourne Street in the north to the Pacific Highway in the south. Originally gravel, the Carriageway was surfaced with blue metal in 1901 and then bitumen in 1930. A length along the boundary with the old Roman Catholic and Church of England sections was paved in brick. By the late 1970s the condition of the bitumen paving had deteriorated considerably and a decision was taken by the Gore Hill Cemetery Steering Committee to remove the bitumen and resurface the Carriageway with turf. At the same time, the brick paving along the western side was extended along the entire length to facilitate movement of motor vehicles (e.g. trucks for garbage collection) and to provide a hard surface exit into the Gore Hill Oval carpark. The Carriageway is edged with deep, brick-lined drains, and has low brick walls along much of its length. Condition of the turf varies with season but the condition of the grassed and paved sections of the Carriageway is generally good.

Denominational sections within the Cemetery are served by a gridwork of brick-paved paths which provide access to the burial plots and the means of movement throughout the Cemetery. It is likely that the bricks used for paving in the Cemetery were produced in the brickworks that adjoined the site during the early twentieth century. The paths vary in width, but are mostly around one metre wide. Condition varies but management has made a point of keeping the paths cleared of weed growth and sediment buildup to allow reasonable public access to all parts of the site. There are a number of bench-type seats, dating from the 1980s, at various locations in the Cemetery, mostly on brick-paved areas adjacent to the Carriageway.

The northern boundary, with Westbourne Street, is fenced with a steel post and chain-wire mesh fence erected in the 1980s to control public access and intrusion of motor vehicles into the Cemetery from Westbourne Street which is used heavily by students at the TAFE College and by visitors to Royal North Shore Hospital. The northern entry to the Carriageway is controlled by a lockable steel chain strung between timber posts, with a removable central timber bollard.

The western boundary, along the Pacific Highway, from the corner of Westbourne Street, to the corner of Gore Hill Park, is fenced with a steel fence, comprising tubular steel posts with decorative finial caps and intervening panels of chain-wire mesh supported on tubular steel; frames. The panels are surmounted by decorative serrated cappings of cast iron. This fence has been damaged in places from time to time by motor vehicles losing control on the Highway and crashing into the fence or by vandals removing panels to gain access to the Cemetery. Management, including the Trust, have made every effort to keep this perimeter fence in good order and its condition is generally good. Many of the decorative cappings and post finials have been lost over the years.

The southern end of the Carriageway is controlled by a pair of wrought iron vehicular gates, supported on massive sandstone posts, with pedestrian gates either side. These gates, erected in 1902, were conserved in the 1980s and are in generally good condition. The vehicular gates are kept locked for security reasons and to prevent vehicular egress onto the Highway at a dangerous spot on a curve with poor lines of sight. The eastern boundary, with the Royal North Shore Hospital and Gore Hill Park, and part of the southern boundary, with Gore Hill Park, are unfenced.

The Carriageway has low brick walls constructed along much of its length. These date from 1903 and were restored during the 1980s. Other structures include a steel arbour over a path into the Congregational section, a stone arch into the Baptist section, and the incinerator at the north eastern corner of the Baptist section.

The vegetation of Gore Hill Cemetery comprises original plantings of ornamental species, self-sown plants derived from these over the years, invasive weeds, and remnants of indigenous vegetation, also with self-sown offspring. As with many historic cemeteries, the original ornamental plantings at Gore Hill Cemetery were evergreen species of trees and shrubs, many with symbolic meanings associated with religious beliefs such as everlasting life, victory over death, undying love, eternal friendship, mourning and remembrance.

=== Condition ===
As at 19 February 2001, the cemetery is maintained in a state of "controlled overgrowth", a management regime in which paths are kept clear, invasive woody weeds are controlled, all buildings are maintained, some graves are maintained under care agreements.

I recently (July) put in a proposal re a new maintenance contract for the cemetery so I have visited it and have a copy of the Management Plan. From my inspection, I could see that a (the?) major problem is with self-seeded trees & shrubs such as Brush Box, Privet, Wild Olive and Raphiolepis growing in the grave plots and pathways, the seedlings not having been removed when small in the past by maintenance contractors. The now-large trees and shrubs are breaking up the graves, headstones, edging and making the paving uneven and dangerous to walk on in places.

Many other weeds grow in the grave plots, only some of which are controlled on some grave to an extent by whipper snipping. Wisteria and Blackberries are rampant in some graves nearby areas and Asparagus Fern, Wild Olive and large-leafed Privet are taking hold in north and west boundary "plantings". I think weed control is actually a high priority. If boundary Privets & Wild Olives for example are removed, they can be replaced with new trees to "frame" the cemetery.

I was not awarded the maintenance contract but was informed that a temporary contract was being put in place and the situation would be reviewed in the coming year.

— Gina Plate, email to Stuart Read, 11 December 2011.

The Cemetery is largely intact, except for the loss of the Church of England Robing Room/Chapel (burned down 1975), the Sexton's Cottages (first demolished c.1949, second demolished 1984) and damage due to vandalism and natural decay.

=== Modifications and dates ===
- Caretaker's Residence constructed 1886.
- Picket fence 1.5-metre (5 ft) high erected along Lane Cove Road (now Pacific Highway) boundary 1890.
- General Section east of Carriageway redesigned 1894.
- Carriageway regraded and guttered 1898–1900.
- Carriageway surfaced with blue metal 1900–01.
- Some monuments from Devonshire Street (Sandhills) Cemetery relocated to Gore Hill 1900–01.
- Iron gates with stone piers erected at southern end of Cemetery 1902.
- Extensions to Church of England Section and creation of a Baptist Section 1903.
- Brick retaining walls constructed along Carriageway.
- New Sexton's Cottage built 1949.
- Cemetery closed to burials from 18 May 1974.
- Pacific Highway boundary fence repaired 1982–84.
- Turfing of Carriageway and extension of brick paving down western side of Carriageway 1982–84.
- Restoration of main gates at southern end of Cemetery 1982–84.
- Landscape improvements at both ends of Carriageway 1982–84.
- Restoration of Lych Gate and Shelter Shed 1982–84.
- Removal of dead trees, replanting of shrubs, restoration of brickwork and clearing of paths 1982–84.
- Marker pegs installed to identify denominational sections 1982–84.
- Architectural design studio and offices for Edwards Madigan Torzillo Briggs built on site of former Sexton's Cottage 1984.
- Major program of rubbish removal, weeding, repair of damaged paths and clearing of blocked drains 1990.
- Plumbing and bottled gas connected to Gardener's Shed 1990.
- Memorial garden established along eastern side of Carriageway wall 1991.
- Dead palms removed from old Catholic section and tree surgery on several major trees 1991.
- One of toilets repaired, with new door 1991.
- Interpretive signs erected at Gardener's Shed/Office 1991.
- Boundary fence along Pacific Highway repaired 1991.
- Wilson and Skene vaults conserved 1992.
- Monument to David Gregory, Australia's first test cricket captain erected 1993.
- Methodist Shed restored 1993.
- Carroll Vault repaired 1994.
- Monument erected on original burial site of Mother Mary MacKillop 1995.
- Incinerator repaired 1996.
- New signs erected at each end of the Cemetery 2000.
- Cornwell Vault conserved 2000.

== Notable interments ==
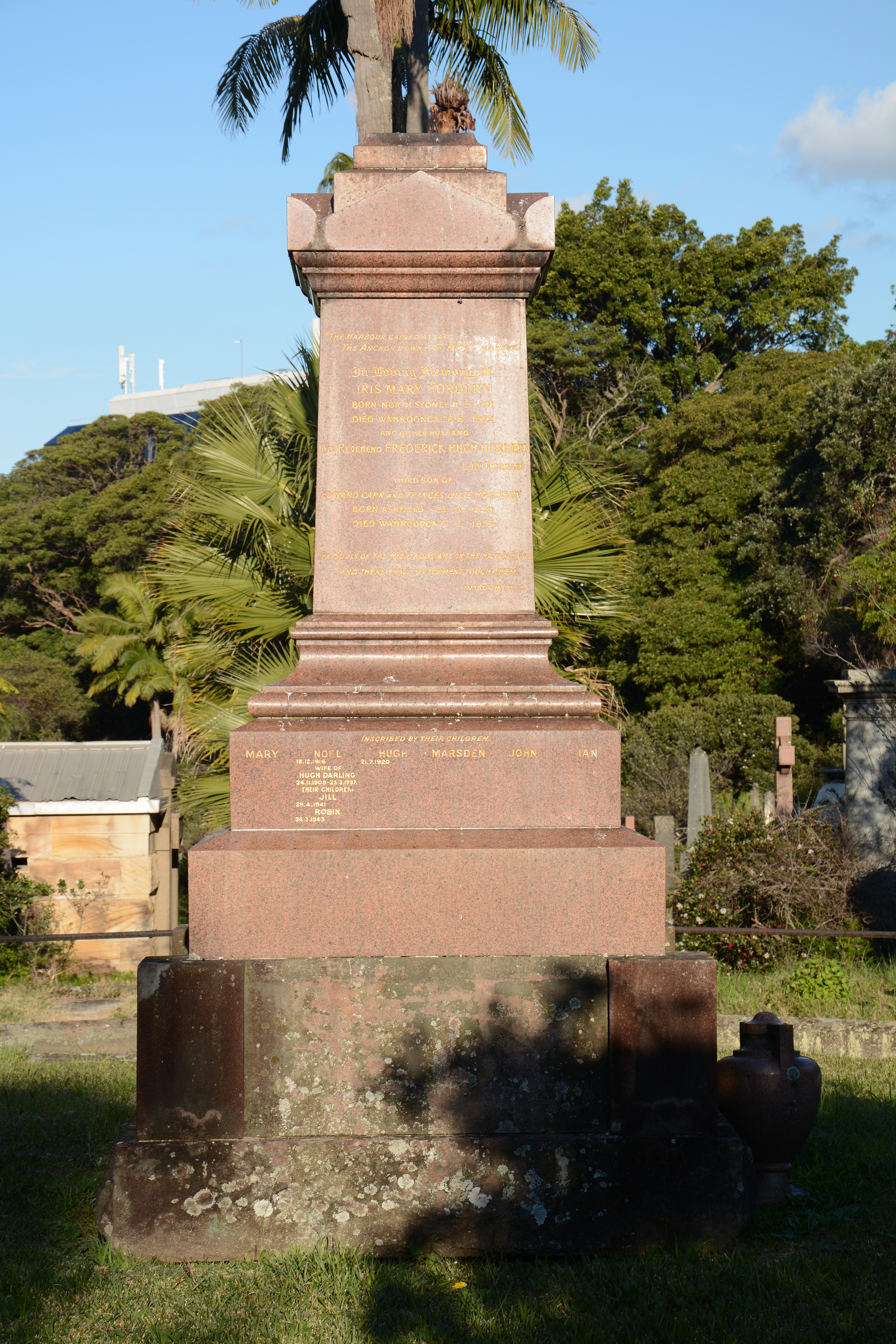
Hordern family grave in the Church of England section.

- William Anderson (1846–1930), 12th Mayor of North Sydney (1914-1918).
- Gerald Joseph Barry (1846–1931), 5th Mayor of North Sydney (1894–1897).
- George Alexander Chambers (1877–1963), Bishop of Central Tanganyika (1926–1946) and founder of Trinity Grammar School.
- Charles Upfold (1834–1919), proprietor of Australia's largest soap and candle manufacturers.
- Alfred Conroy (1864–1920), Member of the Australian Parliament for Werriwa (1901–1906, 1913–1914).
- James John Glover JP (1843–1918), Alderman (1899–1917) and Mayor of the Municipality of Mosman (1904–1905, 1909–1910).
- Henry Green (d. 1925), builder and 14th Mayor of North Sydney.
- Dave Gregory (1845–1919), first test captain of Australian cricket team in 1877.
- Diedrich Henne (1834–1913), botanical collector.
- Hordern family, several members.
- Benard Kieran (1886–1905), world champion swimmer.
- Saint Mary MacKillop (1842–1909), was first interred here from 1909 to 1914 when her remains were moved to a specially-built chapel in North Sydney.
- John Charles Maynard (1835–1906), Chief Inspector and Under-Secretary of the NSW Department of Public Instruction (1885–1903), monument erected "by the officers and teachers of the department in commemoration of faithful public service."
- Charles Edward Robertson Murray (1843–1923) District court judge (1875–1916), jurist and Royal Commissioner.
- Maurice O'Shea (1897–1956), prominent winemaker and vigneron.
- Gerard Phillips (d. 1892), sixth Mayor of St Leonards (1890), second Mayor of North Sydney (Feb–May 1892).
- Francis Punch (1851–1917), fifth Mayor of St Leonards (1889–1890), first Mayor of North Sydney (1890–1892).
- Frederick George Sargood (1861–1932) eldest son of Frederick Thomas Sargood, governing director of Sargood Gardiner and director of the Royal Alexandra Hospital for Children.
- Evelyn Strang (1867-1954), President, Australian Woman's Christian Temperance Union
- Sir John Sulman (1849–1934), prominent architect and chairman of the Federal Capital Advisory Committee.
- Dugald Thomson (1848–1922), politician, member of NSW Parliament for Warringah (1894–1901) and member of the first Australian Parliament for North Sydney (1901–1910).
- William Tunks (1816–1883), first mayor of St Leonards, Member of Parliament for St Leonards and founder of Gore Hill Cemetery.
- Walter Liberty Vernon (1846–1914), New South Wales Government Architect (1890–1911).
- Hugh Venables Vernon (1877–1935), son of above, prominent soldier and architect, also noted involvement with RSL.
- Charles Alexander Walker (d. 1913), 11th Mayor of North Sydney (1912–1913).
- William Wardell (1823–1899), civil engineer and architect noted for designing St Patrick's Cathedral, Melbourne, Government House, Melbourne, St John's College, University of Sydney and St Mary's Cathedral, Sydney.
- Dr. James Eli Webb (1887–1939), member of NSW Parliament for Hurstville (1932–1939).
- James Robert Wilshire (1809–1860), third mayor of Sydney, Member of Parliament for Sydney City (monument transferred here in 1901 from the former Devonshire Street Cemetery).
- James Thompson Wilshire (1837–1909), son of above, mayor of Burwood, Member of Parliament for Canterbury (monument transferred here in 1901 from the former Devonshire Street Cemetery).
- Harrie Wood (1831–1917), civil servant and miner, appointed NSW under-secretary of mines in 1874 and later Agriculture and Justice.
- Harrie Dalrymple Wood CMG (1867–1937), son of above, civil servant, rugby union player and administrator, and Prothonotary of the NSW Supreme Court (1932–1936).
- George Gershon Mocatta (Australian Pastoralist and Merchant) (1815–1893), First man to overland cattle from NSW to QLD, taking 12 weeks.

== Heritage listing ==
As at 19 February 2001, Gore Hill Memorial Cemetery was an item of State heritage significance that satisfies all seven criteria for such listing. By virtue of its design and historical associations it is an important place in the pattern of the cultural history of NSW. In its layout, monuments and plants it demonstrates the religious philosophies and changing attitudes to death and its commemoration by a significant sample of the Australian population over a period of more than 100 years. Aesthetically the Cemetery is of rare and representative State significance as a particularly fine and intact example of a Late Victorian/Edwardian landscaped public burial ground with landmark qualities, important plantings and a wealth of high quality funerary architecture demonstrating the skills of the artisans who crafted the monuments. The Cemetery is of rare and representative social significance at a State level because of the unusually high esteem in which it is held by major identifiable groups in the community, a fact which led to its becoming a benchmark in the conservation of historic cemeteries through its saving from conversion and its dedication as a Memorial Cemetery.

Gore Hill Memorial Cemetery has enormous educational and research potential at a rare and representative State level by virtue of its wealth of genealogical, architectural, horticultural and artistic information which is readily accessible to Australia's major population centre (Criteria a and b). As the burial place for more than 14,000 people whose lives contributed to and enriched the history and development of Sydney's North Shore, Gore Hill Memorial Cemetery has strong and special associations with the community of a significant region of the State for social, cultural and spiritual reasons (Criterion d). As a particularly fine and intact example of a Late Victorian/Edwardian landscaped public burial ground with landmark qualities, important plantings and a wealth of high quality funerary architecture demonstrating the skills of the artisans who crafted the monuments, Gore Hill Memorial Cemetery demonstrates aesthetic characteristics and a high degree of creative achievement (Criterion c).

The Cemetery is held in unusually high esteem by major identifiable groups in the community, a fact which led to its becoming a benchmark in the conservation of historic cemeteries through its saving from conversion and its dedication as a Memorial Cemetery. This adds to its social significance (Criterion d). Gore Hill Memorial Cemetery has enormous potential to yield information that will contribute to an understanding of the cultural history of NSW by virtue of its wealth of genealogical, architectural, horticultural and artistic information which is readily accessible to Australia's major population centre. (Criterion e). Gore Hill Memorial Cemetery possesses rare aspects of NSW's cultural history through its landscape design and intactness (Criterion f) and demonstrates the principal characteristics of a class of the State's cultural places i.e. landscaped public burial grounds of the late 19th and early 20th centuries. (Criterion g).

Gore Hill Memorial Cemetery was listed on the New South Wales State Heritage Register on 25 May 2001 having satisfied the following criteria.

The place is important in demonstrating the course, or pattern, of cultural or natural history in New South Wales.

Gore Hill Memorial Cemetery is of representative and rare historical significance at a State level as the burial place for more than 14,000 people whose lives contributed to and enriched the history and development of a significant region of New South Wales. In its layout, monuments and plants it demonstrates the religious philosophies and changing attitudes to death and its commemoration by a significant sample of the Australian population over a period of more than 100 years. Many significant events are associated with the history of Gore Hill Memorial Cemetery, including burials of famous Australians, the memorial to Mother Mary MacKillop, Australia's first candidate for Sainthood in the Roman Catholic faith, and the dedication of the Cemetery as a Memorial Cemetery, an important event in the history of heritage conservation in New South Wales. Of particular interest at Gore Hill Memorial Cemetery are the graves of or memorials to the following :

Mother Mary MacKillop, Australia's first and only candidate for Sainthood in the Roman Catholic faith. Her remains have been removed from the Cemetery but she is commemorated by a monument erected in the plot where other members of her order are still buried. This memorial was dedicated at a special service held in 1995. William Tunks MLA, a prominent businessman, first Mayor of St Leonards and State Member for St Leonards, who was instrumental in having land set aside for a public cemetery at Gore Hill. His was the first Church of England burial in the Cemetery. Barney Kieran, Australia's international swimming champion, who died of appendicitis, aged nineteen, in 1905. Some 30,000 people attended his funeral which was described at the time "as one of the most remarkable mass funerals Australia has seen".

Sir John Sulman, noted architect, after whom the Sulman Prize for Architecture, is named. David William Gregory, who led Australia to the momentous first cricket Test victory against the English at the Melbourne Cricket Ground in March 1877. Until recently, Gregory's grave was unmarked but has now been given the recognition it deserves with a memorial paid for by supporters of the game.

The place is important in demonstrating aesthetic characteristics and/or a high degree of creative or technical achievement in New South Wales.

Aesthetically the Cemetery is of rare and representative State significance as a particularly fine and intact example of a Late Victorian/Edwardian landscaped public burial ground with landmark qualities, important plantings and a wealth of high quality funerary architecture demonstrating the skills of the artisans who crafted the monuments.

The place has a strong or special association with a particular community or cultural group in New South Wales for social, cultural or spiritual reasons.

The Cemetery is of rare and representative social significance at a State level because of the unusually high esteem in which it is held by major identifiable groups in the community, a fact which led to its becoming a benchmark in the conservation of historic cemeteries through its saving from conversion and its dedication as a Memorial Cemetery.

The place has potential to yield information that will contribute to an understanding of the cultural or natural history of New South Wales.

Gore Hill Memorial Cemetery has enormous educational and research potential at a rare and representative State level by virtue of its wealth of genealogical, architectural, horticultural and artistic information which is readily accessible to Australia's major population centre.

The place possesses uncommon, rare or endangered aspects of the cultural or natural history of New South Wales.

Every cemetery is unique for it contains the human remains of a particular person, family or community. Some cemeteries share similar layouts and monumental styles but Gore Hill Cemetery has a distinctive landscape character which sets it apart from other general cemeteries of its age and size.

The place is important in demonstrating the principal characteristics of a class of cultural or natural places/environments in New South Wales.

Gore Hill Memorial Cemetery is important in demonstrating the principal characteristics of a landscaped Late Victorian / Edwardian public cemetery, reflected in its denominational layout, symbolic ornamental plantings and funerary monumentation.

== See also ==
- Devonshire Street Cemetery
