= St Thomas Rest Park =

Cemetery in North Shore, Sydney, Australia

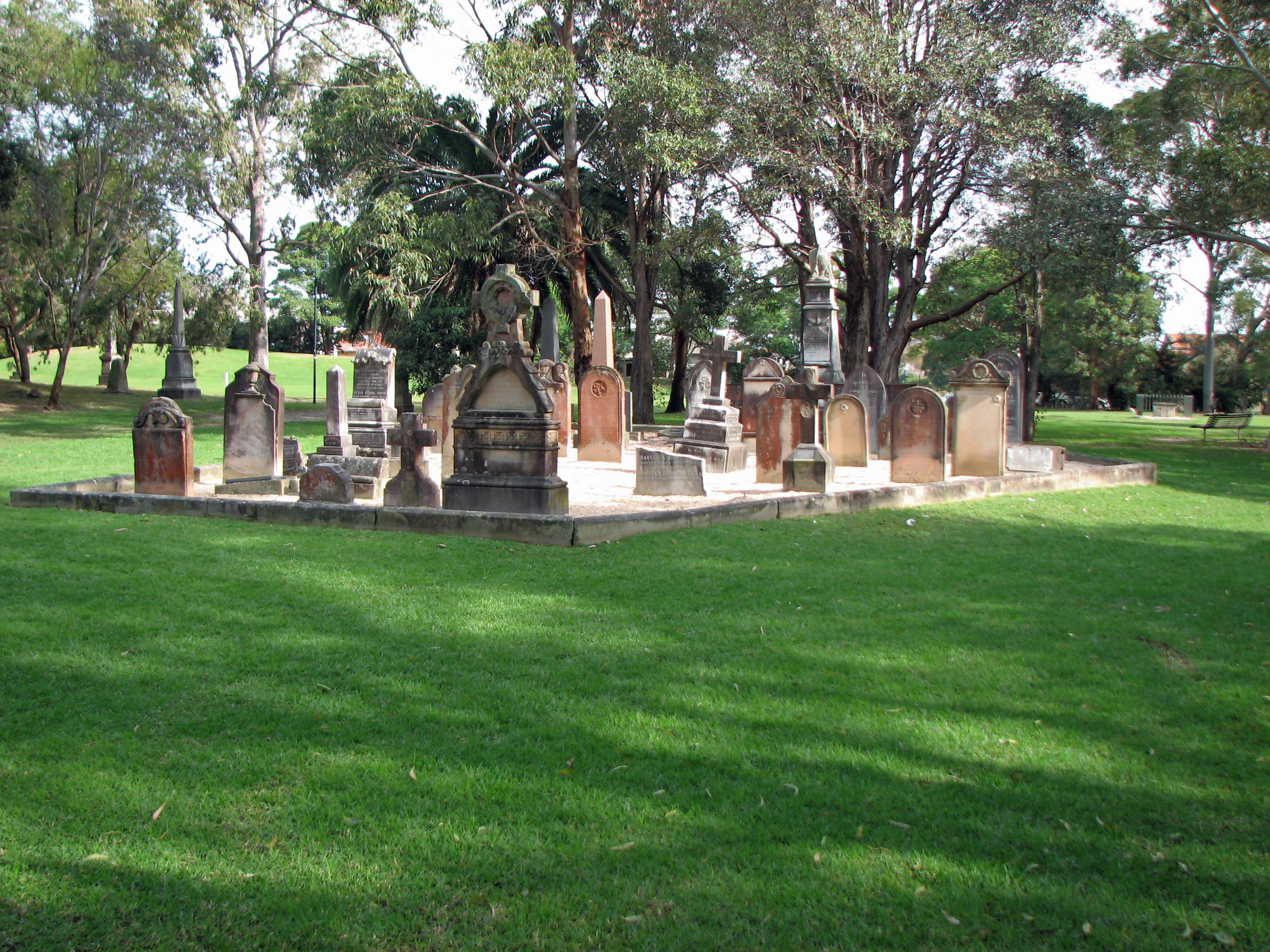
- Headstones and monuments in St Thomas' Rest Park
- Interactive map of St Thomas Rest Park

Details
- Established: 1845 (as a cemetery)
- Location: West Street, Crows Nest, Lower North Shore, Sydney, New South Wales
- Country: Australia
- Type: Historic cemetery and urban park
- Coordinates: 33°49′26″S 151°12′26″E
- Created: 1974 (as a park)
- Operator: North Sydney Council (since 1967)
- Open: Open all hours
- Website: www.northsydney.nsw.gov.au/Recreation_Facilities/Parks_Reserves/Search_Parks/St_Thomas_Rest_Park

St Thomas Rest Park, located in West Street, Crows Nest, New South Wales, Australia, is the site of the first cemetery on Sydney's North Shore. It is the largest park in the densely populated Crows Nest area.

== Cemetery ==
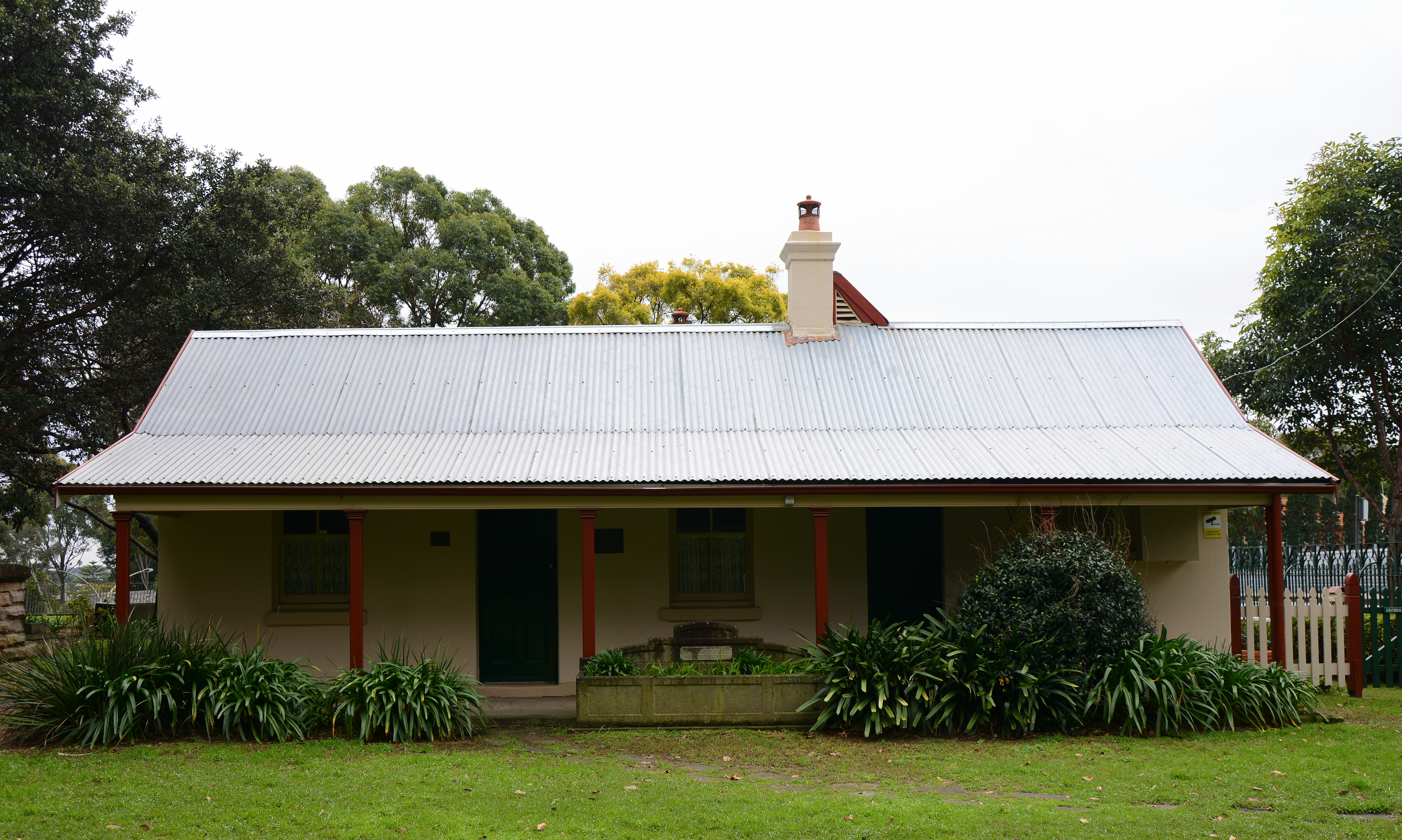
Sexton's Cottage Museum

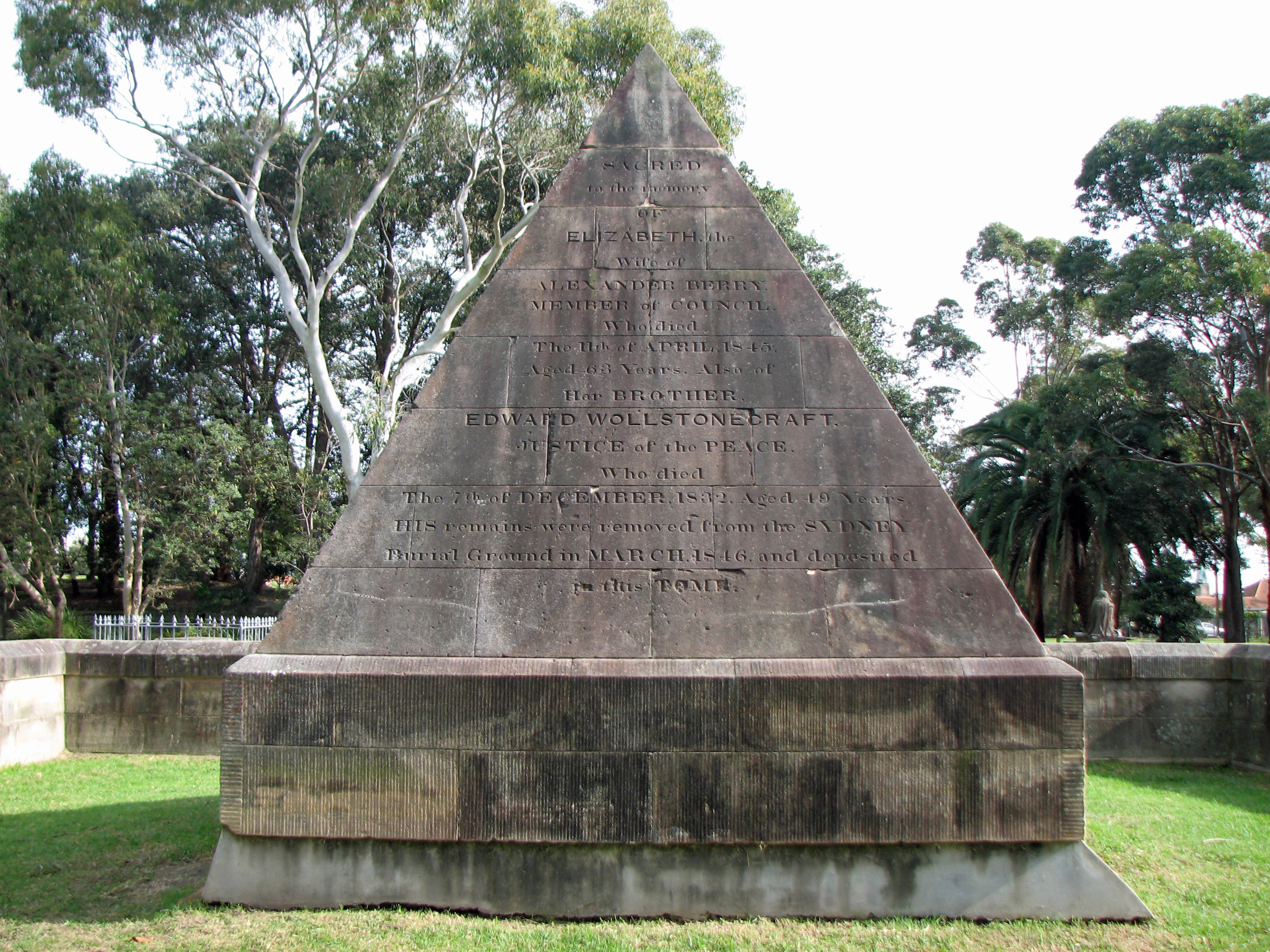
Tomb of Alexander Berry and his wife Elizabeth, plus Elizabeth's brother, Edward Wollstonecraft

The land that now contains the St Thomas' cemetery site was granted, in 1821, to Edward Wollstonecraft. The land for the cemetery was donated to the Anglican Parish of St Leonards in 1845 by the prominent landowner and merchant, Alexander Berry, whose wife Elizabeth had inherited it on the death of her brother Edward Wollstonecraft.

Wollstonecraft had died in 1832 and was buried in the Devonshire Street Cemetery. His remains were later moved to a tomb constructed in the St Thomas' Cemetery by Alexander Berry for his wife. Berry was also later entombed there. The tomb is still standing in the grounds of the Rest Park.

In 1967 the Cemetery was handed over to North Sydney Council by an Act of Parliament granting the area as 'community land' and allowing its conversion from a cemetery into a Rest Park. The new park opened in 1974. The sexton's cottage, dating from around 1850, was restored and opened as a museum in 1985. Many monuments and headstones are located within the sandstone-edged historic precincts while others are scattered around the Rest Park. An interpretive history trail provides 24-hour access to historical information.

The cemetery contains one Commonwealth war grave, of an Australian Army officer, Capt. Richard Gordon Dibbs. The Park contains the headstones of thirteen members of four generations of the Dibbs family, the oldest being Sophia Elizabeth Dibbs, born in Sydney in 1809, and mother of George Dibbs (grandson of George Dibbs, below) of World War II.

== Notable people buried in St Thomas' cemetery ==
- Robert Palmer Abbott, colonial politician and 5th Mayor of East St Leonards
- Charles Badham, classical philologist
- George Barney, Royal Engineers officer, Lieutenant Governor of the Colony of North Australia, Surveyor-General of New South Wales
- Ellis Bent, colonial judge-advocate
- Alexander Berry and wife Elizabeth
- Barcroft Henry Boake, poet, and his father Barcroft Capel Boake, photographer
- George Meares Countess Bowen, military officer and early colonial settler, and others in his family
- Matthew Charlton, 1st Mayor of the Borough of Victoria
- Rev. W.B. Clarke, rector of St Thomas church and "Father of Australian Geology"
- Thomas John Cook, 2nd Mayor of the Borough of Victoria
- George Dibbs, premier of New South Wales in the late 1800s, prior to Federation
- William Dind, hotelier, theatrical manager and 3rd Mayor of East St Leonards
- James Graham Goodenough, naval commander
- Hovenden Hely, explorer and politician
- Bernhardt Holtermann, gold miner, businessman, and politician
- Isaac Ellis Ives, 39th Mayor of Sydney, 3rd Mayor of the Borough of Victoria, MP for St Leonards
- Benjamin Jenkins, sea captain, owner of Don Bank, and 4th Mayor of St Leonards
- Peter Kempermann, German diplomat and consul-general in Sydney
- Edward Lord, son of Simeon Lord, City of Sydney Treasurer, 2nd Mayor of East St Leonards
- John Frederick Mann, explorer, member of Leichhardt's first expedition
- James Milson, pioneer, landowner and namesake of Milsons Point
- Alfred George Milson, grandson of James Milson, 10th Mayor of North Sydney
- Conrad Martens, artist
- Robert Moodie, 5th Mayor of the Borough of Victoria
- Joseph Musgrave, bowler and 2nd Mayor of St Leonards
- John Ovens, explorer
- William Tucker, 1st Mayor of East St Leonards
- William Waterhouse, 7th Mayor of the Borough of Victoria
- John Whitton, railway pioneer
- Edward Wollstonecraft, pioneer
- Montague Younger, musician

== See also ==
- List of cemeteries in Sydney
- List of parks in Sydney
