= Francis Punch =

Australian engineer, rower, hotel proprietor and local government politician

Francis Punch JP

1st Mayor of North Sydney
- In office 8 August 1890 – 10 February 1892
- Preceded by: Position established
- Succeeded by: Gerard Phillips

5th Mayor of St Leonards
- In office 15 February 1889 – 12 February 1890
- Preceded by: Benjamin Jenkins
- Succeeded by: Gerard Phillips
- In office 24 June 1890 – 29 July 1890
- Preceded by: Gerard Phillips
- Succeeded by: Council abolished

Alderman of the Borough of St Leonards for Albert Ward
- In office 4 February 1887 – 29 July 1890

Alderman of the Borough of Victoria
- In office 8 February 1886 – 11 February 1889

Alderman of the Municipality of North Sydney
- In office 29 July 1890 – 31 July 1894
- Succeeded by: Joseph Fogg
- Constituency: Tunks Ward (1892–94)
- In office 10 February 1896 – 13 February 1899
- Succeeded by: John Robert Hardie
- Constituency: Tunks Ward

Personal details
- Born: 20 December 1852 Sydney, Colony of New South Wales
- Died: 23 February 1917 (aged 64) North Sydney, New South Wales, Australia
- Resting place: Gore Hill Cemetery
- Party: Protectionist Party
- Spouse: Sarah Mooney (m.1876, d.1932)
- Children: Francis Stephen Punch; James Wallace Punch; Austin Punch; Mary Frances Conrick; Helen Guthrie Laing

Francis Michael Punch JP (20 December 1852 – 23 February 1917) was an Australian engineer, rower, hotel proprietor, and local government politician who served as the first Mayor of the Borough of North Sydney and the final Mayor of the Borough of St Leonards.

== Early life and career ==
Punch was born in Sydney in the Colony of New South Wales in 1852 and was educated at St Mary's School including at its location at Lyndhurst in Glebe. After serving his articles as an engineer, in 1872 Punch traveled to Great Britain in order to gain knowledge of marine engineering and to visit shipyards. However, on his return to Sydney, Punch ceased work as an engineer and went into private business as a rent collector and hotel proprietor. On 25 November 1876 he married Sarah Mooney.

Punch visited England and America in 1881, and on these visits he gained "a considerable amount of information ... as to the working of municipal institutions, and on his return to this colony he resolved to turn this experience to practical account." Punch was the younger brother of sculler, publican and promoter, James 'Jem' Punch, and was a sculler himself, standing as coxswain for his brother James and Thomas McGrath in their last race together. On his brother's death in 1881 Punch took over as proprietor of his hotel, 'The Corner', on the corner of Pitt and King Streets, Sydney. That same year Punch sponsored a sculling prize, known as the Frank Punch Trophy. In 1887, having settled into the St Leonards district of Sydney's lower north shore, Punch commissioned a grand new Italianate residence on Ridge Street, which he named St Helens.

== Political career ==
In February 1886, Punch was elected as an Alderman for the Borough of Victoria. A year later in February 1887, Punch was also elected as an Alderman for Albert Ward of the Borough of St Leonards. On 15 February 1889 he was elected Mayor of St Leonards for a single term. As mayor Punch was heavily involved in the efforts to amalgamate the three boroughs on the northern side of the harbour into a single council area.

When his successor as mayor, Gerard Phillips, resigned on 24 June 1890, Punch became mayor again but served only briefly before the Borough was amalgamated with the boroughs of Victoria and East St Leonards. The Boroughs of St Leonards, East St Leonards and Victoria formally amalgamated on 29 July 1890 and the first council met on 8 August 1890, with Punch being elected as the first mayor of the Borough of North Sydney. He was re-elected to a second term unanimously in February 1891.

Building on his prominence in the community as mayor and a leader in the amalgamation process, Punch stood as the Protectionist Party candidate for the New South Wales Legislative Assembly three-member seat of St Leonards at the 1891 election, declaring his position as a federationist and that he "would be proud to follow in the footsteps of Mr. E. Barton". He was unsuccessful, two of the three seats being won by the Free Trade Party and the final seat taken by the new Labour Electoral League.

Punch stood again as the Protectionist Party candidate for the now single-member seat of St Leonards at the next election in July 1894 but was again unsuccessful, being defeated by the Free Trade candidate Henry Parkes. On 31 July 1894, Punch announced his retirement as an alderman for Tunks Ward on North Sydney Council, and the council subsequently passed a resolution that "this council expresses its deep regret that Mr. Punch has decided to resign, and desires to place on record its appreciation of the many services rendered to the North Shore district and the borough by Mr. Punch during a period of 11 years". Though several alderman at the meeting expressed their intention to influence Punch's return to the council, Punch's Tunks Ward seat was won by Joseph Fogg, an accountant of Palmer Street.

However less than two years later, in February 1896, Punch again sought election to the council as an alderman for Tunks Ward, and was subsequently elected. He did not renominate for a further term when it expired in February 1899 and subsequently retired.

== Later life ==
Punch was an avid sportsman and continued his interest in rowing as a vice-president of the New South Wales Rowing Association, a member of the North Shore Rowing Club, and first president of the St. Leonards (later North Sydney) Bowling Club. He also served as vice-president of the North Shore Hospital and as a director of the City Mutual Life Assurance Society.

Punch died at his home, St Helens, aged 65 on 23 February 1917. On his death, his friend George Crowley, Chairman of the City Mutual Life Assurance Society (and son of North St Leonards Public School headmaster Jeremiah Crowley), wrote his obituary noting:

Frank Punch — I speak of him in the days when he was the leading figure in North Sydney, his boys at Riverview, his beautiful home in Ridge-street ably presided over by his charming wife, the scene of the most brilliant gatherings in the northern suburbs — combined the simple faith and gentle simplicity of the Irish peasant with all the astuteness and strong commonsense of the educated college Australian who has travelled all over the world.

Survived by his wife, two daughters and three sons, he was buried at Gore Hill Cemetery following a service at St Mary's Catholic Church, North Sydney. Sarah Punch continued to live at St Helens until its sale in 1926. She died age 75 on 23 December 1932, and was buried with him at Gore Hill Cemetery. St Helens has been heritage-listed on the North Sydney Local Environmental Plan since 1989. In the early 1920s, North Sydney Council commissioned a full-length portrait of Punch, with the artist combining traditional oil paint and a photographic technique based on an earlier photographic portrait of Punch, and since 1926 has been hung in the Council Chambers.

Civic offices
Preceded by Benjamin Jenkins	Mayor of St Leonards; 1889–1890	Succeeded by Gerard Phillips
Preceded by Gerard Phillips	Mayor of St Leonards; 1890	Council abolished
New title	Mayor of North Sydney; 1890–1892	Succeeded by Gerard Phillips
