= Isaac Ives =

Australian politician (1840–1906)

Isaac Ellis Ives
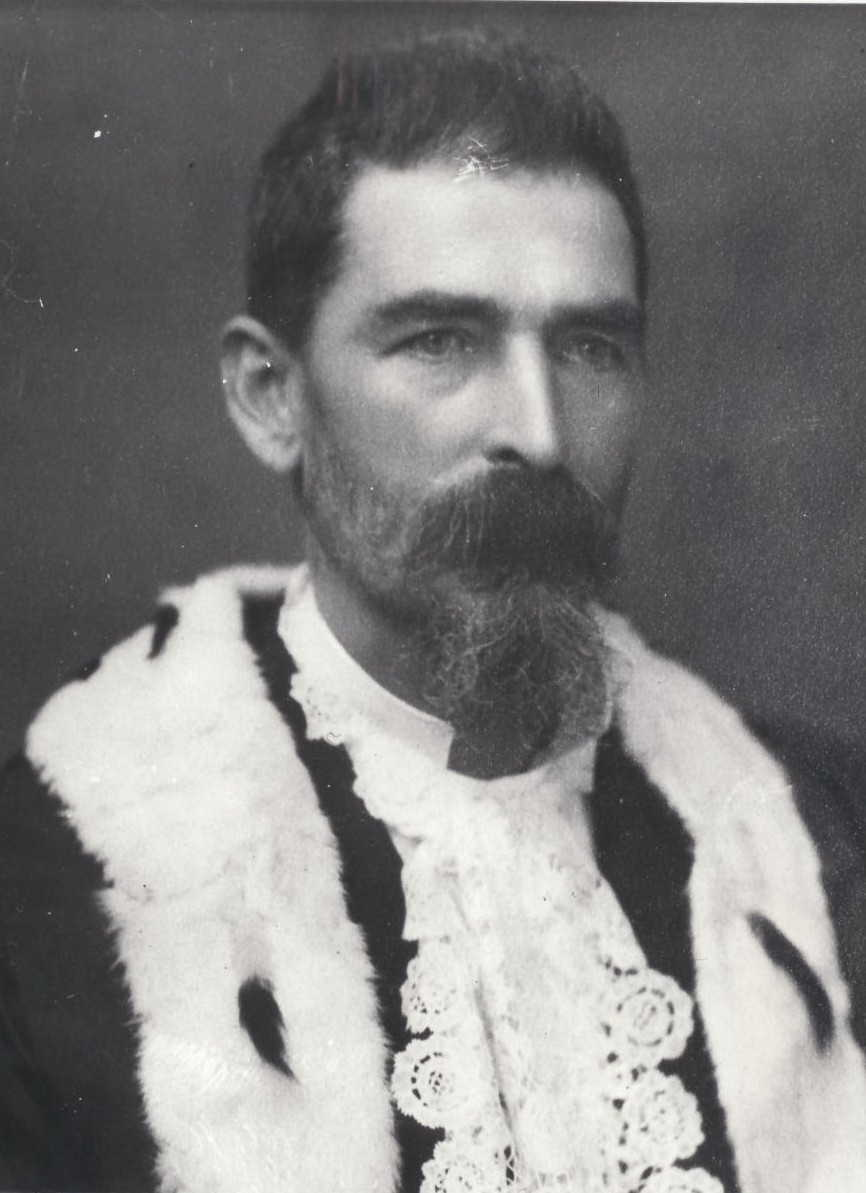
- Mayor of Sydney 1896 - 1897
- Born: 20 May 1840; Great Waltham, Essex, England
- Died: 7 December 1906 (aged 66); Mosman, Sydney, NSW, Australia
- Burial place: St Thomas Rest Park
- Occupation: Sydney Politician
- Years active: 1874-1897
- Known for: 39th Mayor of Sydney

Isaac Ellis Ives (20 March 1840 – 7 December 1906) was an English-born Australian politician.

Ives was born at Great Waltham in Essex to retired overseer Isaac Ives and Susanna Field. He went to London at a young age and in 1857 migrated to Sydney to work at a Tooth & Co. brewery. In 1858 he married Henrietta Weston, with whom he had three children; a second marriage, in 1865 to Elene McDonald, produced a further seven children. From 1860 he managed a number of warehouses for Tooth & Co.

From 1874 to 1879 he served as 3rd Mayor to the Borough of Victoria in Sydney's Lower North Side. In 1885 he was elected to the New South Wales Legislative Assembly for St Leonards, serving until he retired in 1889. He was a Sydney City Councillor from 1893 to 1898, serving as 39th Mayor from 1896 to 1897. Ives died at Mosman in 1906.

Ives Steps Wharf, located in The Rocks area was named after him around 1896., as he was known to row himself to these steps from his residence across the harbour. The steps were previously known as the Waterman's Steps, the name stemming from the individual 'watermen' who would row people the short distance from Dawes Point to Blues Point or Milson's Point for a small charge.

Civic offices
Preceded by Thomas John Cook	Mayor of Victoria; 1874–1879	Succeeded by Frederick Smith
Preceded by Samuel Lees	Mayor of Sydney; 1896–1897	Succeeded by Matthew Harris
New South Wales Legislative Assembly
Preceded by George Dibbs; Bernhardt Holtermann	Member for St Leonards; 1885–1889; Served alongside: Sir Henry Parkes	Succeeded by John Burns; Joseph Cullen
