= Evelyn Strang =

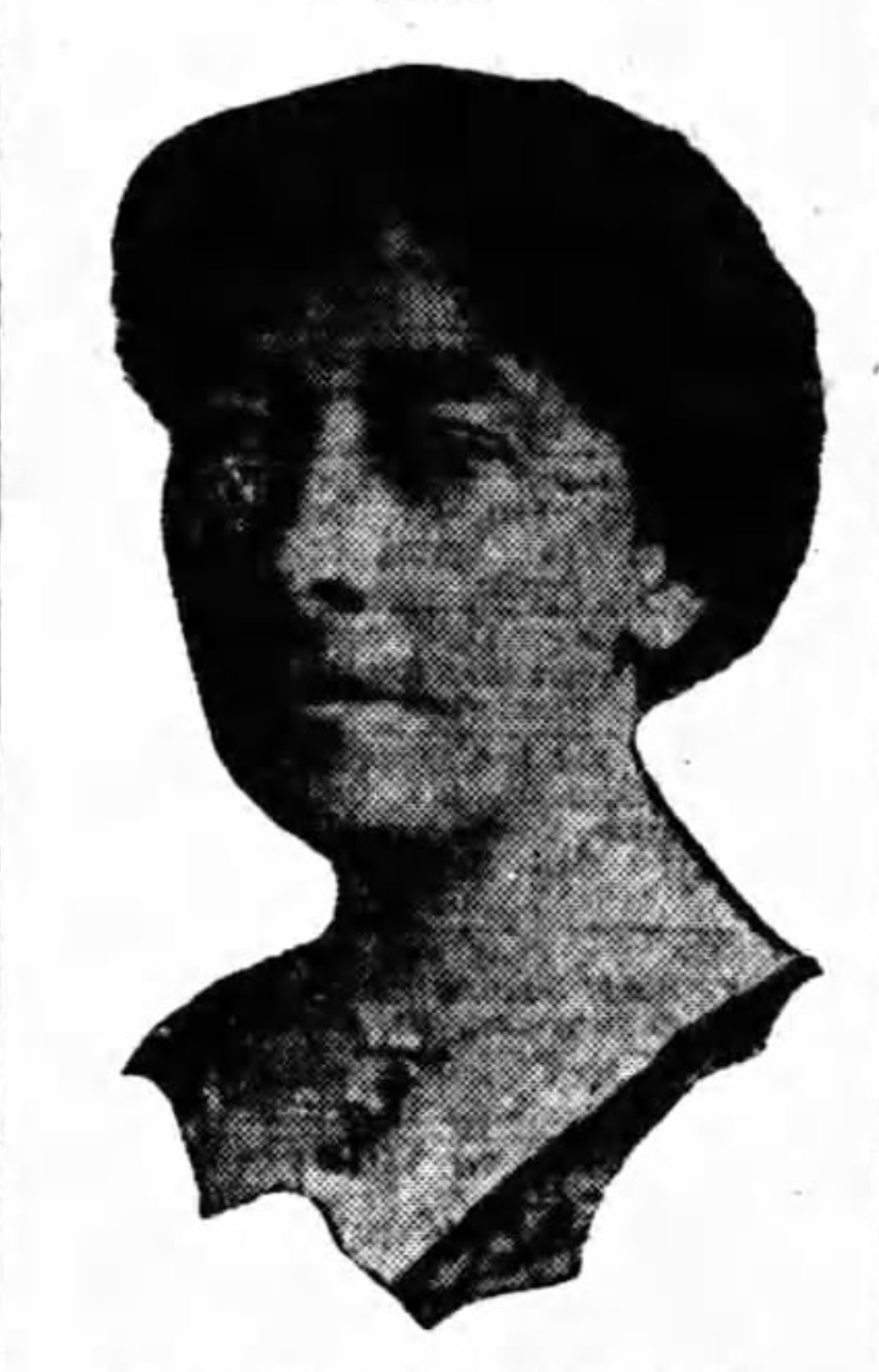
- Strang in 1928
- Born: Evelyn Clara Mill; February 23, 1867; Sydney, New South Wales, Australia
- Died: May 14, 1954 (aged 87); Wahroonga, Australia
- Burial place: Gore Hill Memorial Cemetery
- Occupations: social reformer; suffragist
- Known for: President, Australian Woman’s Christian Temperance Union

Evelyn Strang (1867–1954) was an Australian temperance leader and suffragist. She served for three years as President of the Australian Woman's Christian Temperance Union (WCTU).

== Early life and education ==
Evelyn Clara Mill was born at Sydney, New South Wales, on February 23, 1867. Her parents, John and Emily, were abstainers.

She was educated in a Church of England day-school, at home, and at a young ladies' Seminary.

== Career ==
At an early age, Strang signed the temperance pledge and at the age of nineteen, identified herself with the WCTU. Joining first the Burwood Union, she later entered the Chatswood Union, and subsequently became one of the founders of Willard Union and its president. She served as treasurer of a local Union in 1886; president of the New South Wales Union, 1915–19; vice-president of the Australian WCTU, 1921–24; acting president, 1922–23; and president of the Australian Union from 1927.

Strang was the WCTU representative on the National Council of Women of Australia (1921–25). From 1919 to 1926, she was a member of the executive of the New South Wales Prohibition Alliance.

Strang attended the World's WCTU Convention at London in 1920, with Lady Julia Holder, then Australasian president, as the leader of the Australasian delegation. While in London, Strang was the Australian delegate to the British Commonwealth League, which was celebrating the enfranchisement of Englishwomen. While in Great Britain, she took part in Scotland's first no-license campaign. She is an effective speaker and gave many temperance addresses in various communities of the Commonwealth. Her particular objectives were woman suffrage as a weapon for fighting the drink traffic, and the introduction of scientific temperance instruction into the public schools. Through her efforts, an annual examination in hygiene and temperance was instituted in the public schools of New South Wales. While not compulsory, it benefited the pupils. Since its adoption, Strang served on the Health and Temperance Examination Board.

In 1928, Strang attended the World's WCTU Convention in Lausanne, Switzerland. In the following year, she was a leader in the fight to keep Canberra, the national capital, dry.

She was actively interested in several other associations in Sydney, principally in the Women's Missionary Association, the YWCA, and the City Mission.

== Personal life ==
She married Walter S. Strang, of Glasgow, Scotland, on April 17, 1895. They had two children, Lillas and Marion.

Evelyn Strang died in Wahroonga, on May 14, 1954, and was buried at Gore Hill Memorial Cemetery.
