= Bernard Kieran =

Australian swimmer

Barney Kieran
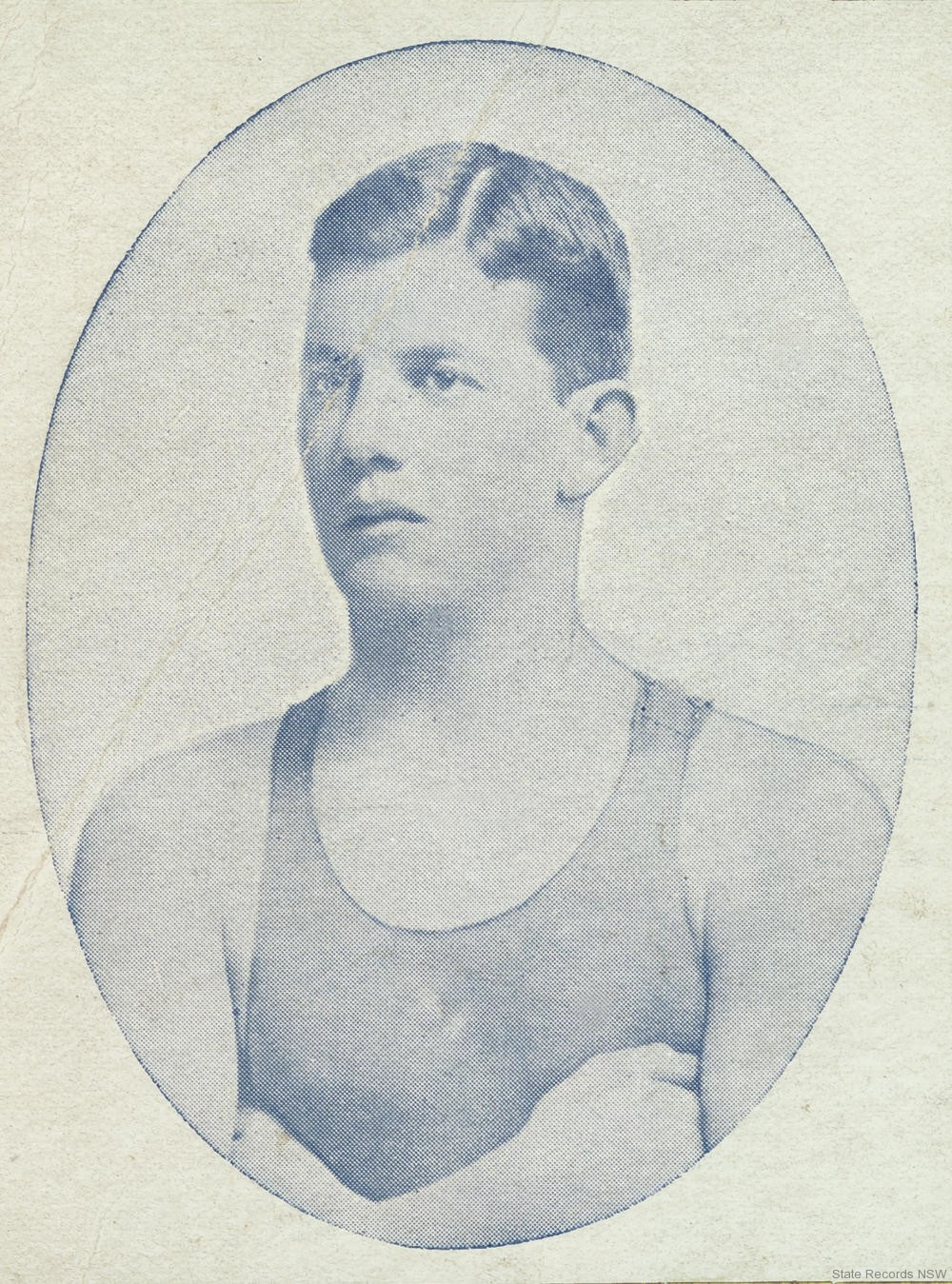

Personal information
- Full name: Bernard Bede Kieran
- Nickname: Barney
- Nationality: Australian
- Born: 6 October 1886
- Died: 22 December 1905 (aged 19) Brisbane, Queensland

Sport
- Country: Australia
- Sport: Swimming

Bernard Bede (Barney) Kieran (6 October 1886 – 22 December 1905) was an Australian swimmer. During the course of his swimming career, he set several world records and earned many medals. A memorial was created at his grave in his honour and a swimming race was named after him.

== Personal ==
Kieran was born on 6 October 1886 and his step-father was Mr. Conlon. His biological father, Patrick Kieran, was killed in a train accident when Kieran was very young. Kieran spent several years attached to Sobraon, a training ship, starting in March 1900 when he was thirteen years old. At the time, the ship was an industrial school and reformatory. He came to be aboard the ship because he did not attend school and wandered the streets and the water police court eventually ordered that he serve a sentence aboard it. He returned from a 1905 trip to London via the R.M.S. Orontes.

Kieran died on 22 December 1905 following an operation to remove his appendix in Brisbane. His body was moved by train to Sydney for his funeral, arriving on 25 December 1905. He was survived by his mother and step-father.

== Swimming ==
Kieran was described at one point by The Brisbane Courier as the world's greatest swimmer. He was a New South Wales swimming champion. On 28 August 1905 in Leeds, Kieran set a world record in the 500 yard free style event in a 25 yards long pool with a time of 6 minutes, 7 and 1/5 seconds. He held other swimming world records including in the 200, 300, 500 and 1000 yards and mile events. His fastest time in the mile was 23 minutes 16.8 seconds, a very fast time during that era in swimming. During the course of his swimming career, he earned a number of medals which included 26 golds, 8 silvers and two bronzes, were later given to the ship.

Kieran started swimming in 1904 following encouragement from W Hilton Mitchell while Kieran was serving time abroad the Sobraon. He competed at a race in at the Bath Swimming Club on 26 June 1905, winning the 600 yard race with a time of 7 minutes 2.25 seconds. This bettered his best New South Wales time for the same distance which was he set at the Farmer's Rushcutter Bay Baths with a time of 7 minutes 45 seconds. During his swimming career, he competed in swimming carnivals in Brisbane. He competed in a swimming race in Sweden, setting a world record in the 500 meters and winning four events.

== Honours ==
In 1918, a swimming race was named in Kieran's honour that was called the B.B. Kieran Memorial Race. In 1906, the North Sydney District Swimming Club worked to create a memorial dedicated to him for his grave. It was erected and unveiled in August 1906 at the Gore Hill Cemetery in North Sydney. He was inducted into the International Swimming Hall of Fame in 1969.

== See also ==
- List of members of the International Swimming Hall of Fame
