= William Dind =

Australian hotelier (c.1813–1895)

William Dind (c. 1813 – 23 January 1895) was an hotelier and theatre manager in Sydney, Australia, where he was the longtime lessee of the Royal Victoria, and Prince of Wales theatres. He settled on Sydney's North Shore, where he was active in local government, and he and his son William Forster Dind, a.k.a. W. Forster Dind (frequently misspelled "Foster") or William Dind jun, ran hotels which were popular with theatrical people.

== History ==
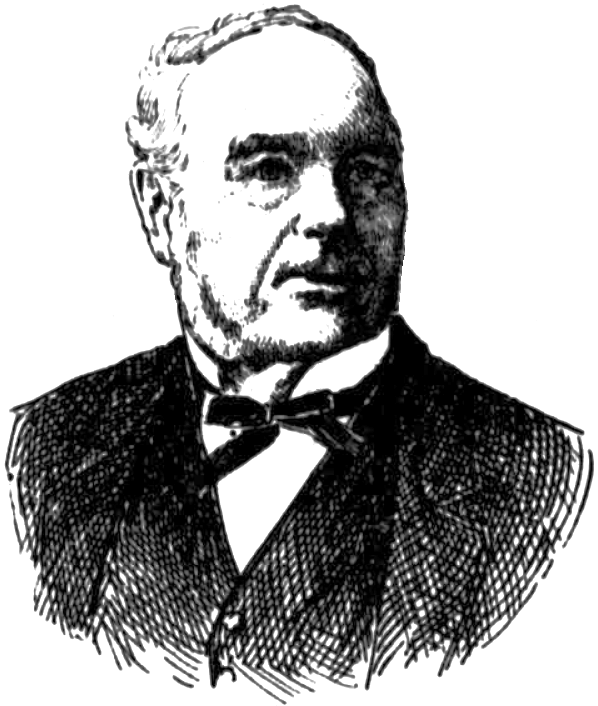
William Dind

Dind was the youngest son of Francis Dind MD, of Shadwell, London, and emigrated to Hobart Town, Van Diemen's Land (now Tasmania), arriving as a single cabin passenger on the barque Duckenfield in May 1834. He was licensee of (in turn from 1836) the Mitre Tavern, corner of Argyle and Collins streets; the Mogul Tavern on Argyle Street; and the Bricklayers Arms on Elizabeth Street, He became well-known in Hobart for his proficiency as an oarsman.

=== Sydney hotels ===
Approximate hotel locations
1 Dind's Hotel
2 Lily of St Leonards

He moved to Sydney in 1840, where he first came to public notice as licensee of the "Clown Tavern" (previously Newman's "Cornwallis Frigate") on Pitt Street, opposite the Victoria Theatre. In 1844 Dind sold his interest in the "Clown" to George Coppin (Note: Coppin lost money while its licensee; he quit the hotel business and the stage and left for Melbourne; he sold out to George Skinner; it was demolished in 1846 and rebuilt as the "Shakespeare Tavern" by William Knight. A notable licensee was Thomas Spencer. By 1850 Skinner had his own hotel at the corner of George and Hunter streets.) He then took over the "Star and Garter", over the road and adjacent the theatre, which he co-managed with Joseph Wyatt. He relinquished that hotel when he took up residence at Milsons Point, and in 1848 took over a hotel on the Western Wharf Road, the "Cornish Arms", which he renamed the "Lily of St Leonards", St Leonards being the township now known as North Sydney, and perhaps a humorous reference to the Dibdin play. By October 1853, when the hotel was put on the market, it was commonly called "Dind's Hotel". The name "Lily of St Leonards" stuck until at least 1910.

By 1858 Dind had established another inn, registered as "Dind's Hotel", his eldest son William Dind jun. being the licensee. The cottage-style hotel, with its garden and uninterrupted view of the harbour, and Dind's store of theatrical anecdotes and memorabilia (he had a remarkable collection of photographs), became a favorite haunt of actors and artists.

=== Sydney theatres ===
In 1855 Wyatt built the Prince of Wales Theatre on Castlereagh Street, and Dind served as its general manager until 3 October 1860, when the theatre was destroyed by fire, (Note: Wyatt had meanwhile been declared insolvent and died on 19 July 1860.) and Dind returned to the "Vic" as its lessee. During this time he acted as Australian agent for Mary Provost, the Marsh Family, and procured other acts for the two theatres.

The Prince of Wales, rebuilt as the Prince of Wales Opera House, opened on 23 May 1863, and Dind succeeded Coppin as lessee in 1868, then it too was destroyed by fire in January 1872, and Dind quit the theatre business. In his 20 years as theatre lessee and manager he won the respect and friendship of many prominent theatre people, including William Andrews, James H. Rainford, and William Hoskins. He was universally recognised as an honorable businessman: he dealt fairly with every contract, and in the months when the theatre was making heavy losses, no employee had a reduction in salary.

=== Local government ===
As a resident of Sydney's North Shore, Dind was interested in local affairs, and in 1868 when the Borough of East St Leonards was declared, Dind was elected alderman, and in 1873, shortly after he retired from theatre management, he became mayor, and was re-elected 1874, 1875, and 1876. In 1888 he was obliged to absent himself from meetings on account of illness, and resigned four months later.

Dind died at "Shadwell", Cowles Road, Mosman Bay, home of his granddaughters. His remains were buried at St Thomas's cemetery.

== Family ==
William Dind (c. 1813 – 23 January 1895) married Eliza Rebecca Paterson (c. 1814 – 22 November 1893) in 1834. Eliza was daughter of William Joseph Paterson and Elizabeth Paterson, née Fidler.

- William Forster Dind (1836 – 9 April 1907), only son of William Dind, born in Hobart, but lived on Sydney's North Shore district from around 1848 until his death. He built the hotel at Milsons Point, at the corner of Fitzroy and Alfred streets. He was a champion rower; both he and his father competed at the Hobart Regatta of 1862. He married Jane Fowler (1839 – 22 December 1885) on 19 June 1858. They had eleven children, including:

- Florence Eliza "Tottie" Dind (27 March 1859 – 11 January 1929) married Thomas Goodwin Brocklehurst (died 23 March 1912) on 4 March 1885
- William Don Wilton "Sonnie" Dind (27 February 1861 – 18 October 1895) married Mary Ann Stockman (1861 – 25 April 1897) on c. June 1887. The Dind's Hotel license was transferred by Mary Ann Dind to George Edward Goosey in 1897.
- Arthur Tait Dind (8 November 1864 – 27 July 1933) married Florence Josephine Ancher (died 8 September 1925) on 28 April 1888. Some family in Katoomba.
- Alice Rebecca Dind (31 August 1868 – 10 March 1961) married Capt. John Duthie Sydney Phillips (c. 1865 – 28 October 1945) on 11 October 1894.
- Adelaide Louise Dind (c. 1870 – 26 June 1952) married Capt. Arthur Eyre Dabelle (c. 1868 – 18 October 1925) on 9 April 1896
- Forster George Heddle Dind (2 July 1873 – 24 June 1930) was hotelier in 1911. married Anne Robertson Charles on 21 August 1904, divorced 1925. On army enlistment form wrote his name as Foster George Dind, gave false age indicating DOB c. July 1876. She divorced him for desertion 1925 but published, as "loving wife", an In Memoriam notice eight years later. They had two children.
- Leslie Albert Dind (13 October 1874 – 27 April 1940) married Jean Webster.
- Melbourne Hall Dind (born 6 January 1878) married Janet Wright Simpson (1876–1949) in October 1896; divorced 1902, she later became Janet Wright Armour.

- Melbourne Forster Dind (born 1897) married Pamela Joan Mudge?

- (possibly) Melbourne Forster/Foster Dind, born c. 1925 was lawbreaker in Sydney 1942.

M. H. Dind married again, to Jessie Mackenzie Boyle in Queensland, moved c. 1908 to New Zealand, where in 1919 she divorced him for desertion. He was working for the Defence Department at the time and playing cricket at club level. He has been confused with the Wellington cricketer M. Dind.
- Forster Boyle Dind (1909– )
- Jean Adelaide Dind (1911–2002)
M. H. Dind married again, to Deborah Mary Costello (c. 1900 – 15 March 1961)

- Nea Emily Dind (1880–1946) married Charles H. Hicks in 1915
- Sydney Septimus Dind (1885–1958) married Lillian; enlisted with First AIF but repatriated due to iritis 1917.
W. F. Dind married again, to Emily Rosetta Horne, née Paterson, perhaps a cousin, (c. 1855 – c. 5 August 1934). of Cremorne, sometime after 1885. Emily was daughter of Thomas (died in Auckland 28 April 1877) and Rosetta (died in Dunedin 20 June 1891) Paterson, previously of Hobart. She was executor of W. F. Dind's will.
- David Dind

- David Saville Dind (10 June 1915 – 1997), solicitor, born at Wanganui, New Zealand; married Helen Mabel Steel (born 8 October 1913), youngest daughter of A. W. Steel of Mosman, previously of Cootamundra, in February 1937 and flew to New Zealand for their honeymoon.
