= William Branwhite Clarke =

English geologist and clergyman

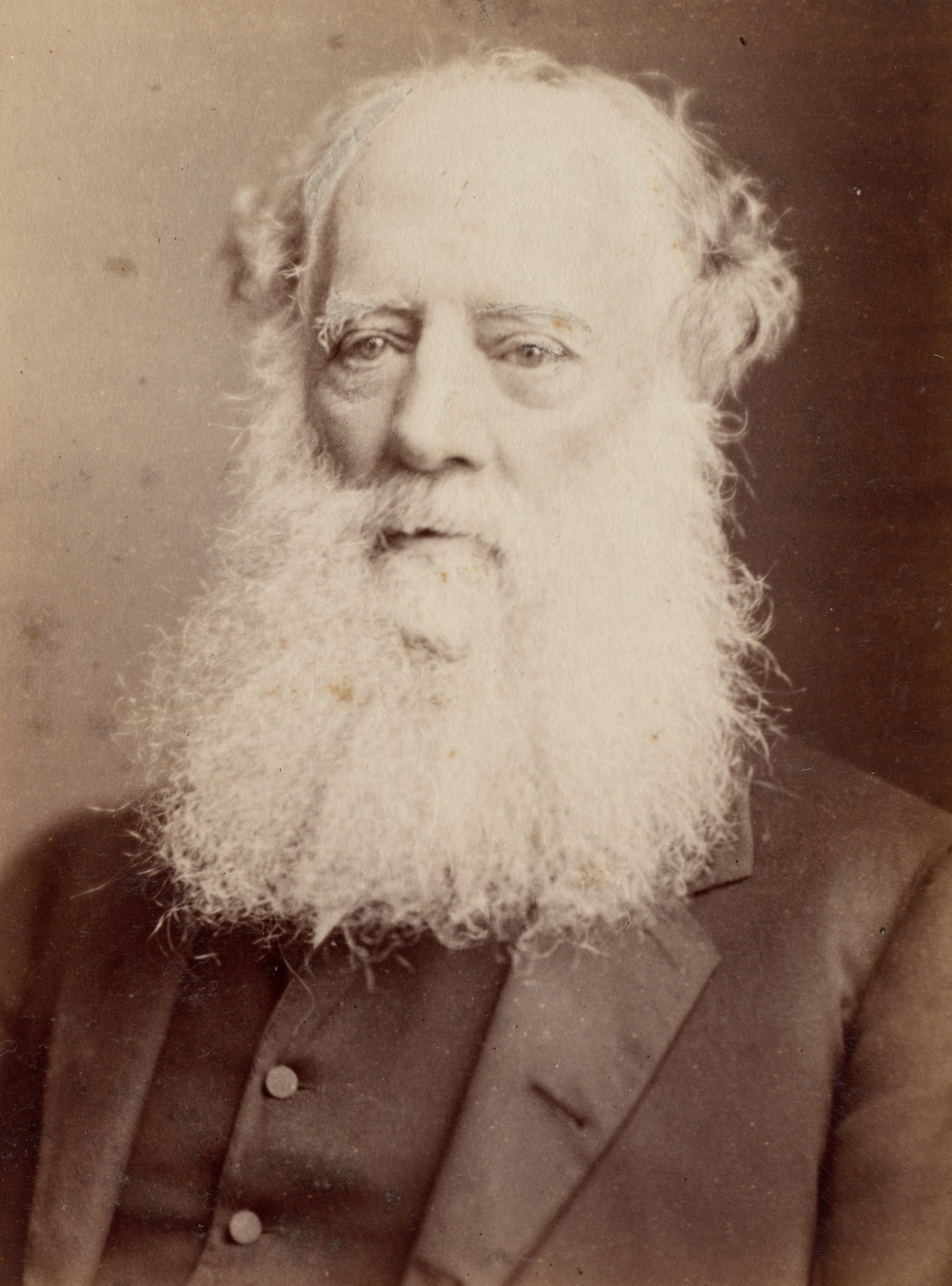
- Portrait of William Branwhite Clark, c. 1875, by J Hubert Newman
- Born: 2 June 1798; England
- Died: 16 June 1878 (aged 80); Waverton
- Burial place: St Thomas Rest Park
- Occupation: geologist

William Branwhite Clarke, FRS (2 June 1798 – 16 June 1878) was an English geologist and clergyman, active in Australia.

== Early life and England ==
Clarke was born at East Bergholt, in Suffolk, the eldest child of William Clarke, schoolmaster, and his wife Sarah, née Branwhite. He was partly educated at his father's house, under the Rev. R. G. S. Brown, B.D., and partly at Dedham Grammar School.

In October 1817, he went to Cambridge and entered into residence at Jesus College. He took his BA degree in 1821, and obtained his MA degree in 1824.

In 1821, he was appointed curate of Ramsholt in Suffolk, and he acted in his clerical capacity in other places until 1839. He was also master of the Free School of East Bergholt for 18 months in 1830–1. Having become interested in geology through the teachings of Adam Sedgwick, he used his opportunities and gathered many interesting facts on the geology of East Anglia which were embodied in a paper On the Geological Structure and Phenomena of Suffolk (Trans. Geol. Soc. 1837). He also communicated a series of papers on the geology of S.E. to the Magazine of Nat. Hist. (1837–1838).

== Career in Australia ==
In 1839, after a severe illness, Clarke left England for New South Wales, mainly with the object of benefiting by the sea voyage.

Clarke was headmaster of The King's School, Parramatta, in May 1839 until the end of 1840. Until 1870 he ministered to parishes from Parramatta to the Hawkesbury River, then of Campbelltown, and finally of Willoughby. He zealously devoted attention to the geology of the country, with results that have been of paramount importance. In 1841 he found specimens of gold, but he was not the first European who had obtained it in situ in the country. (This honour goes correctly to Government Surveyor James McBrien who found flakes at Locksley NSW in February 1823). Clarke described finding it both in the detrital deposits and in the quartz reefs west of the Blue Mountains, the same area where McBrien had found it, and he declared his belief in its abundance. Mr R Lowe, Lieutenant William Lawson, an unnamed convict (who was flogged for the discovery), Dr Johann Lhotsky, and "Count" Paul Strzelecki had also found gold in Australia before Clarke. It appears they mostly had found alluvial flakes, whereas Clarke had found it embedded in quartz rocks. He was buried in the St Thomas cemetery, the graveyard of the North Shore church he was rector of for many years; and his widow and some descendants and relatives are close by.

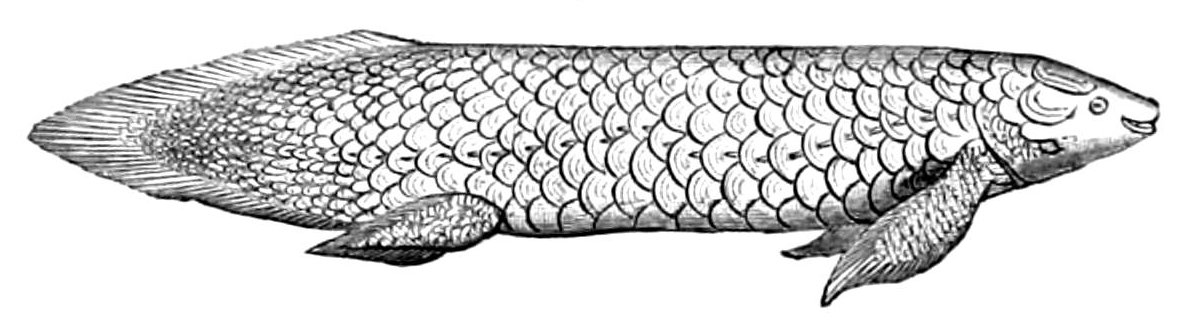
Queensland lungfish
(Neoceratodus forsteri).

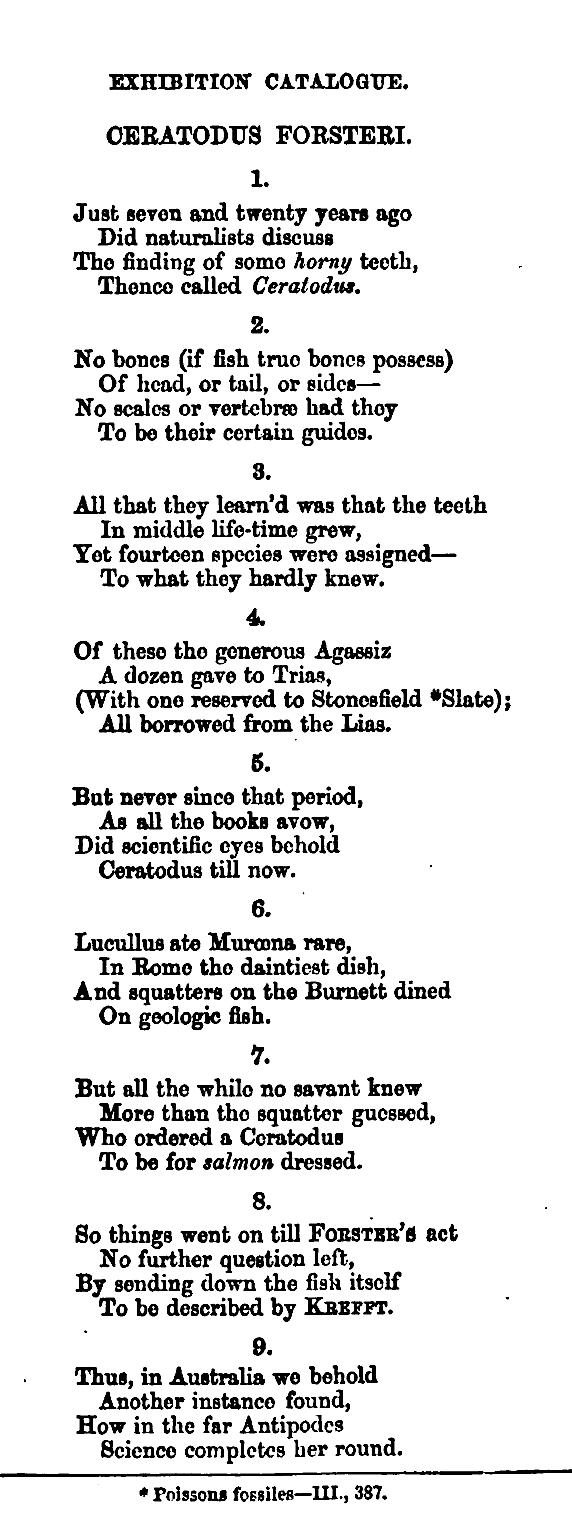
Poem: "Ceratodus Forsteri",
W.B. Clarke (1871a).

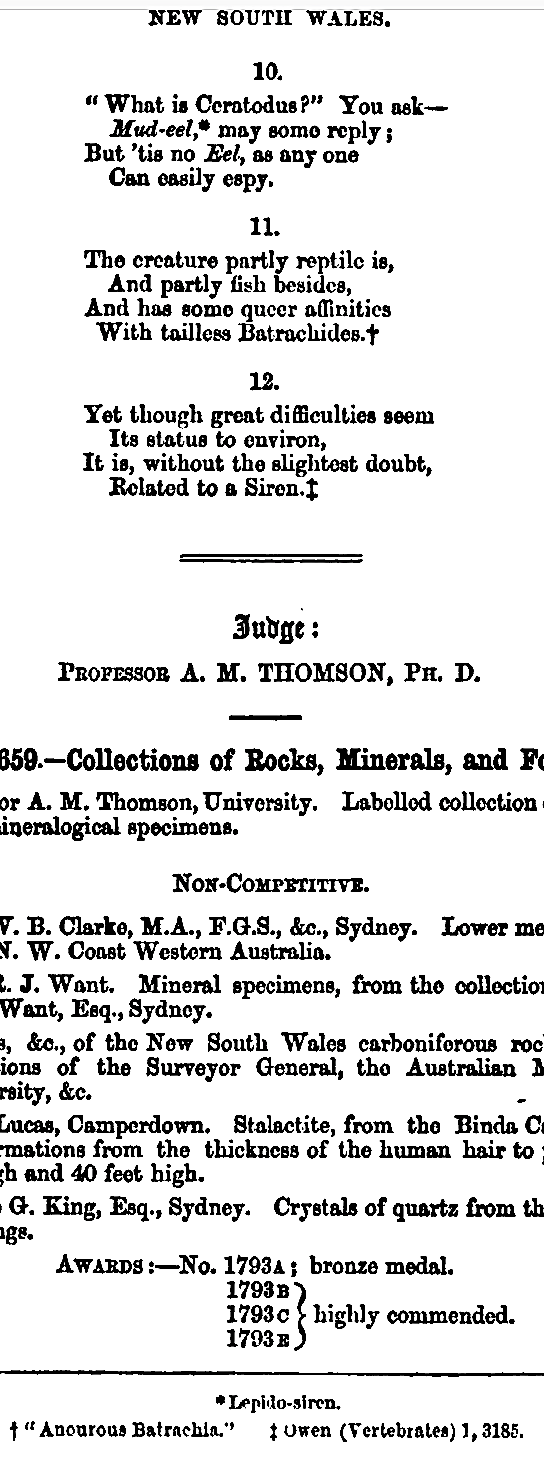
Poem: "Ceratodus Forsteri",
W.B. Clarke (1871b).

== Legacy ==
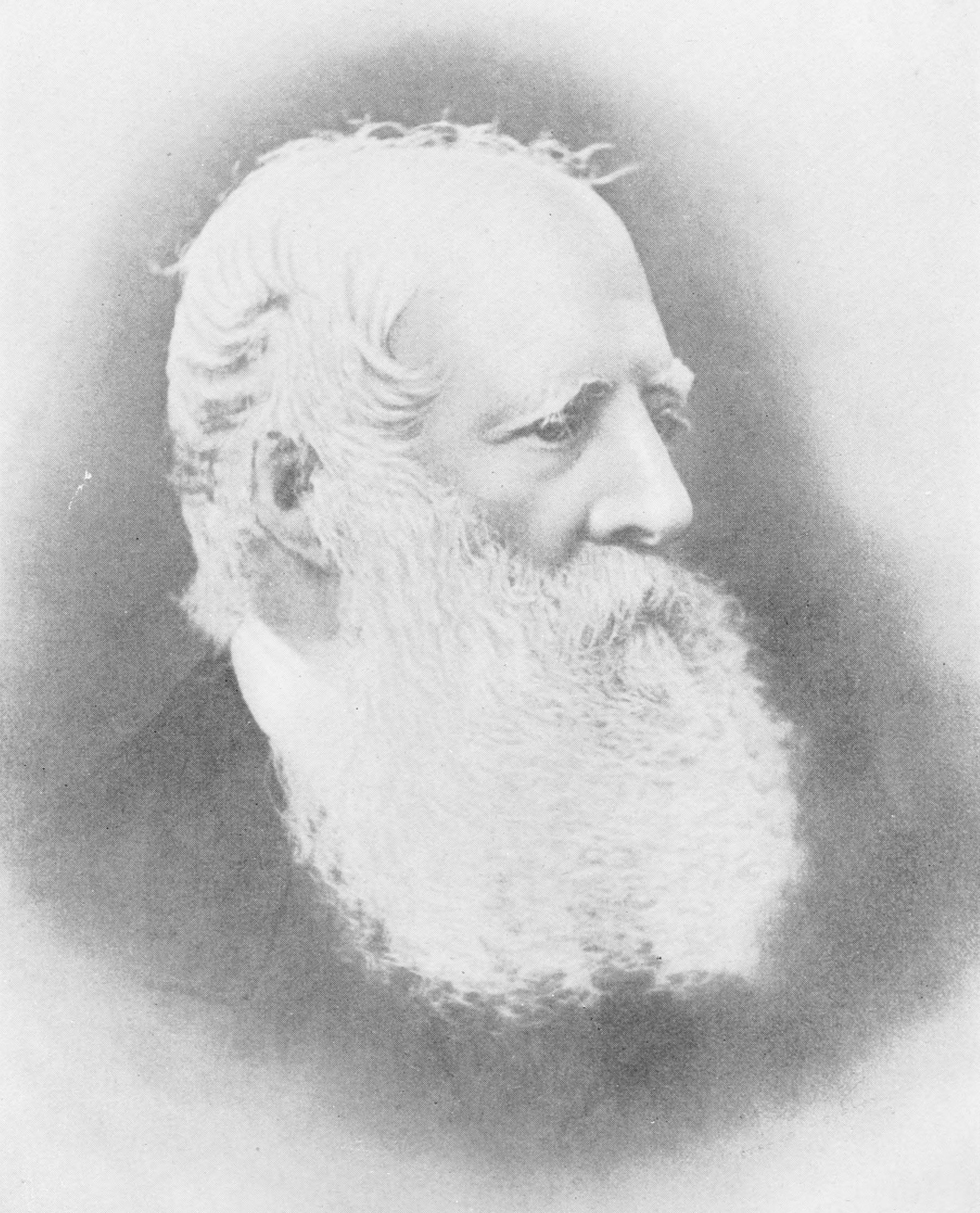
William Branwhite Clarke

Clarke was a trustee of the Australian Museum at Sydney, and an active member of the Royal Society of New South Wales of which he was vice-president 1866–1878; the Clarke Medal awarded by the Society is named in his honour. In 1860 he published Researches in the Southern Gold Fields of New South Wales. He was elected Fellow of the Royal Society in 1876, and in the following year was awarded the Murchison Medal by the Geological Society of London. His contributions to Australian scientific journals were numerous. He died near Sydney. His name is commemorated in the William Clarke College school at Kellyville, NSW and the WB Clarke Geoscience Centre at Londonderry, NSW operated by the Geological Survey of New South Wales.

His works in geology included the field of palaeontology and his collections and receipt of fossil material formed the foundation of research on Australia's extinct flora and fauna. Clarke did not describe the specimens he avidly collected throughout his life, these were instead forwarded to societies in England for their scientific examination. The results of his contemporaries studies and descriptions of Australian palaeontology and geology were incorporated into his own publications, and he remained current with advances in these fields despite his remote location.

== See also ==
- Australian gold rushes – Mass movement of Australians seeking gold (1851–1910s)
- William Clarke College
