= Joseph Wyatt (theatre owner) =

Joseph Wyatt (1788 – 20 July 1860) was a theatre owner and manager, in the early years of theatre in Sydney, Australia.

== Life ==
Wyatt became prosperous as a haberdasher in Pitt Street, Sydney, and in 1833 he sold the business and invested in property. From April 1835 he was one of six lessees of the Theatre Royal in George Street, the first commercial theatre in Sydney. From May 1836 he was sole lessee.

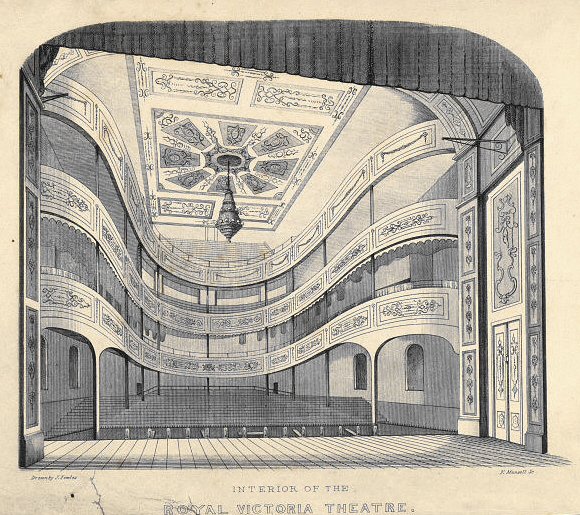
Interior of the Royal Victoria Theatre

In 1836 he planned another, larger, theatre in Sydney, the Royal Victoria Theatre. The foundation stone was laid on 7 September of that year, and the new theatre in Pitt Street, opened on 26 March 1838, with William Dind co-manager. In the same year Wyatt bought the Theatre Royal from the widow of its owner Barnett Levey, who died the previous year. That theatre burned down in 1840.

The population of Sydney was small in relation to the size of the Royal Victoria Theatre, so that a proper repertoire could not be built up: there were frequent changes of programme, leading to poorly rehearsed performances. In March 1841 Wyatt sailed for England to recruit actors, returning in January 1843. The new actors engaged faced opposition from the Sydney actors, and the Sydney Morning Herald commented on 25 January 1843: "Of the twelve brought out by him from England there is not one equal in ability to the leading members, male or female, of the old company". Wyatt eventually sacked some of his actors.

On 24 May (Note: The Queen's Birthday. Its full name, only occasionally invoked, was Royal City Theatre.) 1843 he opened the City Theatre, on Market Street, adjacent the Crown and Anchor Inn (later Roberts's Hotel). It was previously a shop, but long enough to accommodate a stage and seating for a few hundred patrons. It was rarely used for plays however, rather for lectures, public meetings and dinners, and examinations. In 1846 the lease was advertised for sale by auction. In 1854 it became a furniture showroom. The City Theatre reopened on 24 March 1856 with a musical company compered by the comedian W. H. Stephens. Several good productions were mounted there, but the theatre did not pay, and after a few years became an auction mart.

Wyatt sold the Royal Victoria Theatre in 1854. He built a new theatre in Sydney, the Prince of Wales Theatre, on Castlereagh Street, at a cost of about £30,000. It had a dress circle, upper boxes and gallery, and was said to seat about 3,000. It opened on 12 March 1855. "It was soon apparent," wrote an obituarist, "that two theatres would not pay in Sydney ... and was at length compelled to take the benefit of the Insolvent Act." Attempts were made in 1856 to turn it into a casino. Wyatt sold the theatre at a heavy loss in 1858.

He died on 20 July 1860, and was buried at Camperdown Cemetery. An obituarist wrote, "in his dealings with the public and the professionals during the twenty-five years he was connected with the theatres, [he] managed to secure the respect of both".
