= Borough of St Leonards =

Former local government area in New South Wales, Australia

Borough of St Leonards New South Wales
- Established: 31 May 1867
- Abolished: 29 July 1890
- Area: 15.8 km^{2} (6.1 sq mi)
- Parish: Willoughby
LGAs around Borough of St Leonards:
North Willoughby	North Willoughby	Manly
North Willoughby	Borough of St Leonards	Port Jackson
Victoria	East St Leonards	Port Jackson

The Borough of St Leonards was a local government area in the Lower North Shore region of Sydney, New South Wales, Australia. First proclaimed as the Municipality of St Leonards in 1867, it became a borough in 1868 and in 1871 a petition for the Victoria Ward to secede was accepted and the Borough Victoria was proclaimed. It included the modern suburbs of Cammeray, Mosman, Waverton, Wollstonecraft and parts of Cremorne, Neutral Bay, North Sydney and Crows Nest. The borough lasted until 29 July 1890 when it merged with the neighbouring boroughs of Victoria and East St Leonards to form the Borough of North Sydney.

== Council history ==
With the passing of The Municipalities Act, 1858, on 20 January 1866 139 residents of the St Leonards district petitioned the Colonial Government for the incorporation of the area as a "Municipality of Saint Leonards". This petition was subsequently accepted and the Governor of New South Wales, Sir John Young, proclaimed the establishment of the "Municipality of St Leonards" on 31 May 1867. On 24 December 1868 the Borough was divided into three wards: Victoria Ward (after Queen Victoria), Albert Ward (after Prince Albert) and Belmore Ward (after Governor Earl Belmore).

Edward Mawney Sayers was appointed as Returning Officer for the first election to be held on 4 July 1867. The first council, comprising nine councillors and two auditors, was first elected on 6 July 1867, and the first Chairman, William Tunks, was also elected. The Council's status was short-lived however, as the Council was granted title changes with Councillors becoming Aldermen and the Chairman becoming Mayor from 20 September 1867.

By mid-1870 a petition of 172 names was presented to the Colonial Secretary asking for the secession of the Victoria Ward and the creation of a separate borough council. The petition was accepted and on 20 January 1871 the Borough of Victoria was proclaimed by the Governor. With the excision of Victoria Ward, the Borough of St Leonards was reconstituted without wards. The Borough was divided into wards again from 30 June 1883 with the creation of Albert Ward, Tunks Ward and Belmore Ward, but with the continuing growth of population in the area the wards were reorganised on 18 September 1889 by splitting Tunks Ward into Waringa Ward and Mossman's Ward.

The Borough lasted until 29 July 1890 when it merged with the Borough of East St Leonards (1860) and the Borough of Victoria to form the "Borough of North Sydney". The Mayor, Francis Punch, became the first Mayor of North Sydney, and the Council Clerk, William Barnett Smith, became the first Council Clerk of North Sydney.

== Mayors ==
#	Chairman	Term start	Term end	Time in office	Notes
1	William Tunks	6 July 1867	20 September 1867	76 days	
#	Mayor	Term start	Term end	Time in office	Notes
–	William Tunks	20 September 1867	14 February 1883	15 years, 147 days	
2	Joseph Musgrave	14 February 1883	15 February 1884	1 year, 1 day	
3	Andrew Armstrong	15 February 1884	13 February 1885	364 days	
4	Benjamin Jenkins	13 February 1885	15 February 1889	4 years, 2 days	
5	Francis Punch	15 February 1889	12 February 1890	362 days	
6	Gerard Phillips	12 February 1890	24 June 1890	132 days	
–	Francis Punch	24 June 1890	29 July 1890	35 days	

== Council Clerks ==
Years	Clerks	Notes
6 March 1868 – 22 April 1868	George Earngey	
22 April 1868 – 8 June 1868	Edward Hughes	
8 June 1868 – 3 May 1872	George Pile	
3 May 1872 – 1 November 1874	Sydney Byron Jones Baly	
1 November 1874 – 19 March 1877	William Heron	
19 March 1877 – 28 May 1885	William Henry McLean	
28 May 1885 – 16 March 1886	Henry Brewster Macintosh	
16 March 1886 – 29 July 1890	William Barnett Smith	
