= Borough of Victoria =

Former local government area in New South Wales, Australia

Borough of Victoria New South Wales
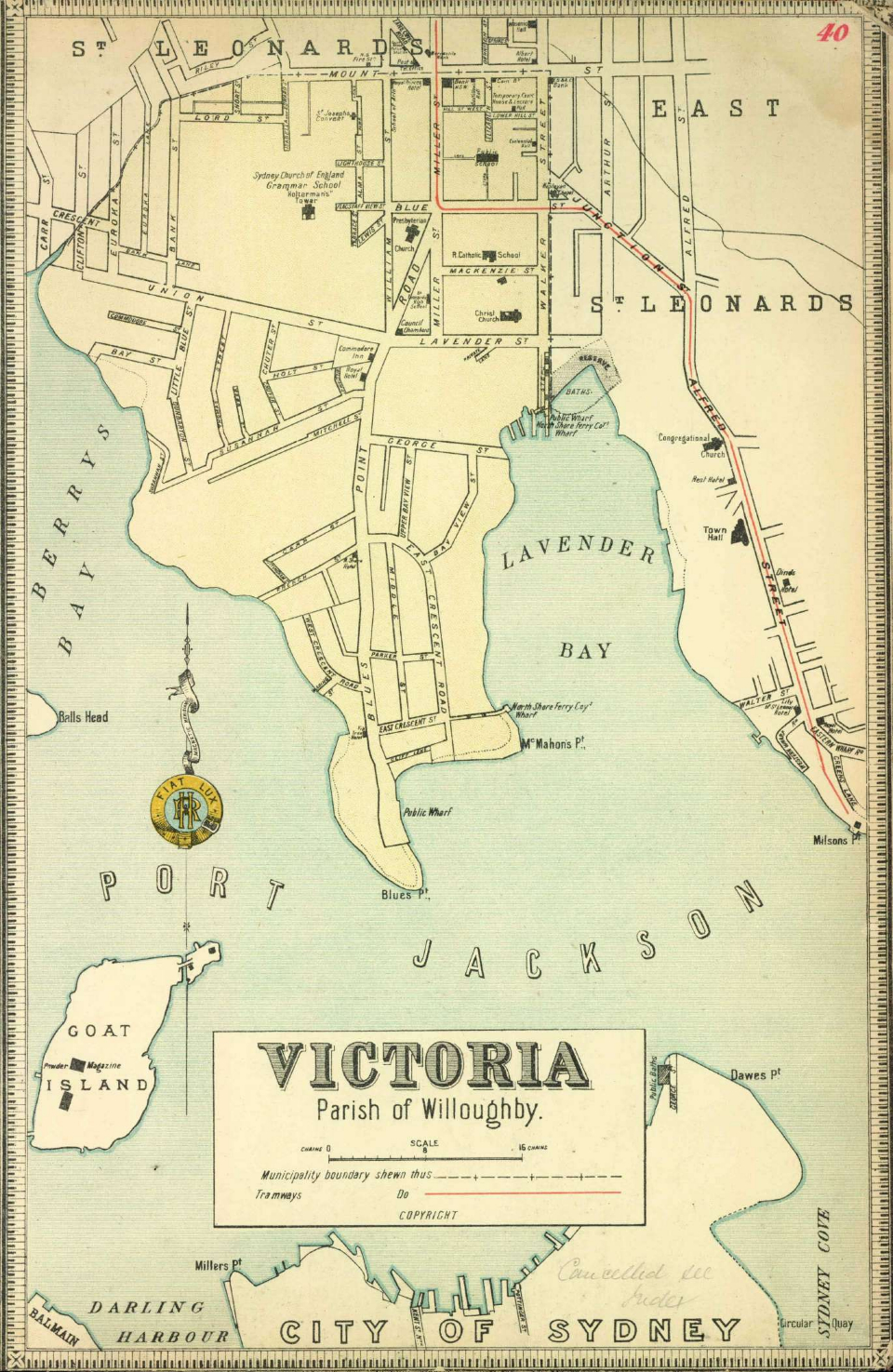
- Map of Victoria Borough from the Atlas of the Suburbs of Sydney, 1885.
- Established: 20 January 1871
- Abolished: 29 July 1890
- Area: 0.7 km^{2} (0.3 sq mi)
- Council seat: Council Chambers
- Parish: Willoughby
LGAs around Borough of Victoria:
	St Leonards
St Leonards	Borough of Victoria	East St Leonards
Berrys Bay	Port Jackson	Lavender Bay

The Borough of Victoria was a local government area in the Lower North Shore region of Sydney, New South Wales, Australia. First proclaimed as the Victoria Ward of the Borough of St Leonards in 1867, in 1871 a petition to secede was accepted and the Borough was proclaimed with an area of 0.7km2, making it the second-smallest council in Sydney after the Borough of Darlington. It included the modern suburbs of McMahons Point and parts of North Sydney and Lavender Bay. The borough lasted until 29 July 1890 when it merged with the neighbouring boroughs of St Leonards and East St Leonards to form the Borough of North Sydney.

== Council history ==
With the passing of The Municipalities Act, 1858, on 20 January 1866 139 residents of the St Leonards district petitioned the Colonial Government for the incorporation of the area as a Municipality of Saint Leonards. This petition was subsequently accepted and the Governor of New South Wales, Sir John Young, proclaimed the establishment of the Municipality of St Leonards on 31 May 1867. On 24 December 1868 the Borough was divided into wards and the Victoria Ward named after Queen Victoria encompassing Lavender Bay, McMahons Point and North Sydney was created.

However, by mid-1870 a petition of 172 names was presented to the Colonial Secretary asking for the secession of the Victoria Ward and the creation of a separate borough council. The petition was accepted and on 20 January 1871 the Borough of Victoria was proclaimed by the Governor.

Donald Munro, of Blues Point Road, was appointed as Returning Officer for the first election to be held on 10 February 1871. The first council, comprising nine Aldermen and two auditors, was first elected on 10 February 1871, and the first Mayor, Matthew Charlton Jr, was elected on 20 February. Walter George Willington was made the first Council Clerk, a position that was confirmed on 25 February.

Alderman	Notes
Henry Mohrman	Grocer, Blues Point Road.
William Carr	Carpenter, Blues Point Road.
James Hilton	Engineer, Blues Point Road.
Charles Henry Woolcott	Declined office. Town Clerk of Sydney, Blue's Bay.
William Schroder	Artist, Susannah Street. Elected 20 March 1871 to fill Woolcott's seat.
James Mackaness	Butcher, Blues Point Road.
Matthew Charlton Jr.	Freeholder, Princes Street, Sydney.
David Moores	Freeholder, Blues Point Road.
Archibald Patrick Stevens	Publican, Blues Point Road.
Samuel Crews	Stonemason, Chuter Street.
Auditors	Notes
John William Guise	Chemist, Blues Point Road.
John Clarke	Clerk, Union-street.

The Council met at its Council Chambers in the Council Clerk Willington's "London Store", at 139-141 Blues Point Road, McMahons Point. An 1889 profile of the Borough commented that "the chambers occupied by the council are of the meanest description possible, and as the total rent amounts to little more than £20 per annum, the ratepayers cannot complain of extravagance on the part of their representatives."

The small area of the Borough limited the council's ability to develop public infrastructure, with large areas described in 1889 as being "in a primitive state" and possessing no sewer connections. Alderman Frederick Smith in particular, in a September 1889 debate on amalgamation, noted that "the borough was poverty-stricken and impotent, and the time was ripe for a change", while the Illustrated Sydney News commented that "there are absolutely no lungs to the Borough of Victoria, and the people are forced to wander about the streets if they would enjoy the open air." Representatives from the Borough had met with the neighbouring boroughs of St Leonards and East St Leonards at an amalgamation conference in July 1889.

The Borough lasted until 29 July 1890 when it merged with the Borough of East St Leonards (1860) and the Borough of St Leonards to form the Borough of North Sydney.

== Mayors ==
#	Mayor	Term start	Term end	Time in office	Notes
1	Matthew Charlton	20 February 1871	15 February 1872	360 days	
2	Thomas John Cook	15 February 1872	13 February 1874	1 year, 363 days	
3	Isaac Ellis Ives	13 February 1874	13 February 1879	5 years, 0 days	
4	Frederick Smith	13 February 1879	12 February 1880	364 days	
5	Robert Moodie	12 February 1880	20 August 1880	190 days	
–	Frederick Smith	20 August 1880	15 February 1883	2 years, 179 days	
6	William Waterhouse	15 February 1883	13 February 1885	1 year, 364 days	
7	Michael McMahon	13 February 1885	9 February 1887	1 year, 361 days	
8	Donald Munro	9 February 1887	15 February 1888	1 year, 6 days	
–	Frederick Smith	15 February 1888	15 February 1889	1 year, 0 days	
–	William Waterhouse	15 February 1889	14 February 1890	364 days	
–	Michael McMahon	14 February 1890	29 July 1890	165 days	

== Council Clerks ==
Years	Clerks	Notes
20 February 1871 – 12 November 1889	Walter George Willington	
12 November 1889 – 29 July 1890	Andrew Bennet	
