= Borough of East St Leonards =

Former local government area in New South Wales, Australia

- Local government area
- Country: Australia
- State: New South Wales
- Established: 17 August 1860
- Abolished: 29 July 1890
- Council seat: East St Leonards Town Hall

Area
  - Total: 2.4 km^{2} (0.93 sq mi)
- Parish: Willoughby
LGAs around Borough of East St Leonards
	St Leonards
St Leonards	Borough of East St Leonards	St Leonards
Victoria	Port Jackson

The Borough of East St Leonards was a local government area in the Lower North Shore region of Sydney, New South Wales, Australia. First proclaimed as the "Municipality of East St Leonards" in 1860, following the passing of a new Municipalities Act became a borough in 1867. It included the modern suburbs of Kirribilli, Milsons Point, Lavender Bay (part), North Sydney (part), Neutral Bay (part), Cremorne (part), Cremorne Point and Kurraba Point. The borough lasted until 29 July 1890 when it merged with the neighbouring boroughs of St Leonards and Victoria to form the Borough of North Sydney.

== Council history ==
With the passing of the Municipalities Act 1858 (22 Vict. No. 13 (NSW)), on 14 February 1860 residents of the eastern section of the St Leonards district petitioned the colonial government for the incorporation of the area as a "St Leonards East Municipality". This petition was subsequently accepted and the Governor of New South Wales, Sir William Denison, proclaimed the establishment of the "Municipality of East St Leonards" on 17 August 1860.

Colonel George Barney, of Wotonga House, Kirribilli, was appointed as Returning Officer for the first election to be held at Dind's Hotel in Milsons Point on 13 September 1860. However, owing to "dissatisfaction caused by the limited extent of the municipal boundaries" the electors at the meeting refused to nominate anyone for the council. As a result, while the municipality de jure continued to exist, it was not until the Municipalities Act 1867 came into effect in February 1868 that the colonial government tried again to elect a functioning council for the now-"borough" of East St Leonards, with Frederic Lassetter appointed to conduct a new election.

The first council, comprising six aldermen and two auditors, was first elected on 4 February 1868, and the first mMayor, William Tucker, was elected on 10 February. Dind's Hotel in Alfred Street, Milsons Point, acted as the Council Chambers until 1886 when the East St Leonards Town Hall, also on Alfred Street and designed by future mayor Walter Liberty Vernon, was completed. The foundation of the town hall was laid by former mayor, George Matcham Pitt, on 24 October 1885, and opened on 13 May 1886 by Sir Henry Parkes.

On 8 January 1889, the council was divided into four wards electing three aldermen respectively: North, South, East and West Wards.

The borough lasted until 29 July 1890 when it merged with the Borough of St Leonards (1867) and the Borough of Victoria (1871) to form the "Borough of North Sydney". The North Sydney Municipal Council first met in the 1885 East St Leonards Town Hall on Alfred Street, Milsons Point, using it until 1926.

== Mayors ==
#	Mayor	Term start	Term end	Time in office	Notes
1	William Tucker	10 February 1868	12 February 1869	1 year, 2 days	
2	Edward Lord	12 February 1869	2 January 1873	3 years, 325 days	
3	William Dind	2 January 1873	15 February 1877	4 years, 44 days	
4	James Taylor	15 February 1877	14 February 1878	364 days	
5	Robert Palmer Abbott	14 February 1878	6 February 1879	357 days	
6	George Matcham Pitt	6 February 1879	15 February 1884	5 years, 9 days	
7	Nicholas McBurney	15 February 1884	10 February 1885	361 days	
8	Edward Mann Clark	10 February 1885	10 February 1886	1 year, 0 days	
9	George Ranken	10 February 1886	9 February 1887	364 days	
10	Walter Liberty Vernon	9 February 1887	18 February 1888	1 year, 9 days	
11	Patrick William Glacken	18 February 1888	13 February 1889	361 days	
12	Joseph William Mountford	13 February 1889	29 July 1890	1 year, 166 days	

== Council Clerks ==
Years	Clerks	Notes
1868 – December 1871	Henry Cubitt	
4 January 1872 – June 1883	George L. Coleman	
June 1883 – 2 January 1884	J. G. Fitzgerald	
2 January 1884 – 29 July 1890	Percy Augustus Temple	
