= North Sydney =

- Suburb
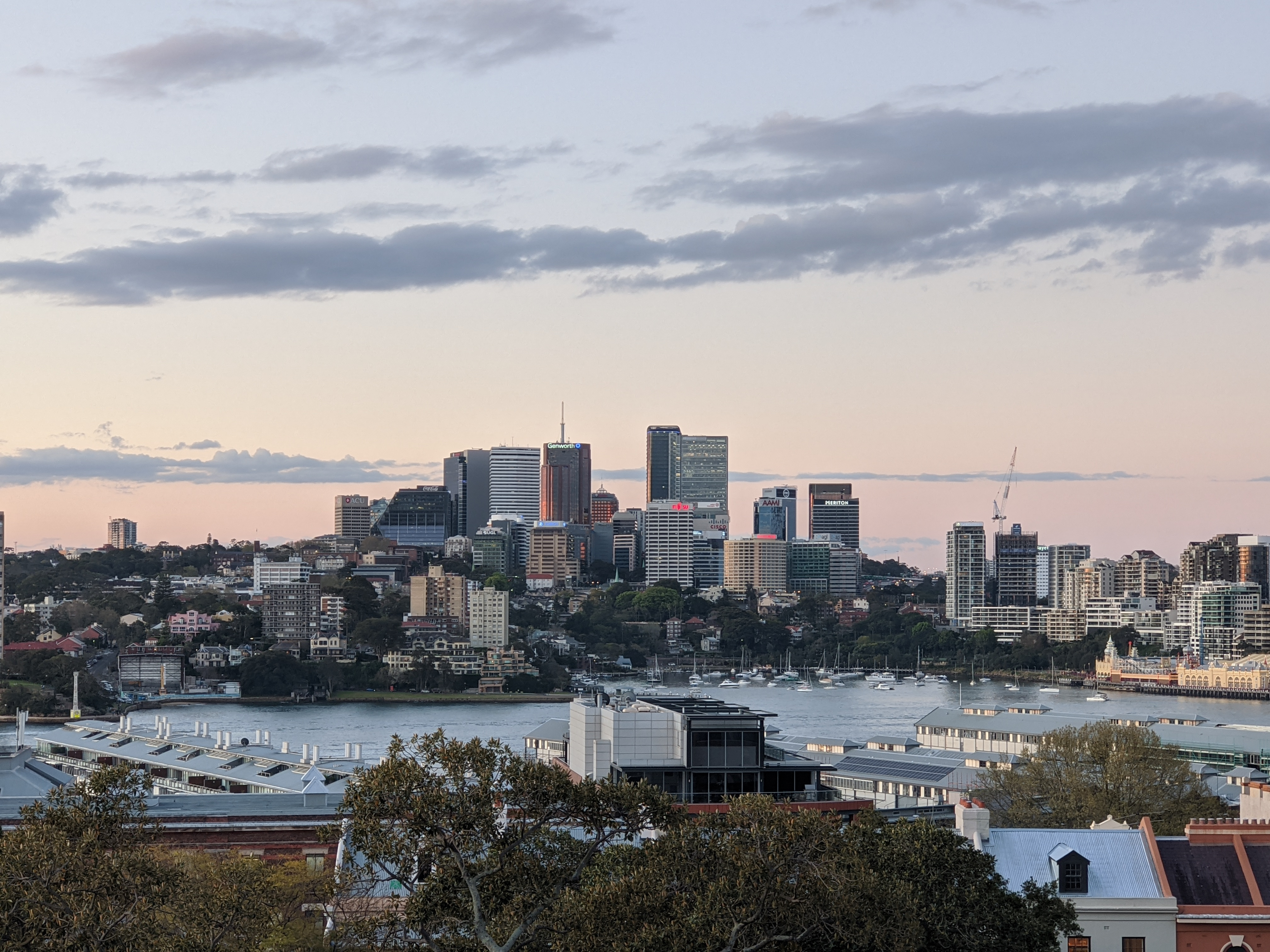
- North Sydney skyline at dusk

- Interactive map of North Sydney
- Coordinates: 33°50′23″S 151°12′19″E
- Country: Australia
- State: New South Wales
- City: Sydney
- LGA: North Sydney Council
- Location: 3 km (1.9 mi) north of Sydney CBD

Government
  - State electorates: North Shore; Willoughby
  - Federal division: Warringah

Area
  - Total: 1.4 km^{2} (0.54 sq mi)
- Elevation: 83 m (272 ft)

Population
  - Total: 8,964 (2021 census)
  - Density: 6,400/km^{2} (16,600/sq mi)
- Postcode: 2060
Suburbs around North Sydney
Crows Nest	Cammeray	Cammeray
Waverton	North Sydney	Neutral Bay
McMahons Point	Lavender Bay	Milsons Point

North Sydney is a suburb and commercial district on the Lower North Shore of Sydney, New South Wales, Australia, and is the administrative centre for the local government area of North Sydney Council.

== History ==
The Indigenous people on the southern side of Port Jackson (Sydney Harbour) called the north side warung which meant the other side, while those on the northern side used the same name to describe the southern side.

The first name used by European settlers was Hunterhill, named after a property owned by Thomas Muir of Huntershill (1765–1799), a Scottish political reformer. He purchased land in 1794 near the location where the north pylon of the Sydney Harbour Bridge is now located, and built a house which he named after his childhood home. This area north of Gore Hill became known as St Leonards. The township of St Leonards was laid out in 1836 in what is now North Sydney, bounded by what are now Miller, Walker, Lavender and Berry streets. By 1846 there were 106 houses here and by 1859, the commercial centre had extended from Milsons Point to Miller Street. A bus service operated by Jeremiah Wall ran between Milsons Point and North Sydney Shops, and North Sydney thus developed its own identity.

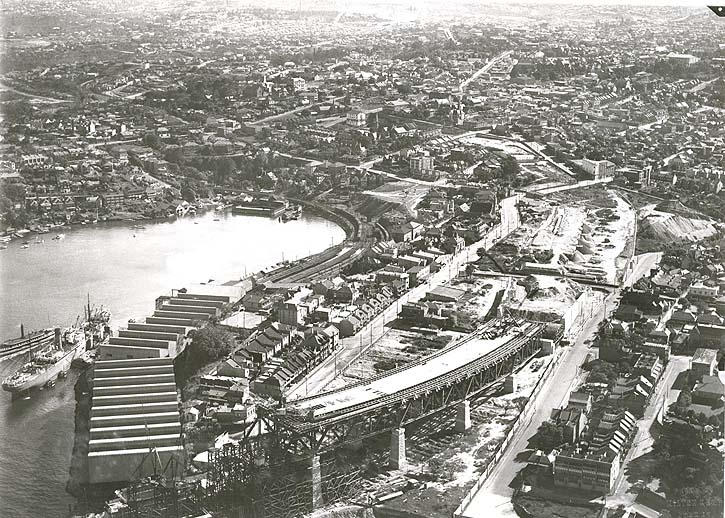
Aerial view of North Sydney during construction of the Sydney Harbour Bridge

The North Sydney municipality was incorporated in 1890 and after naming disputes, North Sydney was settled upon. The post office which opened in 1854 as St Leonards was changed to North Sydney in 1890. The first public school which opened in 1874 as St Leonards was renamed North Sydney in 1910.

North Sydney underwent a dramatic transformation into a commercial hub in 1971–72. In this period no less than 27 skyscrapers were built.

=== Trams ===
The history of the North Sydney tramway system can be divided into three periods – the first from the original opening in 1886 to 1909, when the McMahons Point line opened. The second period covers the time until the Wynyard line was opened across the Sydney Harbour Bridge in 1932, and the third until construction of the Cahill Expressway on the eastern side of Sydney Harbour Bridge and the wider closure of the system in 1962.

The first part of the North Sydney tramway system was a double-track cable tramway which commenced at the original Milsons Point ferry wharf, located where the north pylon of the Harbour Bridge is now. The line originally extended via Alfred Street (now Alfred Street South), Junction Street (now Pacific Highway), Blue Street and Miller Street to the Ridge Street Tram Depot. It used cable grip cars called "dummies" and un-powered trailer cars.

A feature of these lines was the underground tram terminus at Wynyard railway station (the only one in Australia), and the tracks over the Sydney Harbour Bridge. Trams ran from Blue Street over a now-demolished steel arch bridge over the Harbour Bridge Roadway, then over the eastern side of the harbour bridge (now road lanes), through a tram platform at Milsons Point railway station, before descending underground into platforms 1 and 2 of Wynyard station.

== Heritage listings ==
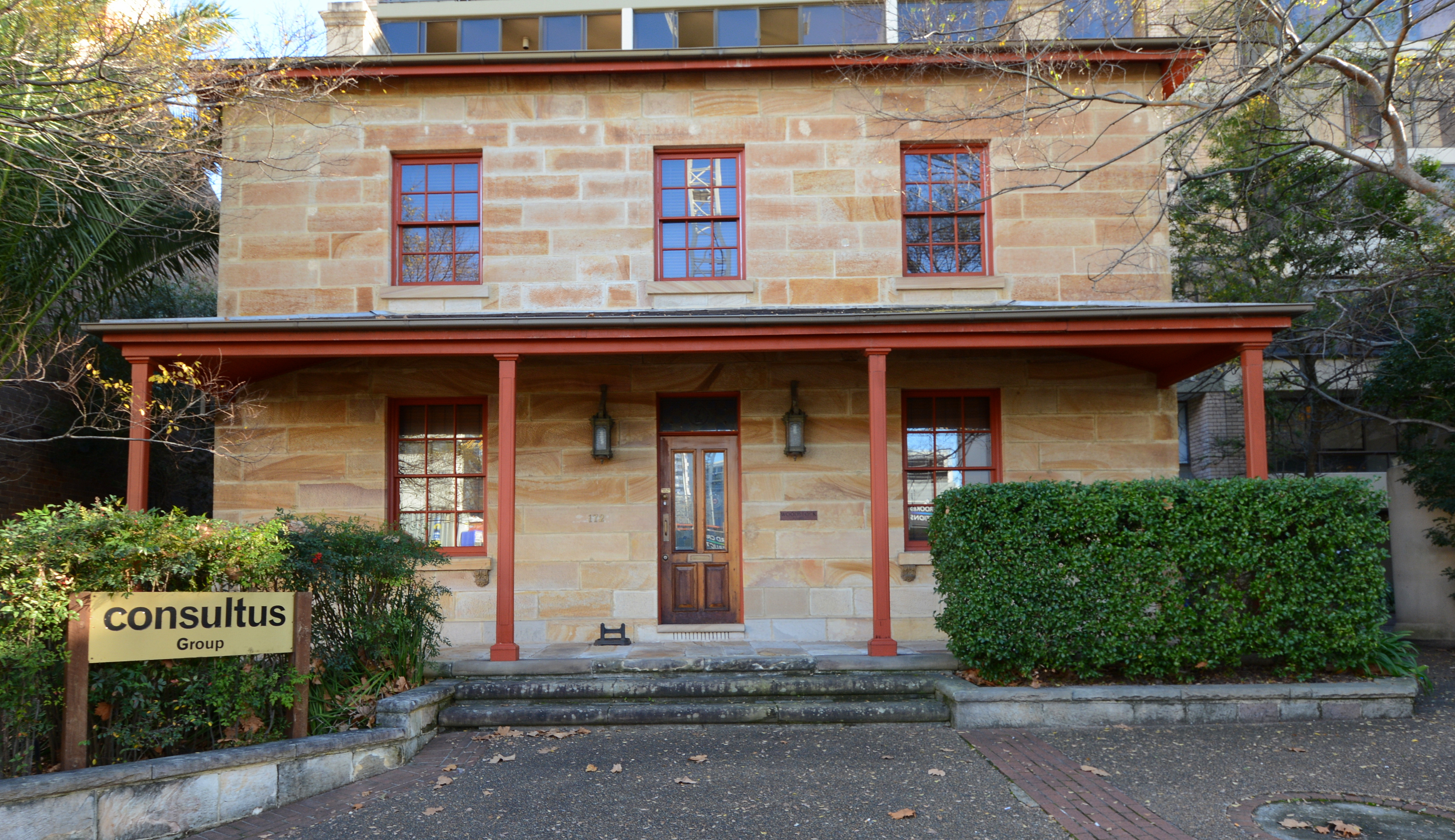
Woodstock (1870), one of the last 19th century homes on the Pacific Highway, was the home of John Brown, an early settler in the area

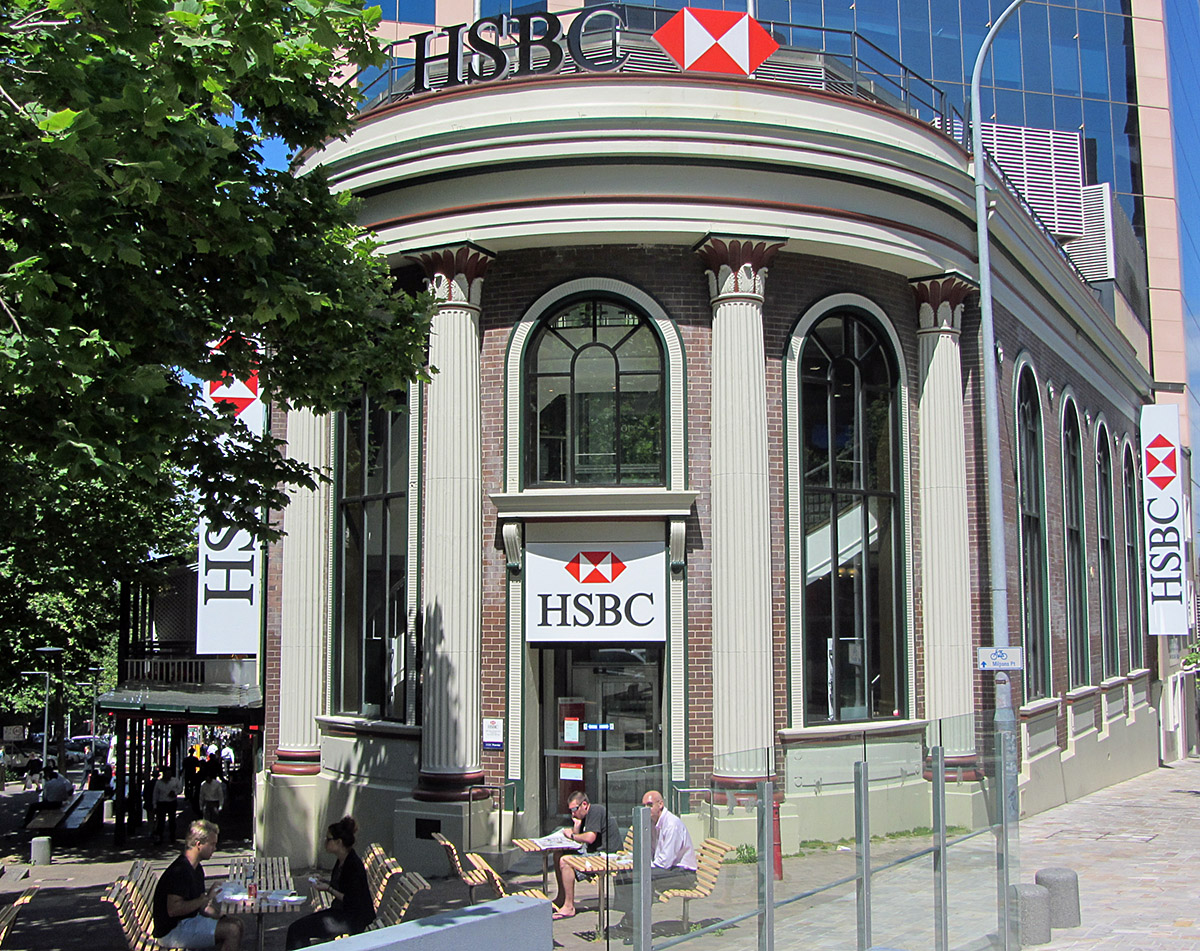
HSBC Building (built in 1931 as a Bank of New South Wales Branch)

North Sydney has a number of heritage-listed sites, including those listed on the New South Wales State Heritage Register:

- 36 Blue Street: Former North Sydney Technical High School (now Greenwood Hotel)
- 20 Edward Street: Graythwaite
- Falcon Street: North Sydney Sewer Vent
- 283a Miller Street: St Leonards Park
- 6 Napier Street: Don Bank
- 92–94 Pacific Highway: North Sydney Post Office
- 44 Union Street: Kailoa

The following buildings are heritage-listed on other heritage registers:

- Chinese Christian Church, Alfred Street
- Christ Church, Walker and Lavender Streets
- Church of England Rectory, Lavender Street
- Houses: 11–37 Walker Street and 20–30 Walker Street
- Mercedes, 9 Walker Street
- St Francis Xavier's War Memorial Church, Mackenzie Street
- St Francis Xavier's Presbytery, Mackenzie Street
- St Francis Xavier's Church School Hall, Mackenzie Street
- St Peter's Presbyterian Church and Manse, Blues Point Road
- St Thomas's Church of England, West and Church Streets
- St Thomas's Kindergarten Hall, Church and McLaren Streets
- St Thomas's Church Rectory, McLaren Street
- Woodstock, Pacific Highway

== Commercial area ==
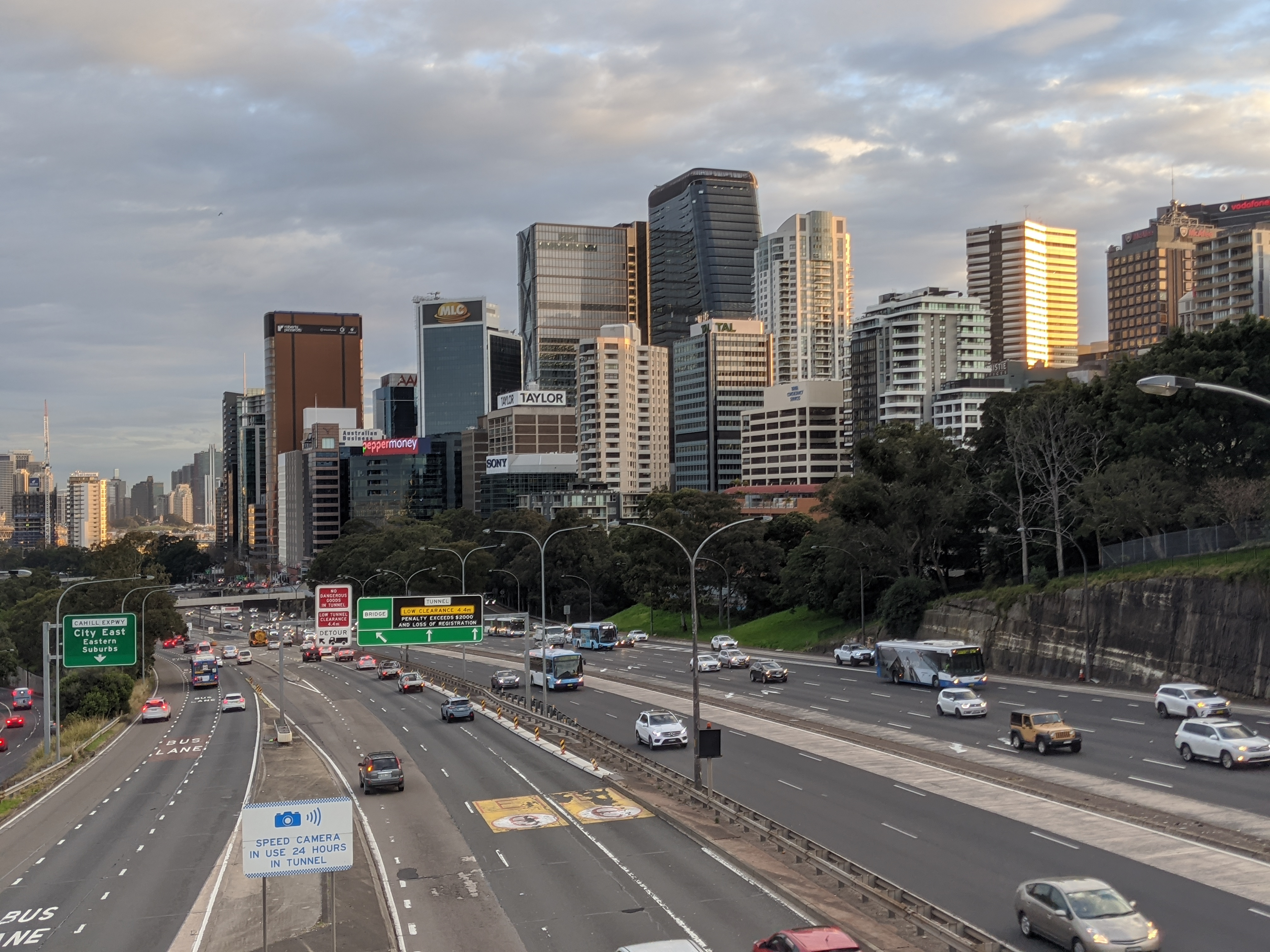
North Sydney's high-rise commercial district

Miller Street is the main commercial street in North Sydney. It is home to the North Sydney Council Chambers. In terms of banking, Miller Street is home to an ANZ Bank branch, a Commonwealth Bank branch, a National Australia Bank branch, and a Westpac branch.

The commercial district of North Sydney includes the second largest concentration of office buildings in New South Wales, with a large representation from the advertising and information technology industries. Advertising, marketing businesses and associated trades such as printing have traditionally dominated the business life of the area though these have been supplanted to a certain extent by information technology businesses. Corporations whose offices are in North Sydney include: AAMI, Acciona, AGL, CIMIC, Cisco, Coca-Cola Europacific Partners, Gen Digital, Hyundai, Microsoft, Nando's, National Australia Bank, NBN Co, Nine Entertainment, Novell, SAP, Sophos, Ventia, UGL, Vocus Communications, Vodafone and Zurich Insurance.

Unlike other major suburban hubs within the Sydney metropolitan area, North Sydney has limited shopping facilities and almost no Sunday trading. There are four supermarkets (Aldi, IGA, Coles and Woolworths Metro). The main shopping complex is the Greenwood Plaza, which is connected to North Sydney station. Berry Square is another shopping centre in Berry Street, formerly known as North Sydney Shopping World.

== Population ==
According to the 2021 census, there were 8,964 residents in the suburb of North Sydney. 46.9% of residents were born in Australia. The most common countries of birth were China 5.8%, England 5.4%, India 4.6%, New Zealand 2.4% and Hong Kong 1.8%. 61.6% of residents spoke only English at home. Other languages spoken at home included Mandarin 6.4%, Cantonese 3.2%, Spanish 2.0%, Hindi 1.7% and Korean 1.5%. The most common responses for religion in North Sydney were No Religion 43.9% and Catholic 19.9%.

== Transport ==
North Sydney is directly linked to the Sydney CBD by road and rail across the Sydney Harbour Bridge and Sydney Harbour Tunnel. North Sydney railway station is on the North Shore railway line of the Sydney Trains network. Bus services by Busways, CDC NSW and Keolis Northern Beaches operate through North Sydney, connecting train and bus services towards North Sydney's neighbouring suburbs as well as connecting train services to Richmond via City from the T1 North Shore & Northern Lines. The Warringah Freeway links North Sydney south to the Sydney CBD and north to Chatswood. High Street, North Sydney wharf is a wharf served by Neutral Bay ferry services, which is part of the Sydney Ferries network. It is possible to walk from parts of North Sydney to the city centre in less than 30 minutes, by way of the Sydney Harbour Bridge.

Victoria Cross metro station, located two blocks north of the existing North Sydney heavy rail station, opened in August 2024 as part of the Sydney Metro City & Southwest project.

== Places of worship ==
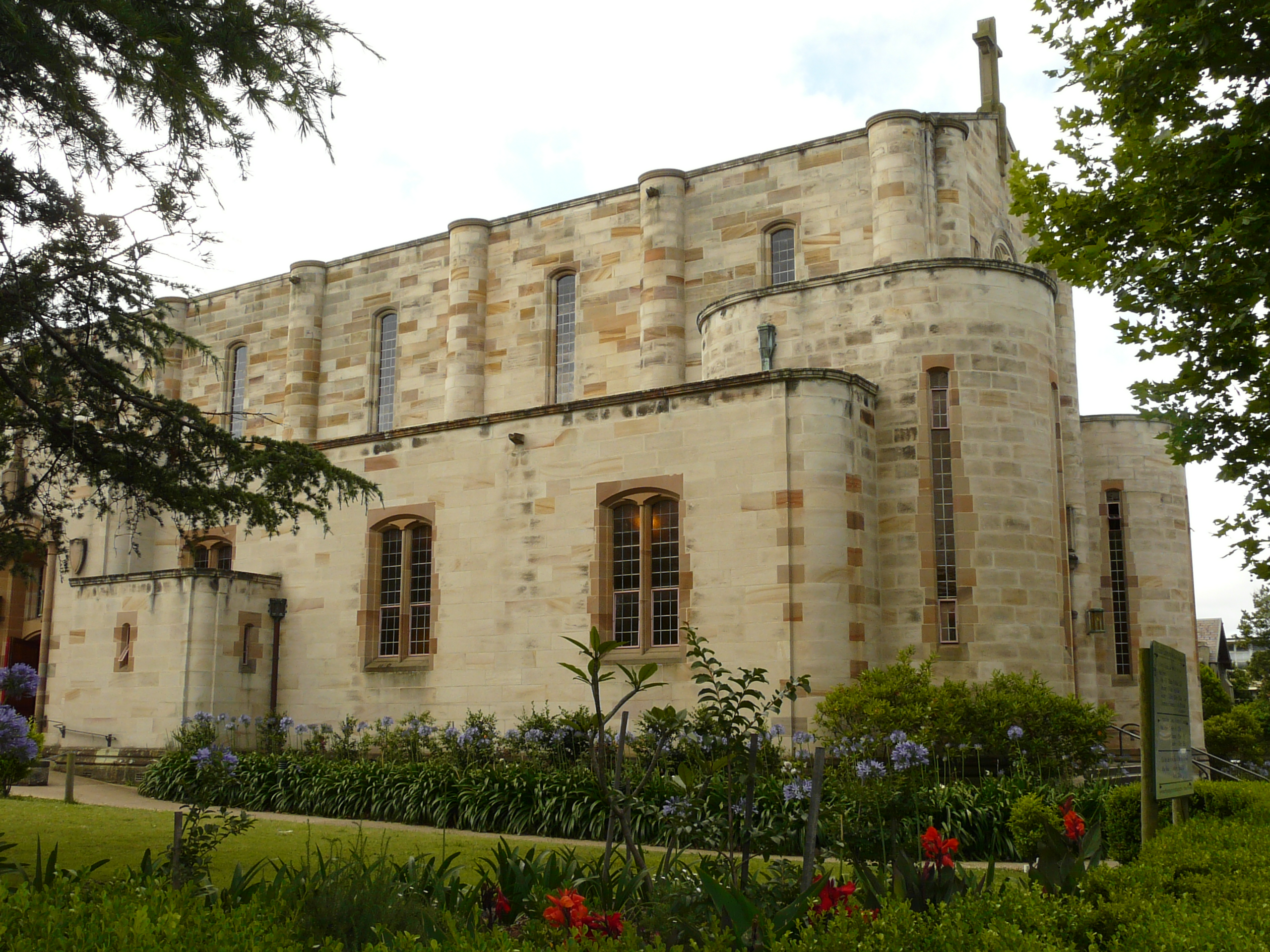
St Mary's Church

Churches include St Mary's Catholic Church on Miller Street, St Francis Xavier's War Memorial Church in Mackenzie Street, St Thomas Anglican Church on West and Church Streets, Christ Church on Walker and Lavender Streets, St Peter's Presbyterian Church and Manse on Blues Point Road and Chinese Christian Church on Alfred Street.

Hare Krishna Temple is located on the corner of Falcon Street and Miller Street.

== Schools ==
Primary schools include North Sydney Demonstration School, Mosman Preparatory School and St Marys Primary School.

High schools include the public North Sydney Boys High School and North Sydney Girls High School, the Catholic Marist Catholic College North Shore, and independent schools Wenona School, Monte Sant' Angelo Mercy College and Sydney Church of England Grammar School (Shore).

St Aloysius' College of Milsons Point and Loreto Kirribilli are also within the confines of the North Sydney local government area. Post-secondary education providers include the Australian Catholic University, APM College of Business and Communication, Raffles College of Design and Commerce, Walker and Miller Training and Billy Blue College of Design.

== Landmarks ==
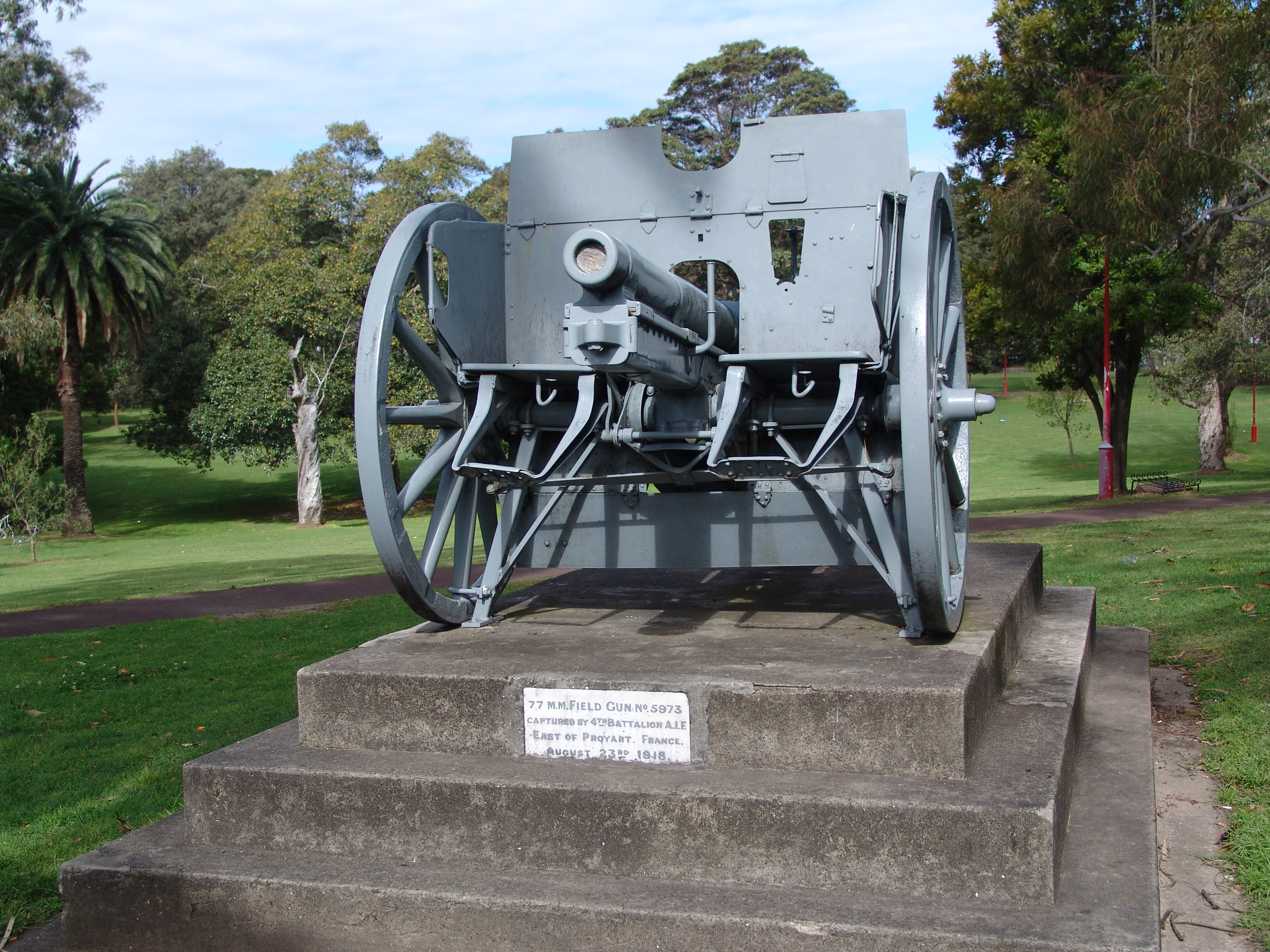
A WWI German Field Gun in St Leonards Park. The State War Trophy Committee allocated the gun to Council in 1921. It was unveiled by Major-General Sir Granville Ryrie.

- MLC Building
- North Sydney Post Office
- North Sydney Oval
- Stanton Library
- Brett Whiteley Square
- Museum at Mary MacKillop Place, which tells the story of Australia's first Catholic saint
- Don Bank Museum, devoted to the history of the local area
- Greenwood Plaza shopping complex (built under the former public school, founded in 1878 and renamed after its Principal)
- North Sydney railway station
- Victoria Cross railway station
- Independent Theatre
- Walker Street Cinema (closed)

== Sport and recreation ==
St Leonards Park which includes North Sydney Oval is the suburb's major recreation area, popular among joggers and those wishing to walk their dogs. Since 1910, North Sydney Oval has played host to the North Shore's leading sports team the North Sydney Bears, who play in the NSW Cup, the second grade below NRL level. The Bears were excluded from the NRL after the 1999 season as a result of the Super League war peace deal in which the number of clubs had to be reduced to 14 by the 2000 season. There have been ongoing efforts to restore the Bears. The first proposal was the Central Coast Bears, and the most recent was a proposed partnership with Western Australia to form the Perth Bears. All bids have included a proposal to play one game at North Sydney Oval for heritage. Outside of the Bears, the stadium also hosts the Northern Suburbs Rugby Club, and the North Sydney Cricket Club for local Rugby Union and Cricket respectively

The Norths Pirates Junior Rugby Union Club is North Sydney's local junior village rugby union team who play all home games at Tunks Park in the adjoining suburb of Cammeray together with North Sydney Brothers, a junior rugby league club and the rugby league teams of Marist College North Shore.

- North Sydney Bears (rugby league team based in the area)
- North Sydney Cricket Club
- North Sydney Chess Club
- Norths Pirates Junior Rugby Union
- Northern Suburbs Rugby Club
- UTS Northern Suburbs Athletic Club
- Gordon-North Sydney Hockey Club
- North Sydney Symphony Orchestra

During the 2000 Summer Olympics, the city was the starting point of the marathon course that would end 26.2 mi (42.2 km) later at the Olympic Stadium in Homebush Bay.

== Notable people ==
- Billy Blue, convict after whom several places were named, such as Blues Point
- Arthur Bollard, rugby league player
- Theodora Cowan, Australia's first locally-born woman sculptor, was living at 84 Berry Street when she died
- Paul Cuneo, rugby league player
- Sid Deane, rugby league player
- Lachlan Fitzgibbon, rugby league player
- Antonella Gambotto-Burke, author, born at the Mater Hospital, North Sydney
- Sienna Green (born 2004), water polo Olympian
- Joe Hockey, former Treasurer of Australia, Member of Parliament for North Sydney from 1996 until 2015.
- Henry Lawson, poet and short-story author
- David McKay, journalist and racing driver
- Kel Nagle, golfer, won the 1960 Open Championship
- Peter Taylor, test cricketer

== Governance ==
The local government area of North Sydney Council includes the suburb of North Sydney and the surrounding suburbs of Crows Nest, Waverton, Neutral Bay, McMahons Point, Kirribilli, Cremorne (divided between North Sydney and Mosman) and Cammeray.

This suburb has been included in the House of Representatives division of Warringah since 2025. It had been included in the now abolished electorate of North Sydney since Federation. Its local Member of Parliament has been Zali Steggall since May 2025.

This suburb is included in the electoral division of North Shore at the state level. The current member for this electorate is Felicity Wilson of the Liberal Party.

== Gallery ==
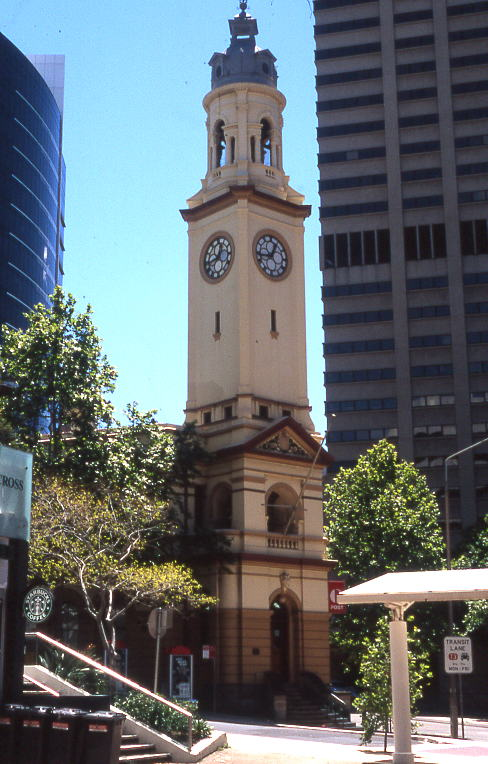
North Sydney Post Office

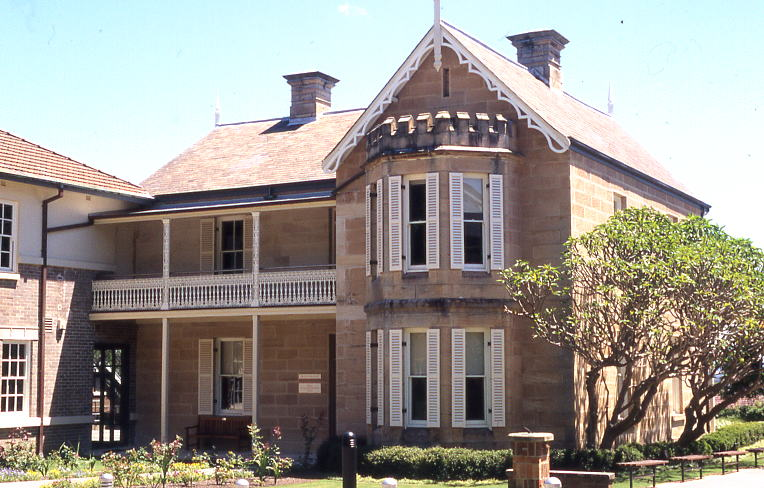
Upton Grange, designed by William Wardell

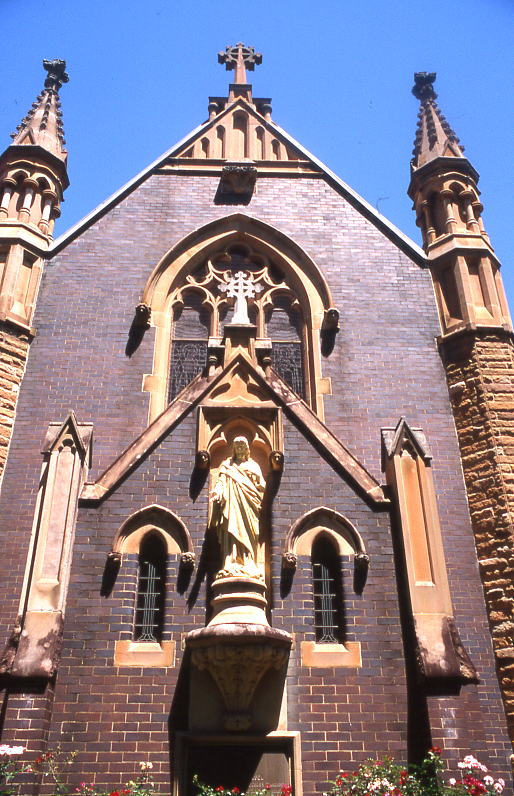
Mary Mackillop Memorial Chapel, Mount Street

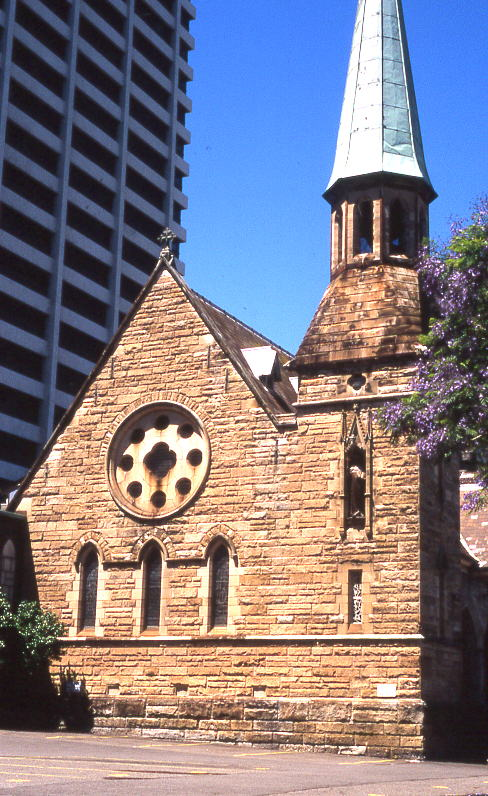
St Francis Xavier Church

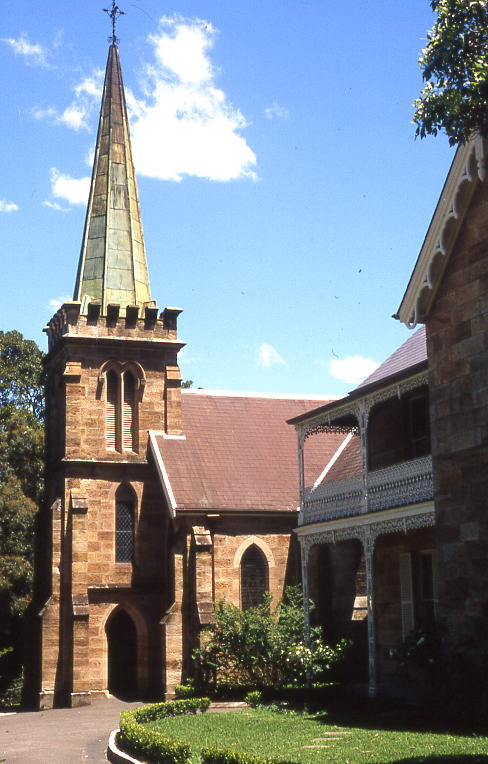
St Peter's Church

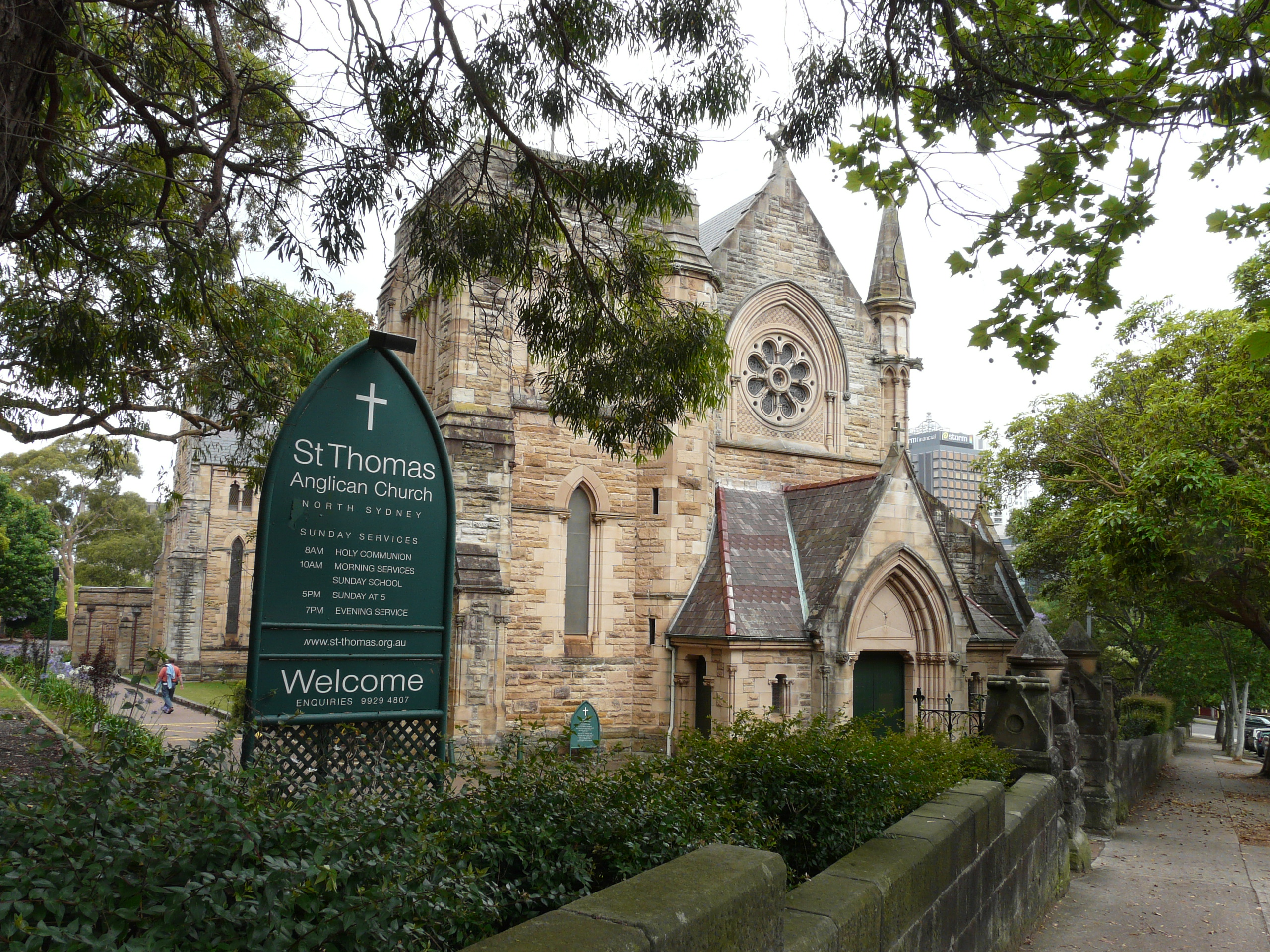
St Thomas's Church

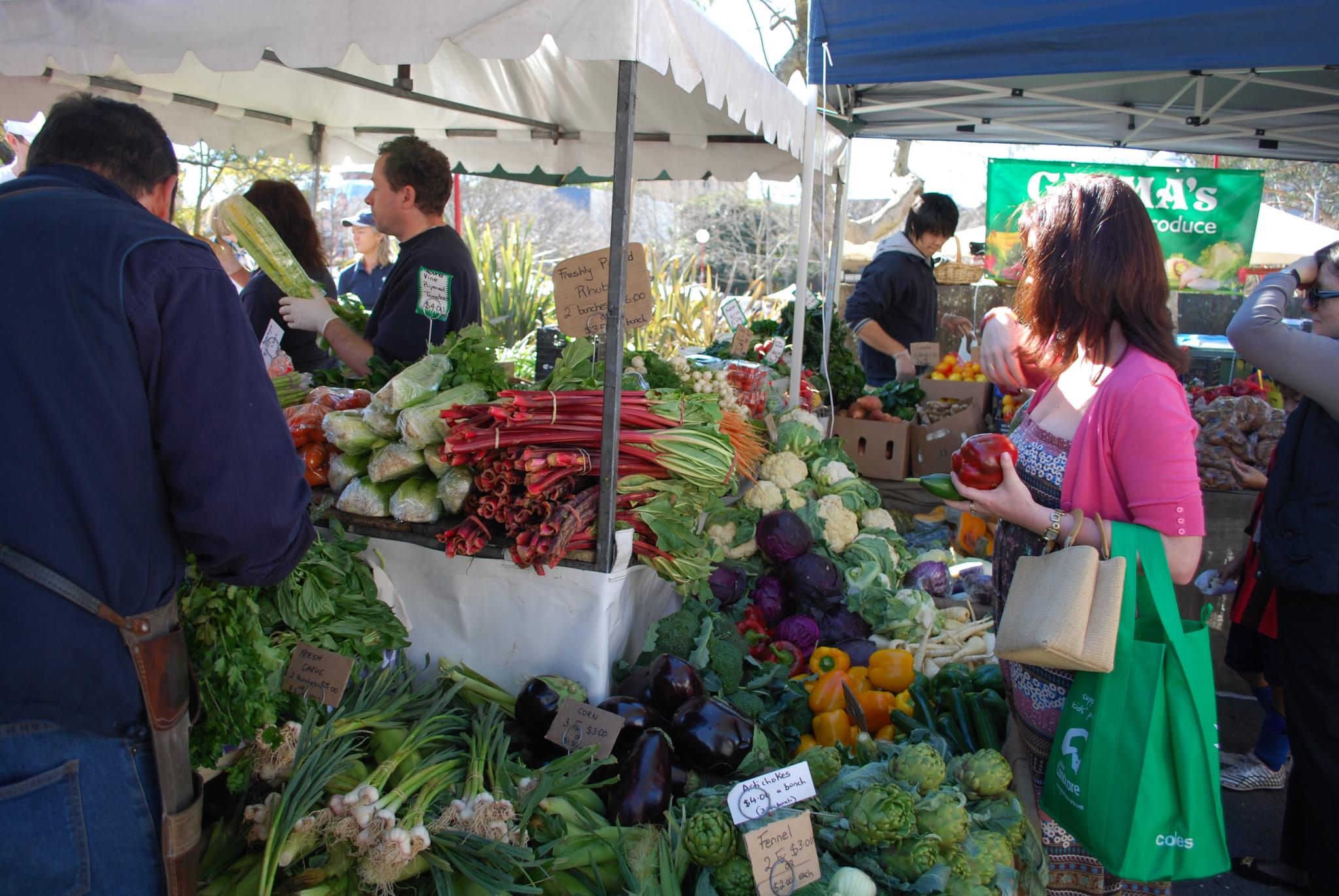
North Sydney farmers market

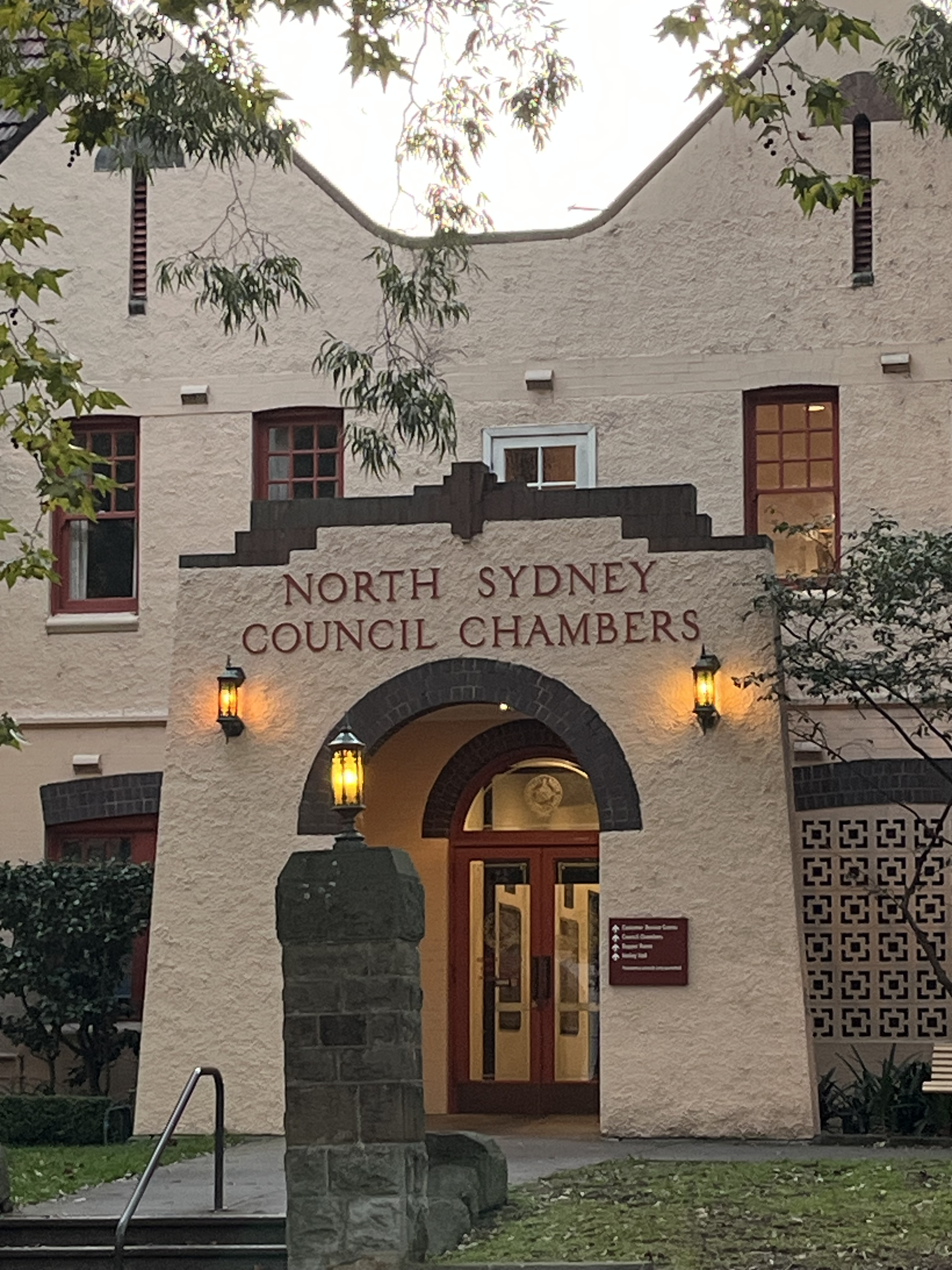
North Sydney Council Chambers

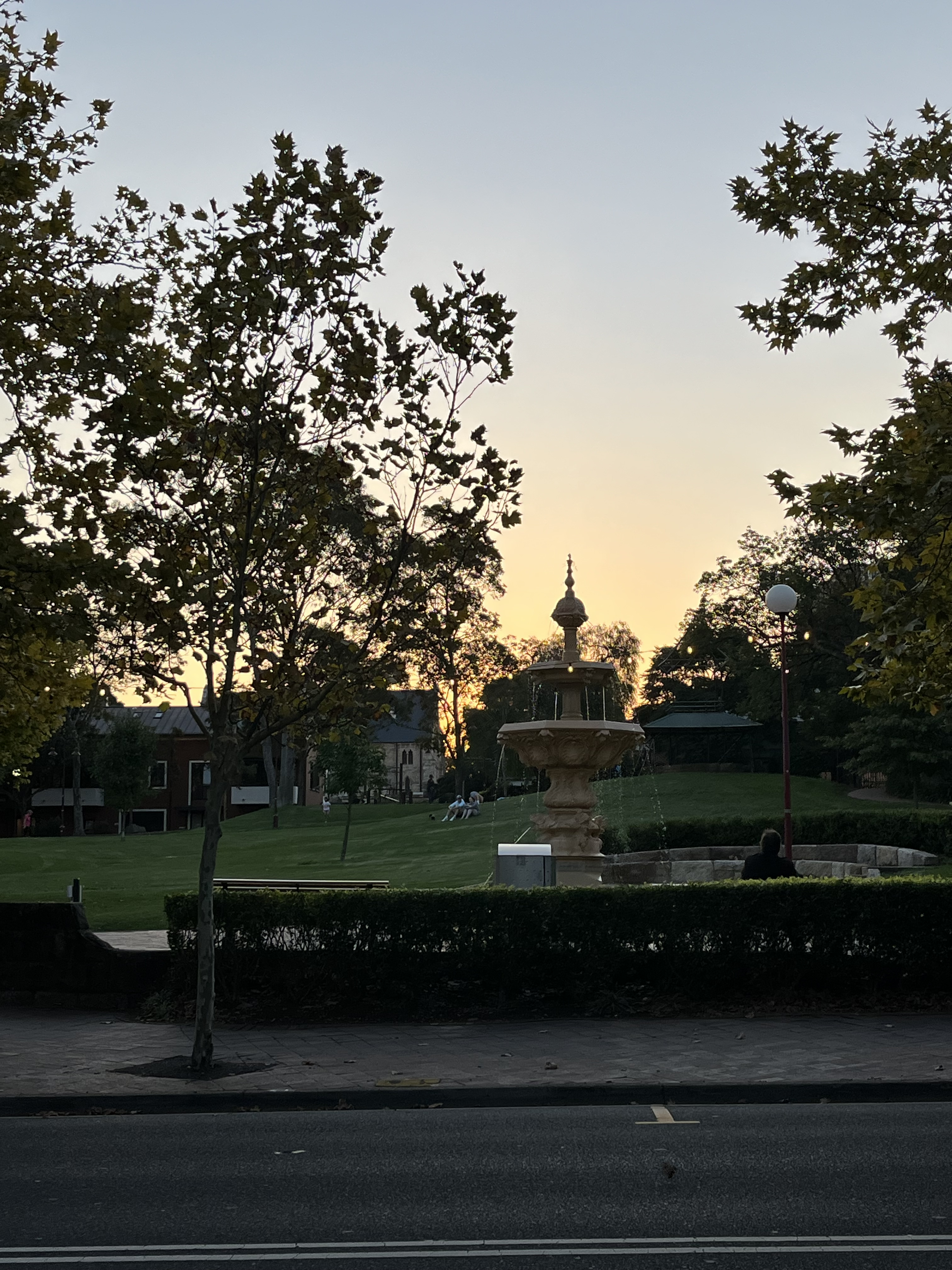
Ted Mack Civic Park
