= North Sydney Post Office =

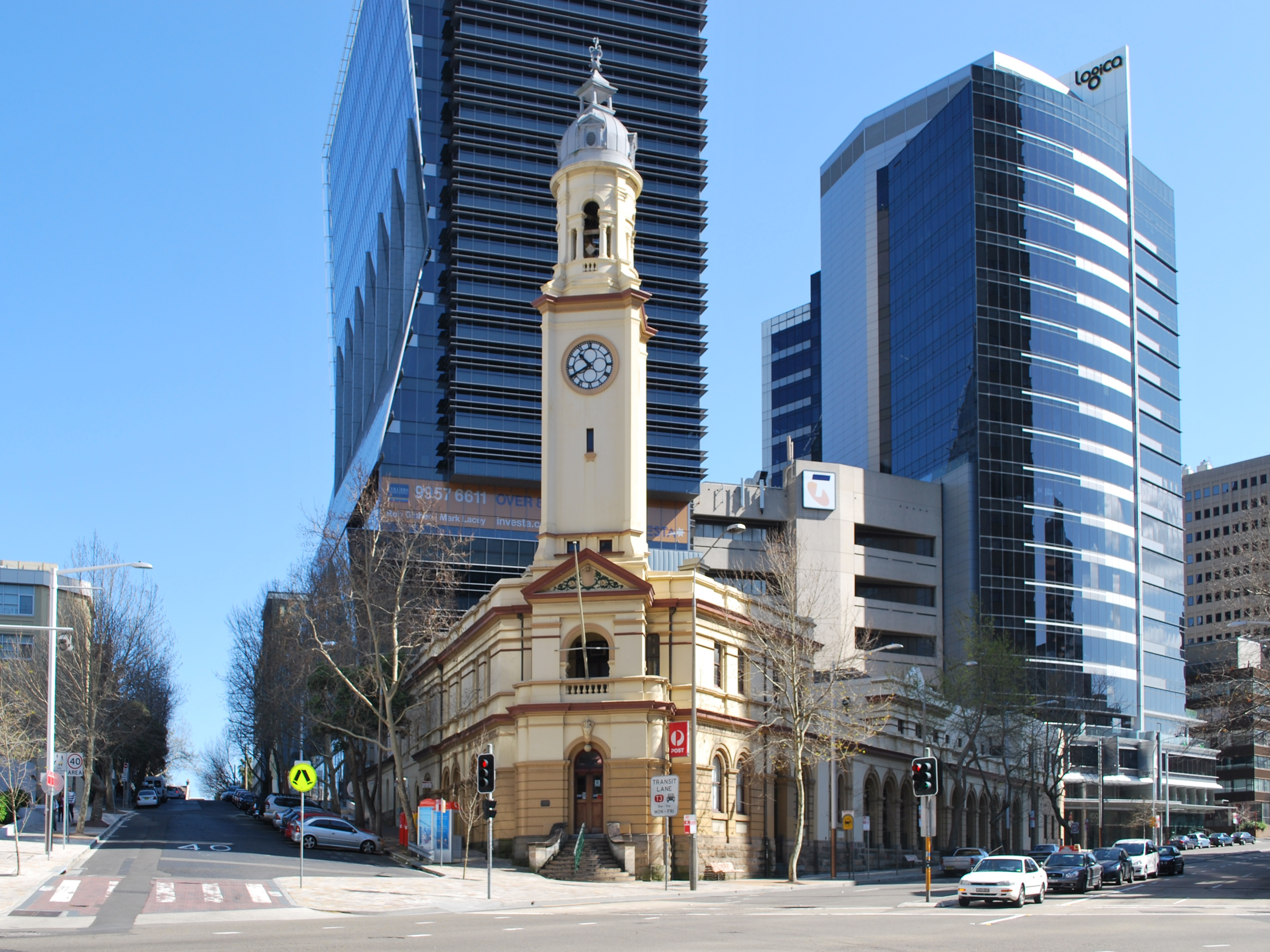
- North Sydney Post Office in 2010

- Location within Sydney Location within Australia
- 33°50′19″S 151°12′23″E
- Location: 92–94 Pacific Highway, North Sydney, North Sydney Council, New South Wales, Australia

History
- Built: 1885–1889

Site notes
- Architects: James Barnet; Colonial Architect’s Office
- Architectural style: Victorian Free Classical
- Owner: Australia Post

New South Wales Heritage Register
- Official name: North Sydney Post Office
- Type: State heritage (built)
- Designated: 22 December 2000
- Reference no.: 1417
- Type: Post Office
- Category: Postal and Telecommunications
- Builders: James Reynolds

The North Sydney Post Office is a heritage-listed post office located at 92–94 Pacific Highway, North Sydney, North Sydney Council, New South Wales, Australia. It was designed by the Colonial Architect’s Office under the direction of James Barnet, and built from 1885 to 1889 by James Reynolds. The property is owned by Australia Post, an agency of the Australian Government. It was added to the New South Wales State Heritage Register on 22 December 2000.

== History ==
=== Background ===
The first official postal service in Australia was established in April 1809, when the Sydney merchant Isaac Nichols was appointed as the first postmaster in the colony of New South Wales. Prior to this, mail had been distributed directly by the captain of the ship on which the mail arrived; however, this system was neither reliable nor secure. In 1825 the colonial administration was empowered to establish a Postmaster General's Department, which had previously been administered from Britain.

In 1828 the first post offices outside of Sydney were established, with offices in Bathurst, Campbelltown, Parramatta, Liverpool, Newcastle, Penrith and Windsor. By 1839 there were forty post offices in the colony, with more opened as settlement spread. During the 1860s, the advance of postal services was further increased as the railway network began to be established throughout New South Wales. In 1863, the postmaster general, W. H. Christie, noted that accommodation facilities for postmasters in some post offices was quite limited, and stated that it was a matter of importance that "post masters should reside and sleep under the same roof as the office".

The first telegraph line was opened in Victoria in March 1854 and in New South Wales in 1858. The New South Wales colonial government constructed two lines from the GPO, one to the South Head Signal Station, the other to Liverpool. Development was slow in New South Wales compared to the other states, with the Government concentrating on the development of country offices before suburban ones. As the line spread, however, telegraph offices were built to accommodate the operators. Unlike the post office, the telegraph office needed specialised equipment and could not be easily accommodated in a local store or private residence. Post and telegraph offices operated separately until January 1870 when the departments were amalgamated, after which time new offices were built to include both postal and telegraph services. In 1881 the first telephone exchange was opened in Sydney, three years after the first tests in Adelaide. As with the telegraph, the telephone system soon began to extend into country areas, with telephone exchanges appearing in country New South Wales from the late 1880s onwards. Again the post office was responsible for the public telephone exchange, further emphasising its place in the community as a provider of communications services.

The appointment of James Barnet as Acting Colonial Architect in 1862 coincided with a considerable increase in funding to the public works program. Between 1865 and 1890 the Colonial Architects Office was responsible for the building and maintenance of 169 Post Offices and telegraph offices in New South Wales. The post offices constructed during this period featured in a variety of architectural styles, as Barnet argued that the local parliamentary representatives always preferred "different patterns".

The construction of new post offices continued throughout the Depression years under the leadership of Walter Liberty Vernon, who held office from 1890 to 1911. While twenty-seven post offices were built between 1892 and 1895, funding to the Government Architect's Office was cut from 1893 to 1895, causing Vernon to postpone a number of projects.

Following Federation in 1901, the Commonwealth Government took over responsibility for post, telegraph and telephone offices, with the Department of Home Affairs Works Division being made responsible for post office construction. In 1916 construction was transferred to the Department of Works and Railways, with the Department of the Interior responsible during World War II.

On 22 December 1975, the Postmaster General's Department was abolished and replaced by the Post and Telecommunications Department. This was the creation of Telecom and Australia Post. In 1989, the Australian Postal Corporation Act established Australia Post as a self-funding entity, heralding a new direction in property management, including a move away from the larger more traditional buildings towards smaller shop front style post offices.

For much of its history, the post office has been responsible for a wide variety of community services including mail distribution, an agency for the Commonwealth Savings Bank, electoral enrolments, and the provision of telegraph and telephone services. The town post office has served as a focal point for the community, most often built in a prominent position in the centre of town close to other public buildings, creating a nucleus of civic buildings and community pride.

=== North Sydney Post Office ===
The first post office in North Sydney was opened on 1 May 1854, trading under the name of St Leonards, the official name for the area until 1890. Mr G. H. Stevens was appointed first postmaster in 1854 with an annual salary of £12, retiring in 1870 due to deteriorating health. The St Leonards post office serviced a large area of the lower North Shore, and by 1874 it was recommended that a "Branch" post and telegraph office be established at North Shore, upgrading the current office to an official post office with telegraph facilities.

In that year both the Superintendent of Telegraphs and the Postal Inspector were requested to investigate appropriate sites for a new post and telegraph office, as well as an estimated cost for the laying of telegraph cable across the harbour. This initial investigation for a post office site began a ten-year saga for the Postmaster General in North Sydney.

The Postal Inspector first advised of suggestions from both the Mayor of East St Leonards, and the Mayor of St Leonards that the site of the Police Station would be the most suitable site for a Post and Telegraph Office. This proposal was firmly rejected by the Inspector General of Police and so the PMG decided to advertise for other premises. Advertisements were then placed in the Sydney Morning Herald and the Empire on 11 November 1874. Postal Inspector Moyse recommended that an official office be located close to the existing office in Mount Street, as this would make it central to the three municipalities of East St Leonards, St Leonards and Victoria.

In response to the advertisements, many people in and around North Sydney made offers to sell or rent property to the department. During the search for a permanent site (from June 1876) it was decided to rent the property of Mrs Jane Glover, for £2 per week. Her premises was situated at the junction of Blues Point and Lane Cove roads, and Mount and Miller streets opposite the police station, and consisted of a newly erected store and dwelling house of seven rooms.

A joint report on North Sydney Post Office was submitted by four postal inspectors in June 1876, recommending that the Government should erect a suitable building for a post office. The department agreed to put money on the Parliamentary estimates committee for a new office, but was advised by the Council Clerk that the only portion of land available within the Municipality dedicated for public use was the wharf at Blues Point. The Clerk further advised that the most suitable piece of land available was owned by Hon. F. Lord, being centrally located with a frontage to both Miller and Walker Streets of 110 metres (350 ft), and a frontage of 150 metres (500 ft) to Blue Street. The department advised that it did not consider the purchase of such a large site to be necessary.

Between 1876 and November 1877, the department was offered thirteen separate sites for purchase around North Sydney for the erection of a new Post Office ranging in both size and price. In November 1877, two senior officers recommended the purchase of a parcel of land owned by W. G. Matthews with frontage to Lane Cove Road be purchased. The land cost £375, with plans being drawn and £4,000 provided by the estimates committee for construction of the post office. However, before any work could begin, complaints were received by residents that the site was too isolated and so the project was put on hold.

In April 1880 a conference was held between the four interested municipalities to discuss the location for the post office. It was decided that the site of the local Watch House was the most appropriate plus a portion of Government land adjoining it, which had been promised to the St Leonards Council as a site for the town hall. It was also recommended that the watch house be moved to the post office site. When it became known that a new site was being looked for, more offers of land came to the department. A further five land offers were put to the department between 1880 and 1884 before a final decision was made.

Finally, in February 1884, the Postmaster General told Parliament that steps were being taken to appropriate the Government land upon which the School of the Arts stood. A few months later it was announced that the land that had been bought from Matthews had been given to the School of the Arts in exchange for the site that had been taken over. In February 1885 a tender was accepted from A. & F. Heinan for the erection of a combined Post Office, Court House and Police Station for £12,670. However following a dispute with Heinan, another builder, James Reynolds took over the contract at a reduced cost of £11,500. Twelve months after the start of work an inquiry into the condition of the Department of Public Works reported that, while the contract for the building was £11,500, the likely cost of the completed development would be closer to £17,000, which was an illustration of the "impropriety of erecting buildings on ill-adapted sites".

The three buildings were completed between 1886, which is the date for the courthouse, and 1889 when construction of the post office was finished. The office was ready for occupation on 31 January 1889, with the cost of the post office section being £4500. A clock was installed over the front entrance to the office, later being transferred into a new tower. The clock tower was built over the entrance in 1895 at a cost of £965, with the clock being installed in July 1900. Circular stairs were also installed to the front of the office during this time. The delay in installing the clock had been caused by the postmaster general recommending that if the residents wished for a clock in the tower, then they should contribute a third of the cost.

Little information is held in relation to work on the building between the early 1900s to the 1970s. During 1974–1975 the post office underwent a major renovation costing $233,870. During this process the entire interior was renovated with wood panelling and the counter extended to allow for more serving positions. A two-storey addition was to be built in place of the existing courtyard affording more working space on the ground and mezzanine levels. Within the new addition a parcel contractor's room, drive-in mail pick-up and delivery facilities and improved staff amenities were also added. The work was completed by November 1975.

In 1977 the exterior stonework was restored and repainted at a total cost of $80,000.

== Description ==
North Sydney Post Office is situated in a prominent position within the busy CBD of North Sydney. As part of a complex of buildings containing the Court House and Police Station, the building is a landmark feature within the surrounding streetscape. This complex is an important civic conservation group of late Victorian buildings which define the centre of North Sydney.

The post office is a two-storey Victorian Free Classical rendered brick building, with a four-and-a-half-storey corner clock tower. It has a complex hipped, skillion slate and corrugated steel roof, and the clock tower has a domed zinc roof with small dormers and a finial at the apex over an open sided bell room. Four rendered and moulded chimneys can be seen to punctuate the roof line behind the moulded parapet that extends along both street facades.

North Sydney Post Office is a rendered brick building painted cream and tan, with classically styled detailing and reddish brown trim. Detailing comprises moulded string courses, imitation blockwork, central pediment, arched windows, columns to the bell room and arched bays to the adjacent building. Additions to the building appear to have mainly occurred to the rear of the two-storey building towards William Street, comprising single-storey brick buildings currently used for storage of the higher rear dock area. This opens to the small rear yard accessed off William Street.

There is a small balcony off the first-floor corner facade below a pediment with a rendered balustrade. It has an asphalt lined floor, masonite or fibre cement sheet soffit, and a flagpole projecting from the centre. Ground-floor verandahs are to the post box areas and have grey masonite or fibre cement sheet soffits, grey tiled floor, brown tiled lower walls, fixed windows over the post boxes and attached fluorescent lights. Adjacent to the balcony is a small room accessing the clock tower via a series of four steel ladders. The various levels of the tower have timber boarded floors, painted English Bond brick walls and copper clad bell room floor. The disused clock mechanism is now powered by an electric motor and remains intact within the tower. The clock features four large black on white faces to each side.

Fenestration is uniform; window openings are symmetrical about the corner tower with regularly spaced openings beyond to each facade, especially considering the arched bays of the adjacent Court House. There are narrow single upper and lower pane sash windows to the entry foyer, two pane upper and lower sash windows to the retail area with arched top sashes and modern windows to later rear additions.

The ground-floor of North Sydney Post Office consists of four main areas. These include the carpeted large front retail area, central mail room and offices and post box areas. Ceilings to this floor are plasterboard to the post boxes areas and retail area with a coved cornice. There is board and batten to the rear section of the retail area and plaster to the front entry with a wide moulded cornice. Extensive air conditioning ducting on the ground-floor and first-floor is suspended, with modern pendant and fluoro lights.

Architraves and skirting partitions appear to have been installed at a later stage, while there are retained original openings and wall fabric. There is a cut render dado to the front entry foyer. The ground-floor has automatic front doors, glazed internal doors to the retail area and predominantly modern flush and security internal doors. There are plasterboard partitions to the retail area and post boxes area and paired columns to the front of the retail area. No fireplaces were evident to this floor.

The main stair accessing the complex of levels that make up North Sydney Post Office comprises polished turned timber posts and balusters and sheet vinyl floor with black edge strips. The early skirting is polished and there are carved brackets to the upper flight. The first-floor comprises four main areas. They include the front corner carpeted offices, tiled and vinyl floored staff facilities at the centre, carpeted mailroom with dock and post boxes area at the rear. There is an operational conveyor belt servicing the ground-floor in the mailroom. Ceilings to the first-floor are varied. They include plasterboard to the hall and suspended ceiling to the centre-partitioned office, cleaner's room, mailroom and dock. There are plaster ceilings to the other offices with coved cornices and a ceiling rose in the eastern front office. Lighting is both suspended and attached fluorescent tubing. Architraves partitions are later, with some original architraves on original openings. Skirting is later, plain, brown and narrow. The first-floor windows are generally two pane double hung sash windows, with some single upper and lower pane windows and two internal windows to the partitions of the centre office. There are modern fixed windows to the mailroom high in the wall and a skylight to the store room of the mail room.

Doors on the first-floor are a combination of predominantly modern flush doors and early French doors on the balcony and tower entry. Walls on the first-floor include partitions to the centre office, lunch room, locker rooms and cleaners room. The remaining walls are early rendered and painted brick with some timber veneer partitions at the stair landing to the mailroom. Walls on the bathrooms have a modern tiled fitout. Fireplaces on this floor are bricked in and the surrounds removed. North Sydney Post Office signage is limited to Post Office lettering on each facade at first-floor level and some standard Australia Post signs on the Mount Street facade.

North Sydney Post Office is located within the North Sydney CBD which is largely comprises multi storey predominantly modern buildings. Landscaping is limited to uniformly positioned plane trees within the concreted perimeter pavement.

=== Condition ===
As at 12 July 2001, The condition of North Sydney Post Office is generally good. However, there is some evidence of moisture damage and cracking to some ceilings of the upper floor and to the cornice of the ground-floor front entry.

North Sydney Post Office has undergone a series of changes to the interior with little remaining original fabric. The exterior appears largely intact, with sympathetic additions. North Sydney Post Office retains the features which make it culturally significant, such as the elegant clock tower, arcaded porches, and pedimented portico, along with its overall style, scale and form.

== Heritage listing ==
As at 12 July 2001, North Sydney Post Office is significant at a State level for its historical associations, strong aesthetic qualities and social value.

North Sydney Post Office is associated with the development of postal services in the North Sydney area from 1854. As such, the current Post Office is associated with the growth of the area during the mid-nineteenth century. North Sydney Post Office is historically significant because it is also associated with the development of communications services in the North Sydney (originally called St Leonards) area during the late nineteenth century, as the growing population required improved services.

North Sydney Post Office is also historically significant because it is associated with the New South Wales Colonial Architect's Office under James Barnet, which designed and maintained a number of post offices across New South Wales between 1865 and 1890.

North Sydney Post Office is aesthetically significant because it is a distinctive example of the Victorian Free Classical style, with strong visual appeal. It is located on a prominent corner site and makes a significant contribution to the streetscape of the North Sydney civic precinct, and, along with the adjoining Court House and Police Station, provides an insight in the earlier built form of the North Sydney CDB. This complex of civic buildings forms an important civic conservation group in North Sydney. The North Sydney Post Office is also considered to be significant to the community of North Sydney's sense of place. The North Sydney Post Office was listed on the New South Wales State Heritage Register on 22 December 2000 having satisfied the following criteria.

The place is important in demonstrating the course, or pattern, of cultural or natural history in New South Wales.

The North Sydney Post Office is associated with the development of postal services in the North Sydney area from 1854. As such, the current Post Office is associated with the growth of the area during the mid-nineteenth century. The North Sydney Post Office is also associated with the development of communications services in the North Sydney area (then known as St Leonards) during the late nineteenth century, as the growing population required an improved standard of service and facilities. The historical background to the choice of location of the post office provides an insight into the bureaucracy of the late nineteenth-century New South Wales Government Departments and their relationship with the local community. North Sydney Post Office is associated with the New South Wales Colonial Architect's Office under James Barnet, which designed and maintained a number of post offices across New South Wales between 1865 and 1890.

The place is important in demonstrating aesthetic characteristics and/or a high degree of creative or technical achievement in New South Wales.

North Sydney Post Office is aesthetically significant because it is a strong example of the Victorian Free Classical style, with strong visual appeal. The elegant clock tower features an enriched belfry in the Baroque manner, which forms a large part of the building's character.

It is located on a prominent corner site, and makes a significant contribution to the streetscape of the North Sydney civic precinct. Along with the adjoining courthouse and police station, the post office provides an insight in the earlier built form of the North Sydney CDB. This complex of buildings forms an important civic conservation group in the area, and defines the centre of the North Sydney CBD.

The place has a strong or special association with a particular community or cultural group in New South Wales for social, cultural or spiritual reasons.

As an important local landmark and the centre of communications for over a century, North Sydney Post Office is considered to be significant to the local community. North Sydney Post Office, as part of the Court House and Police Station complex, also defines a sense of place for residents of North Sydney.

The place has potential to yield information that will contribute to an understanding of the cultural or natural history of New South Wales.

The site has some potential to contain archaeological information which may provide data relating to the previous use of the site by the School of Arts and the evolution of the building and out-buildings associated with the use by the post office.

The place possesses uncommon, rare or endangered aspects of the cultural or natural history of New South Wales.

The design of North Sydney Post Office is considered unusual as part of the grouping of the post office, courthouse and police station as a late Victorian period civic complex is rare. The importance of this group in defining the "centre" of North Sydney also has rarity value.

The place is important in demonstrating the principal characteristics of a class of cultural or natural places/environments in New South Wales.

The North Sydney Post Office is a good example of the Victorian Free Classical style of architecture. It is part of the group of nineteenth-century post offices in New South Wales designed by the Colonial Architect's Office under James Barnet.

== See also ==
- Australian non-residential architectural styles
- List of post office buildings in New South Wales
