= St Leonards Park =

Park in North Sydney, Australia

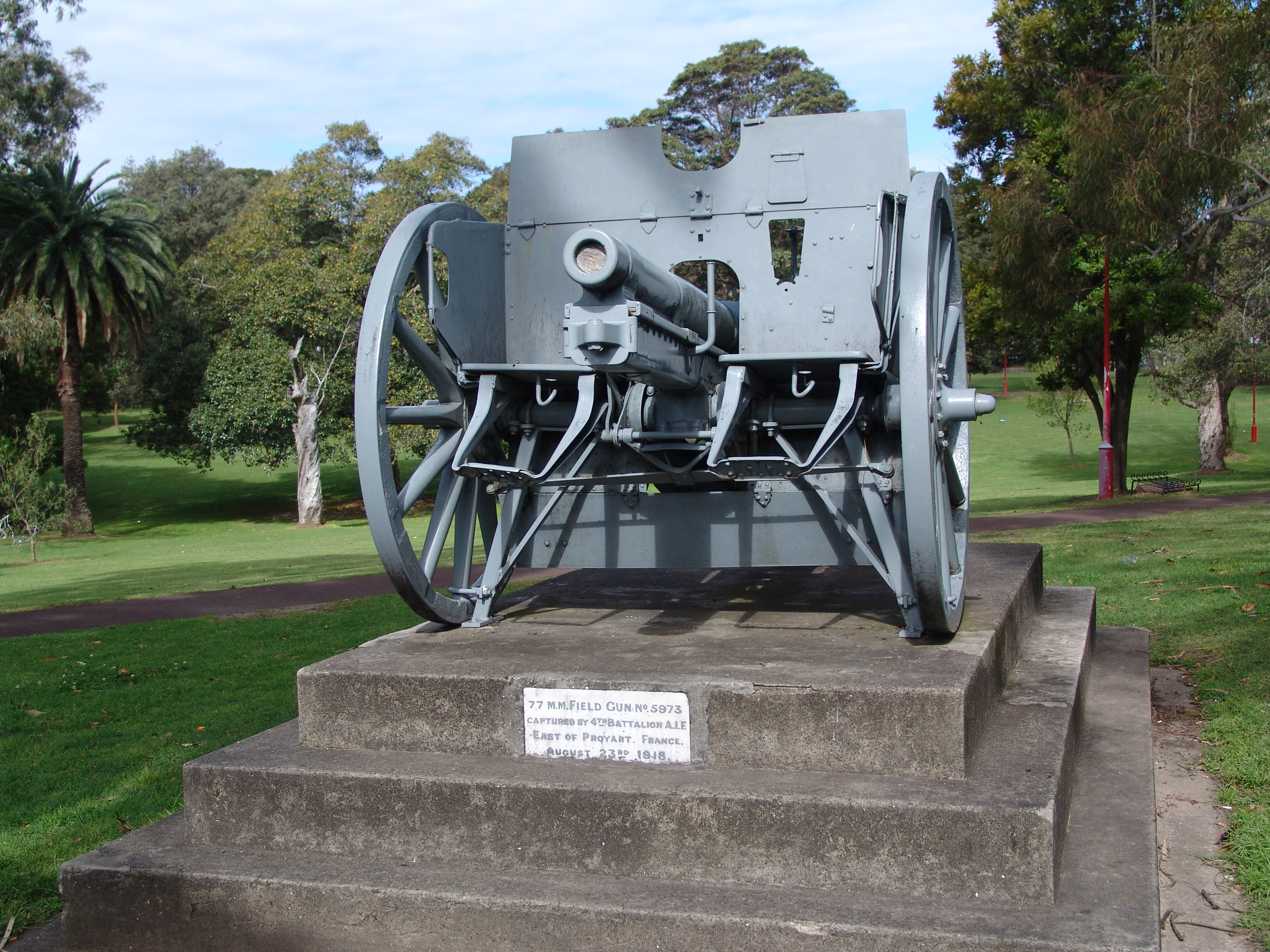
- WWI 77 mm (3.0 in) German Field Gun located in St Leonards Park
- Interactive map of St Leonards Park
- Type: Urban park
- Location: 283a Miller Street, North Sydney, North Sydney Council, New South Wales, Australia
- Coordinates: 33°49′52″S 151°12′38″E
- Area: 15 hectares (37 acres)
- Created: 1867 (as a park)
- Designer: Charles Moore
- Operator: North Sydney Council
- Website: www.northsydney.nsw.gov.au/Recreation_Facilities/Parks_Reserves/Search_Parks/St_Leonards_Park

History
- Built: 1838–

Site notes
- Architect(s): William Tunks, Mayor

New South Wales Heritage Register
- Official name: St Leonards Park
- Type: State heritage (landscape)
- Designated: 31 July 2015
- Reference no.: 1941
- Type: Urban Park
- Category: Parks, Gardens and Trees

St Leonards Park is a heritage-listed bowling club, 15-hectare (37-acre) urban park, rugby field and cricket oval at 283a Miller Street, North Sydney, North Sydney Council, New South Wales, Australia. It was designed by William Tunks, Mayor and built during 1838. It was added to the New South Wales State Heritage Register on 31 July 2015.

== History ==
=== Phase 1: Reserve alienation, 1838–1867 ===
The 16-hectare (40-acre) site for St Leonards Park was first identified and then gazetted when the original township of St Leonards was laid out in 1838. During this early phase, no development was undertaken other than a track which crossed diagonally across the park. A tributary of Willoughby Falls Creek ran across the site in the current location of the Music Shell and there was also a swamp near the existing Fig Tree Lane.

=== Phase 2: Park established, 1867–1900s ===
William Tunks, the first mayor of the newly created township of St Leonards, made it his first duty to have the public reserve dedicated as a public park in 1867 as a centrepiece for the new municipality. The first portion of land was dedicated in 1867 and set aside for public recreation and cricket, with the second section, not dedicated until 1869. The original cricket ground, now known as North Sydney Oval, was dedicated and the first pitch laid on 6 December 1867, making it one of the oldest continuously used cricket pitches in Australia. The first pavilion for spectators was constructed in 1879 on the south-western side of the oval and then replaced in 1909. This was further replaced in 1929 with the current Duncan Thompson Stand on the north western side of the oval. An Act of Parliament of New South Wales in 1879 gave the land its name St Leonards Park.

Mayor Tunks was very interested in the development of St Leonards Park and took a personal interest in its construction, attending to the location of pathways, the plantings of shrubs and trees, some even cultivated from his own garden. Local residents raised funds in 1873 for a perimeter fence and for further plantings of pines, camphor laurels and figs. The design was influenced by the English Public Parks Movement and Charles Moore, the Director of the Botanical Gardens, Sydney, as he promoted the use of Moreton Bay and Port Jackson figs in many parks across Sydney. The large fig trees in the formal avenue of Fig Tree Lane were most possibly planted at this time and were influenced by the middle-class practice of the leisurely promenade.

In 1883, Tunks suffered a fatal fall in the park. His memory is however, perpetuated on a Carrara marble fountain erected in his honour in 1885 with funds raised by the public. The fountain is still present today to the north of the War Memorial and is known as the Tunks Memorial Fountain.

Under the provisions of a by-law of the Public Parks Act of April 1884, North Sydney Council was given status as Trustee for St Leonards Park. In 1885, a number of citizens proposed that Council, as Trustee, grant space for the playing of bowls. The by-laws and the Local Government of New South Wales and Crown Lands Acts however, did not allow Council to lease parkland, only allowing Council to enter into renewable occupancy agreements. By May 1887 an area for a bowling green was gazetted with rules established by the Public Parks Branch of the Department of Mines (then the Department responsible for public parks) ensuring free access to the public when no sport was being played. The first annual general meeting was held in 1888, naming the club the St Leonards Bowling Club with the then Mayor of St Leonards, Captain Jenkins, as the first chairman.

The bowling club obtained a lease over the crown land in 1888.

In 1894, the Acting Under Secretary of Lands approved two areas for the playing of cricket and football totalling 2.3 hectares (5.7 acres) as well as a five-year licence for over 2,000 milliseconds (2.0 s) for a bowling club. A plan was created showing the outline of each area. The current Bon Andrews Oval is in the location of the space originally known as the "Football Ground" although the oval has been used for both cricket and football.

By 1886, the park was connected to the ferry terminal at Milsons Point by the tramway. The Jubilee Fountain was erected in 1897 to the north-east of the existing bowling club, in honour of the Diamond Jubilee of Queen Victoria. This fountain, however, was subsequently re-located to Civic Park between Stanton Library and the North Sydney Council Chambers in 1982.

The North Sydney Sewer Vent was constructed by the Metropolitan Board of Water Supply and Sewerage between 1891 and 1899. Originally designed to vent the reticulation system that took waste water from North Sydney and Mosman, it was located within St Leonards Park until it was separated by the construction of the Warringah Expressway.

=== Phase 3: Early twentieth century development, 1900–1930 ===
Australia's first outdoor cinema commenced operation at St Leonards Park in 1909 by opticians Osbourne & Jerdan. The screening of movies continue in 2014 by Sunset Cinemas after e being operated by Starlight Cinemas for the previous decade. After the First World War, North Sydney Council established a War Memorial Committee to raise funds and to identify a site for a memorial to commemorate the sacrifice made by the armed services. The site at the crest of Ridge St and the northern end of Walker St was chosen, along the park's central axis in direct alignment with the Tunks Memorial Fountain. The design, by Frank Thorp, a student working a Peddle Thorp and Walker, was chosen after a design competition and approved by the Public Monuments Advisory Board. The foundation stone was laid in 1924 for an Art Deco style 13-metre (43 ft) cenotaph made of Bowral trachyte and was unveiled in 1926. At the time of construction, it was visible from parts of Sydney Harbour and was the largest and most imposing war memorial in Sydney.

In 1921, the World War I German Field Gun allotted by the State War Trophy Committee was mounted on a pedestal in the north-west corner of St Leonards Park and unveiled by Major-General Sir Granville Ryrie.

Two tennis courts were constructed prior to 1930, on the site of the current playground. In 1904, the original grandstand at North Sydney Oval was replaced with a more substantial structure and in 1909 a low picket fence was constructed to enclose the oval after an agreement was reached between North Sydney Council, the NSW Rugby league football and Osbourne & Jerdan, the firm that conducted open-air picture shows on the Oval.

By 1924, Council awarded a prize to Mr F G Leslie Allen of Martin Place for the design of a brick grandstand. Now known as the Duncan Thompson Stand, it was the largest suburban grandstand in NSW at the time of its construction, seating 772 spectators. It was officially opened in 1928.

=== Phase 4: Inter-war and early post-war years, 1930s–1960s ===
During the early 1930s, St Leonards Park was a site for various government established work projects to create jobs. A Works Depot was constructed at this time near North Sydney Oval and rusticated stone work fences with a rough concrete finish were constructed.

A playground was established on the original tennis court site during the 1930s and included rows of swings and climbing equipment. By the 1940s, the park's activities had been extended to included dance and drama programmes, as well as sporting events. The playground was staffed by the Leadership Training College where Mr Edgar Herbert was the principal, a leading Australian authority on physical training and children's development. The area was to become a model community centre but was never achieved by Herbert, due to the advent of World War II and the death of Herbert in 1948.

Ornamental gardens were planted near Miller Street with the name St Leonards Park formed by planted garden beds. World War II also resulted in the construction of slit air raid trenches in a zig-zag pattern across the northern area of the park as well as near the War Memorial. These were later in-filled in 1944. A stone gazebo, constructed for the "Old Age and Invalid Pensioners" was constructed with funding from the Department of Local Government and Housing using rock faced stone and a terracotta tile roof.

In 1948 the Music Shell, designed by Peddle Thorp and Walker was completed and officially opened on 13 November by the Honorable Clive R Evatt, Minister for Housing with an audience of 4000 watching to a performance by the Sydney Symphony Orchestra and the North Shore Choral Society. A brick wall was constructed around North Sydney Oval during 1936, resulting in the removal of a double avenue of Moreton Bay figs along the Miller St frontage. This wall was to enclose the oval and to allow concrete terrace style seating for 1200 people.

The Cunningham Pavilion was constructed at the Bon Andrews Oval in 1930. Queen Elizabeth II and Philip, Duke of Edinburgh drove through St Leonards Park in front of 48,000 school children on 18 February 1954. A plaque set in sandstone is located in a low stone wall opposite Carlow St, facing Miller St within the Park to commemorate the occasion.

=== Phase 5: Post-war boom, 1960s–present ===
The construction of the Warringah Expressway altered the eastern boundary of the park, with the resumption of 1.2 hectares of parkland and the separation of the Sewer Vent from the park. Grass netball courts were constructed during the 1960s to the south of the bowling club near Ridge St for use primarily by local schools. An additional two asphalted courts were constructed in 1992.

In 1960, the North Sydney Leagues Bowling Club was granted a special lease 1960/227 for perpetuity to exclusive occupation upon the Crown Land. Council's trusteeship was terminated. Approval for a new clubhouse was given, financed and constructed by the Club. The Club also received an additional 1.4 hectares of land for car parking and for a larger clubhouse. The club house building was built in 1960-61 after approval on 11 October 1960.

In 1984, the Bob Stand was relocated from the Sydney Cricket Ground to North Sydney Oval. Originally constructed in 1895, it is a fine late nineteenth century shelter covering tiers of seating.

On 10 February 1984 there was a land exchange involving North Sydney Council exchanging the car park (532.6 sq.m) to the south of the bowling club houe for equal areas of land to the north and east of the bowling greens to be transferred back to being part of St. Leonards Park.

The Sydney 2000 Olympic Games Marathon event on 1 October 2000 commenced outside St Leonards Park with spectators viewing from the Park. The starting line painted across Miller St, North Sydney is still visible today adjacent to the Park. A 42.2-kilometre (26.2 mi) blue line was painted along Miller St to mark the course of the Marathon, across the Sydney Harbour Bridge, to finish at the Olympic Stadium.

North Sydney Oval continues to be used for local, regional and interstate sporting events. A record crowd of 23,089 was set in 1994 for a match between North Sydney and the Manly Sea Eagles.

DA 81/12 in 2012 proposed alterations to the bowling club house to provide office accommodation for the RSL sub-branch. The application was granted consent on 4/4/2013. Unauthorised paving was carried out, prior to 21 November 2014, to part of the northern bowling green and the use of this paved area for the service of alcohol and outdoor dining.

In September 2016 the NSW Land & Environment Court upheld an appeal against North Sydney City Council's deemed refusal of DA78/16 for the internal refurbishment of the main bowling club house; to provide extra toilets; continued use of part of the most-northern green and specify hours of operation and patron no's for the NSBC subject to conditions.

In 2018 it was announced that North Sydney Council would commence an upgrade of the park including improving the war memorial with a reflection pool, restoration of the Tunks Fountain and elevation on a new plinth, new benches, picnic tables, barbecues and drinking fountains, upgrades to lighting, additional tree planting, and an expanded playground.

In 2021, the southeastern section of the park adjacent to the Warringah Expressway was fenced off to the public. This will form a northern portal of the future Western Harbour Tunnel connecting the area to Rozelle.

== Description ==
St Leonards Park is a nineteenth century area of parkland that covers approximately 15 hectares (37 acres). The dominant feature, other than the open areas of park is the North Sydney Oval complex with its playing field, grandstands and commercial spaces, the Parks depot and a childcare centre. North Sydney Oval ( Oval No 1) - The original open village-green oval that has remained in existence since its dedication in 1867, making it one of the oldest cricket grounds in Australia. The National Trust Listing of 1993 refers to it as the oldest. It includes the Bob Stand, constructed in 1895, and re-located from the Sydney Cricket Ground to St Leonards Park in 1983. The Duncan Thompson stand was constructed in 1929 and was, at the time of construction, the largest suburban grandstand in NSW.

Other architectural features of note include:

- Bon Andrews Oval – A rectangular sports field with an amenities building named the Cunningham Pavilion. It is constructed in the Inter-War style with a 1990s addition by architect Feiko Bouman. The oval has been in use since 1894.
- Music Shell – The Music Shell was designed by acclaimed architects Peddle Thorp and Walker in the Art Moderne style. It is a two level building at the rear which provided a band practice room with storage for chairs. At the front, the stage area is enhanced by a dramatic roof structure that is enhanced by relief sculptures and other refined detailing, including urns and decorative grilles on either side of the stage.
- Tunks Memorial Fountain – This fountain is a Sicilian marble fountain that was installed in the park in 1885 in honour of William Tunks, first Mayor of East Leonards and Member of State Parliament. Tunks was instrumental in the establishment of St Leonards Park, its early layout and plantings.
- War Memorial – The War Memorial, constructed 1926, is an imposing Inter-War Art Deco style cenotaph made from Bowral trachyte. It is 13m in height and was, at its time of construction, the largest and most imposing war memorial constructed in Sydney. Subsequent plaques have been added to the war memorial to commemorate later wars.
- World War I Field Gun – This is a 77 millimetres (3.0 in) field gun mounted on a pedestal in the north-west corner of the park. The field gun was captured from the Germans in France in 1918. This and other similar war weapons were distributed to Army units, schools and communities as a reminder of the sacrifice of the armed services.
- Playground – The children's playground is located on the site of what was the site of two tennis courts in the 1930s and is contained within a Depression period concrete rusticated fence.
- Stone Shelter – This shelter was constructed from rock-faced sandstone in 1943 with four arches and a terracotta tiled roof. There are four concrete tables.
- Oval Bus Shelter – Originally a former tram stop, the Oval Bus Shelter is a small timber rectangular structure comprising stop-chamfered timber posts on concrete pads, supporting a timber framed hipped roof covered with terracotta shingle tiles. It is designed in the Late Twentieth Century Post Modern style.
- Air Raid Trenches – Although filled in, the Second World War saw the construction of slit air raid trenches in St Leonards Park in a zig-zag configuration across the northern end of St Leonards Park and in the area now near the War Memorial.
- North Sydney Leagues Bowling Club – The land for a bowling green was set aside in 1887 with the first clubhouse constructed in the 1880s and since demolished in the 1960s. The existing club building was financed by the club.
- Open Parkland – St Leonards Park has a gardenesque character with open lawns studded by both remnant native trees and planted specimens of indigenous species that represent the site's original plant community. These include: Callitris rhomboidea (Port Jackson pine), Corymbia gummifera (red bloodwood), Eucalyptus haemastoma (scribbly gum), Eucalyptus piperita (Sydney peppermint), and Syncarpia glomulifera (turpentine). Other trees that have been planted include: Ficus macrophylla (Moreton Bay figs), Ficus rubiginosa (Port Jackson figs). Ficus hillii (Hills weeping fig), Araucaria bidwillii (bunya-bunya pine), Toona australis (red cedar), Lophostemon confertus (brushbox), Macadamia integrifolia (macadamia), Melaleuca quinquenerivia (paperbark), Eucalyptus citriodora (lemon-scented gum), Eucalyptus botryoides (bangalay), Eucalyptus cinerea (Argyle apple), Quercus robur (English oak), Populus nigra var. italica (Lombardy poplar), and Phoenix canariensis (Canary Islands palm).

A few dead tree stumps have also been retained for their habitat value for nesting sites of the local parrot species and possums.

Significant group plantings include the: Fig tree avenue in Fig Tree Lane which commemorate the closure of the portion of Carlow St within the park; Araucaria trees and Eucalyptus citriodora (lemon scented gum) row plantings along the Falcon St edge; Lophostemon confertus (brush box) row plantings along the Miller Sedge; Phoenix canariensis (Canary Islands palm) row plantings in the north-western corner of the park and either side of Tunks Avenue, north of the War Memorial Rotary Wheel Rose Garden and Tree, Memorial trees commemorating significant people and events include the: Judge Bouler Tree, J. D. Fletcher Tree after James Duncan Fletcher.

=== Condition ===
All elements in the soft landscape of St Leonards Park are in excellent condition. The War Memorial and Tunks Fountain are in good condition however, the setting has been cluttered by light poles and an enclosing wall extension to the North Sydney Oval complex. North Sydney Oval is in excellent condition however, the pavilions and grandstands are generally in a fair condition with the Duncan Thompson Stand being in poor condition.

=== Modifications and dates ===
The North Sydney Sewer Vent was originally located within St Leonards Park, however it was separated by the Falcon Street exit ramp when the Warringah Expressway was constructed in the 1960s. It is now located on a small landscaped island and is listed as a State Heritage Item (285047).

=== Further information ===
The 1836 park layout is largely intact with the only exception being the acquisition and excise of land for the 1960s construction of the Warringah Expressway.

The original 1870s pathways and plantings are still evident and are representative of Victorian era public parks.

The three main sporting venues, the two ovals and the bowling greens are continuing in their use in their original location.

The original landmark fig trees planted along the main avenues are largely intact and replacement planting has been undertaken where trees have been lost from age or storms.

The later development that occurred in the park during the 1930s and 1940s with the construction of the War Memorial, Music Shell, playground and palm trees avenues also imbue a strong aesthetic character sympathetic to the Victorian era park plan.

The major park upgrade in the 1980s by architect Feiko Bouman saw the upgrading of the North Sydney Oval complex, the re-surfacing of pathways, new lighting and the re-location of the Bob Stand from the Sydney Cricket Ground to North Sydney Oval.

== Heritage listing ==
St Leonards Park is of state heritage significance for its historical values as one of the earliest established public parks in NSW being set aside as a recreation reserve in 1838 and gazetted as a public park in 1867. It also contains one of Australia's oldest, continuously used cricket grounds and bowling clubs established in 1867 and 1887 respectively.

St Leonards Park is of state heritage significance as a surviving and relatively intact example of a Victorian public park in the gardenesque style. It retains many of its original aesthetic characteristics including an axial layout, formal pathways culminating in memorials, including an ornate Victorian style memorial fountain to Mayor William Tunks, and picturesque vistas. The park also includes distinctive examples of early 20th century architecture and Modern Movement architecture which are aesthetically distinctive and demonstrate a high level of creative and technical achievement.

St Leonard's Park has state significant historic associations with Mr Edgar Herbert a noted pioneering specialist in physical education who was involved in the establishment of the playground and educational programs at the park in the 1930s and early 1940s.

The site is of state heritage significance as a rare and representative example of a largely intact Victorian era park designed in the gardenesque style with its original layout still appreciable. It is also rare as a continuously used cricket ground and bowling club dating from 1867 and 1887 respectively. The post WWII music shell and Modern movement style Bowling Club are rare surviving examples of these types of structures.

St Leonards Park was listed on the New South Wales State Heritage Register on 31 July 2015 having satisfied the following criteria.

The place is important in demonstrating the course, or pattern, of cultural or natural history in New South Wales.

St Leonards Park is of state heritage significance for its historical values as one of the earliest established public parks in NSW being set aside as a recreation reserve in 1838 and gazetted as a public park in 1867. It contains one of Australia's oldest, continuously used cricket grounds and bowling clubs established in 1867 and 1887 respectively.

The place has a strong or special association with a person, or group of persons, of importance of cultural or natural history of New South Wales's history.

The park has state significant associations with Mr Edgar Herbert a noted pioneering specialist in physical education. He was also a valued supervisor of Playgrounds to the Kindergarten Union, a colleague of Walter Burley Griffin and actively involved in the Castlecrag Progress Association. In the 1940s Herbert was Principal of the Leadership Training College which staffed the playground and implemented a program of dance and drama activities as well as sporting events.

The place is important in demonstrating aesthetic characteristics and/or a high degree of creative or technical achievement in New South Wales.

St Leonards Park is of state heritage significance as a surviving and relatively intact example of a Victorian public park in the gardenesque style. It retains many of its original aesthetic characteristics including an axial layout, formal pathways culminating in memorials, including an ornate Victorian style memorial fountain to Mayor William Tunks, and picturesque vistas. The park also includes distinctive examples of early 20th century architecture including: the Bob Stand which was relocated to St Leonards Park from the Sydney Cricket Ground in the 1980s, the WWI Memorial, a fine example of an Interwar Stripped Classical WWI Memorial, designed by Frank Thorpe and the Music Shell designed by Peddle Thorp and Walker in the Art Moderne style. The 1960s Bowling Club is a good and intact example of Modern Movement architecture applied to a popular leisure activity. These features are aesthetically distinctive and demonstrate a high level of creative and technical achievement.

The place has a strong or special association with a particular community or cultural group in New South Wales for social, cultural or spiritual reasons.

St Leonards Park has a high level of local social significance as a recreational facility for cricket and various forms of football.

The place possesses uncommon, rare or endangered aspects of the cultural or natural history of New South Wales.

The site is of state heritage significance as a rare and intact example of a Victorian era park designed in the gardenesque style with its original layout still appreciable. It is also rare as a continuously used cricket ground and bowling club dating from 1867 and 1887 respectively.

The Music Shell is a rare intact surviving example of a Post WWII Music Shell, sympathetically adapted to serve contemporary purposes.

The 1960s Bowling Club building is a rare, surviving, intact example of a Modern Movement style building serving as a Sporting facility. Many sports club buildings designed in this style in the 1960s have been demolished or substantially modified.

The place is important in demonstrating the principal characteristics of a class of cultural or natural places/environments in New South Wales.

The park has representative value within NSW, as it displays elements typical of Victorian era parks including an axial layout, formal avenues of trees, open grassed areas, decorative architectural elements as well as sporting facilities. It is a fine, relatively intact example of a wider group of public parks constructed during the nineteenth century.

== See also ==
- List of parks in Sydney
- List of sports venues in Sydney
