= Biljana Dekic =

Australian chess player

Biljana Dekić
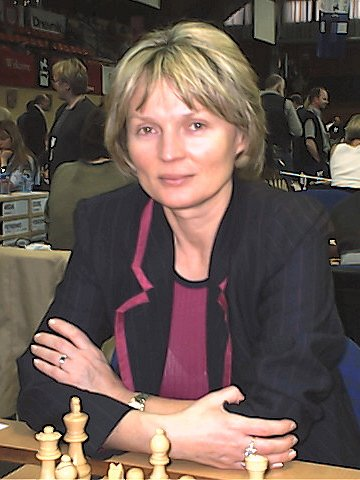
- Biljana Dekić playing in the 35th Chess Olympiad in Bled, Slovenia 2002

Personal information
- Born: Belgrade, Yugoslavia

Chess career
- Country: Australia (after 1988); Yugoslavia (before 1988)
- Title: Woman International Master (1990)
- FIDE rating: 1947 (May 2021)
- Peak rating: 2160 (July 1990)

Biljana N. Dekić (born 16 May 1950) is a chess Woman International Master who has represented Australia in eleven Chess Olympiads.

== Chess career ==
Dekic was a member of the national Women's Chess Team representing Yugoslavia in international women's chess tournaments. For her results, she was awarded the title of Yugoslav National Chess Master.

In 1988 Dekic immigrated to Australia with her husband and 2 children, becoming the strongest female chess player in Australia at the time, and later became an Australian citizen.

Dekic has represented Australia in 12 Women's Chess Olympiads in 1990, 1992, 1994, 1996, 1998, 2000, 2002, 2008, 2010,2012,2014 and 2016. Her best results were in the 30th Chess Olympiad in Manila 1992 where she scored 8/14 on board one, and the 40th Chess Olympiad in Istanbul 2012 where she scored 6/9 on the reserve board. She was the equal top scorer in the Australian Women's team on both occasions.

Dekic represented Australia in four Women's Zonal Chess Championships. In 1990 Dekic finished third in the Asian Women's Zonal Chess Championship in Shah Alam, Malaysia behind the future Women's World Chess Championship winner Xie Jun and WGM Zhaoqin Peng. For this result, she was awarded the title of Woman International Master. Dekic finished second in the Asian Women's Zonal Chess Championship in Kuala Lumpur 1991, and finished fifth in the event in Jakarta 1993. In 2011, she finished third in the Oceania Women's Zonal Chess Championship in Rotorua, New Zealand.

Dekic scored 5/9 and finished equal eighth in the 15th World Senior Chess Championship held in Lignano Sabbiadoro, Italy in 2005.

She was a member of the Australian Women's Chess Team in the 1st World Mind Sports Games held in Beijing, China in October 2008.

Dekic became the first woman to win the North Sydney Chess Club Lightning Championship in 2000 and repeated her success and won the title again in 2005.

From 2002 to 2006 Dekic was the vice president of FIDE Committee for Women's Chess, assigned with the promotion and development of Women's chess worldwide.

== Personal life ==
Dekic obtained a double degree in Electrical Engineering and Computer Science from the University of Belgrade, School of Electrical Engineering. She started her career in the information technology industry and became the Chief Information Officer of the Yugoslav building corporation RAD in Belgrade. Dekic held a number of executive management positions in both the public and private sector, including banking, government, education, transport, steel industry, civil engineering and construction engineering.
