= North Sydney Sewer Vent =

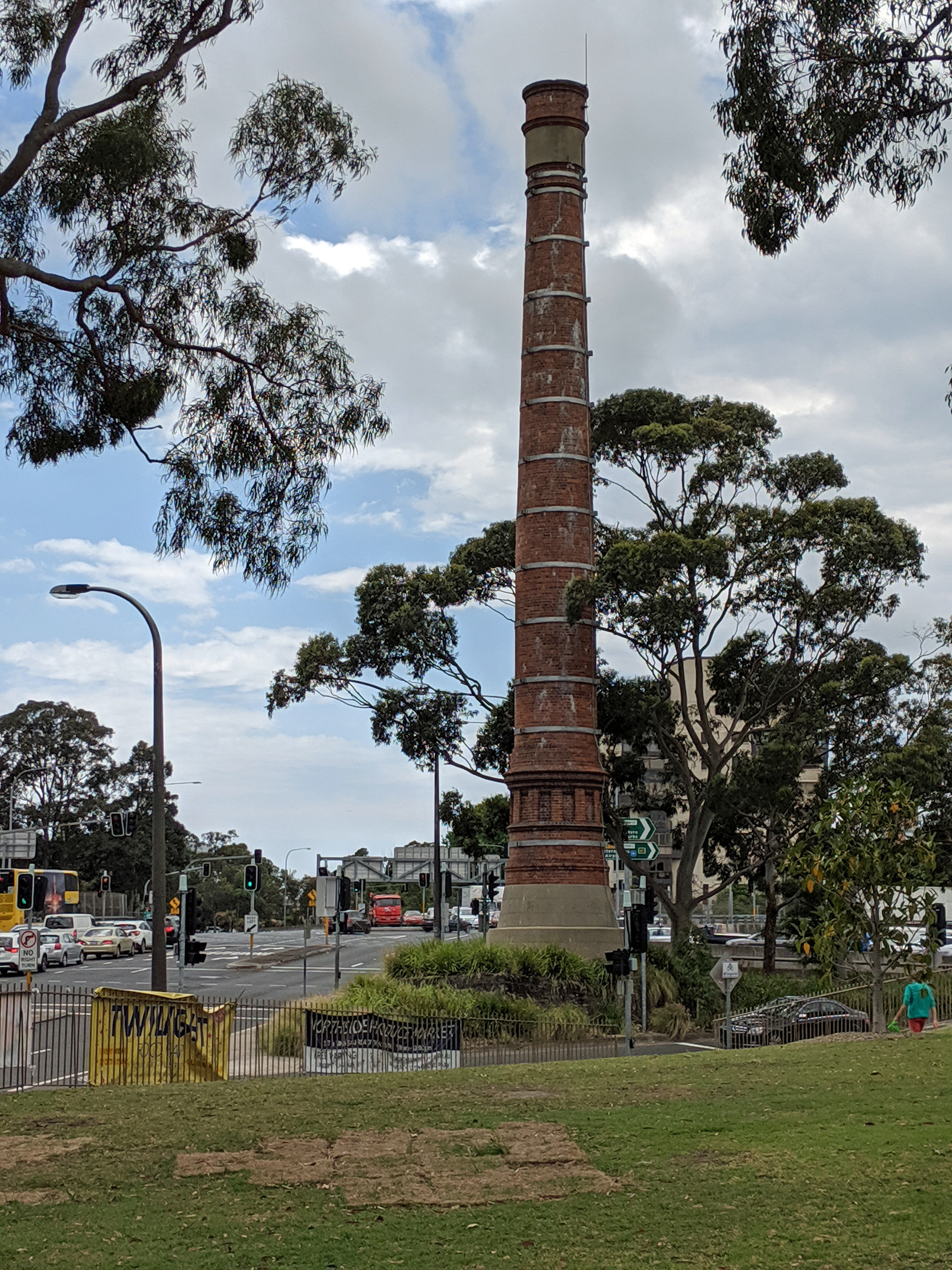
- North Sydney Sewer Vent, Corner Falcon Street and Warringah Freeway, North Sydney, New South Wales

- Location within Sydney Location within Australia
- 33°49′48″S 151°12′47″E
- Location: Falcon Street, North Sydney, North Sydney Council, New South Wales, Australia

History
- Built: c. 1899
- Built for: Metropolitan Board of Water Supply and Sewerage

Site notes
- Architect(s): Metropolitan Board of Water Supply and Sewerage
- Owner: Sydney Water

New South Wales Heritage Register
- Official name: Sewer Vent; North Sydney Sewer Vent; Alfred St Sewer Vent
- Type: State heritage (built)
- Designated: 15 November 2002
- Reference no.: 1641
- Type: Other - Utilities - Sewerage
- Category: Utilities - Sewerage
- Builders: Metropolitan Board of Water Supply and Sewerage

The North Sydney Sewer Vent is a heritage-listed sewer ventilation stack located at the corner of Falcon Street and Warringah Freeway, North Sydney, North Sydney Council, New South Wales, Australia. It was designed and built by the Metropolitan Board of Water Supply and Sewerage. It is also known as North Sydney Sewer Vent and Alfred St Sewer Vent. The property is owned by Sydney Water, an agency of the Government of New South Wales. It was added to the New South Wales State Heritage Register on 15 November 2002.

== History ==
Part of the original North Sydney sewerage system built by the government between 1891 and 1898. Oral history sources have revealed that prior to the construction of the Bradfield Highway, foul odours permeated the area. Successive complaints may have led to the removal of the dome which is no longer in situ. Odours are still detectable under certain climatic conditions. Expressway construction in the 1960s may have been responsible for severe movement in the shaft of the structure which may have caused cracking. Stabilisation has been undertaken, involving the introduction of steel hoops around the brickwork. The stack was originally wholly within St Leonards Park, however as this was reclaimed by the Highway, the vent now stands on an island separate to the Park.

== Description ==
A brick ventilation stack built 30 metres (98 ft) high, and a diameter at internal base of 1.70 metres (5 ft 7 in), tapering to 1.1 metres (3 ft 7 in) at the top of the structure. The original design included a pagoda-like dome at the apex of the structure, however the top is currently defined by a cement rendered parapet. The base of the structure contains an iron inspection hatch into which is engraved, "Metropolitan Board of Water Supply and Sewerage 1899". Brickwork is slightly ornamental but is more austere than that of similar stacks built earlier on the southern side of the harbour. Parallel steel bands now encircle the structure, introduced during the 1960s as a stabilisation device.

The vent is considerably intact.

=== Modifications and dates ===
The ventshaft is located alongside the Cahill Expressway. Some of the cracks that are present along the length of the ventshaft may be the result of earth movements during the construction of the expressway in the 1960s. As such, a series of circular steel bands have been applied to the exterior of the Vent, at evenly spaced intervals, as a stabilisation measure.

=== Further information ===
Refer to other inventory listings for Lewisham Sewer Vent, Bellevue Hill Sewer Ventshaft, Glebe Sewer Ventshaft, Marrickville Sewer Ventshaft.

== Heritage listing ==
As at 30 November 2001, the North Sydney Sewer Vent is an excellent representative example of the tall brick sewer ventilation shafts which were constructed around the turn of the century to facilitate the efficient functioning of the major outfall sewers. Its functional design is embellished by a successful application of architectural motifs, such as line and texture which lend the structure an element of formalism and classical detail including entasis. In addition, it displays high quality workmanship in the brickwork.

By virtue of its scale and form, it has landmark value within the Cremorne / Crows Nest area and acts as a navigational beacon for motorists using the Bradfield Highway. It has the potential to invoke a sense of the past as its style and design contrast dramatically with the modern styles of architecture endemic to the North Sydney streetscape. It is currently serves the NSOOS in the manner in which it was originally designed.

The North Sydney Sewer Vent was listed on the New South Wales State Heritage Register on 15 November 2002 having satisfied the following criteria.

The place is important in demonstrating the course, or pattern, of cultural or natural history in New South Wales.

The ventshaft is an important and essential part of the original North Sydney sewerage system, which still remains. It played a large role in dissipating odorous gases from the system and away from residential/street levels.

The place is important in demonstrating aesthetic characteristics and/or a high degree of creative or technical achievement in New South Wales.

The ventshaft is an excellent example of brick work with ornate sections at and around the base and entasis to the shaft. It is a landmark on the North Sydney expressway and adds to the landscape of the adjacent park, St Leonards Park and North Sydney Oval.

The place has a strong or special association with a particular community or cultural group in New South Wales for social, cultural or spiritual reasons.

The ventshaft is significant in the development of the sewerage system itself. Without the ventshaft gases built up within the system were extremely dangerous to the community and the workers and is therefore likely to be held in high regard by the community for its function. It has been identified by the National Trust of Australia (NSW).

The place has potential to yield information that will contribute to an understanding of the cultural or natural history of New South Wales.

Ventshafts and their development show the progress made in understanding how and why gases formed in the sewerage system. They also show how the different types of ventshafts were employed to dissipate odorous gases.

The place possesses uncommon, rare or endangered aspects of the cultural or natural history of New South Wales.

Rare in the SWC system and in NSW as one of a small number of ventshafts of its type limited to the late nineteenth century period.

The place is important in demonstrating the principal characteristics of a class of cultural or natural places/environments in New South Wales.

An excellent representation of a tall brick ventilation constructed around the turn of the century. Unique in its brickwork.

== See also ==
- Sydney Water
