= Melbourne Chess Club =

Australian chess group

- Type: Regional Chess Club
- Founded: 1866
- Location: Fitzroy, Victoria
- Country: Australia
- Website: Official Website

The Melbourne Chess Club was founded in 1866 and initially called the Melbourne Chess Association, it later changed its name to the Melbourne Chess Club in Fitzroy, Victoria and is one of the oldest continually existing chess club in Australia and the Southern Hemisphere.

Charles G. M. Watson joined the Melbourne Chess Club, and he won the Melbourne Chess Club championships in 1898, 1902, 1904, 1905, 1914, 1921, 1931 and 1936.

== See also ==
- North Sydney Chess Club
- Perth Chess Club
