= North Sydney Chess Club =

- Type: Regional Chess Club
- Founded: 1908
- Location: Sydney, New South Wales
- Country: Australia
- Website: Official Website

The North Sydney Chess Club was founded in 1908 and is one of the oldest continually existing Chess club in Australia and the Southern Hemisphere. Its current home is in the Norths Leagues Club.

== Notable Members and Alumni ==
- Biljana Dekic - became the first woman to win the North Sydney Chess Club Lightning Championship in 2000 and repeated her success and won the title again in 2005.
- Lajos Steiner – Hungarian–Australian master who was Australian Champion and a key figure in 20th-century Australian chess.
- John Purdy – Two-time Australian Champion and son of legendary player and writer C.J.S. Purdy.
- Terrey Shaw – A national champion and respected administrator.
- Max Illingworth – Grandmaster, coach, and former Olympiad representative.
- Anton Smirnov – International Master from a young age, and one of Australia’s top grandmasters today.

== See also ==
- Melbourne Chess Club
- Perth Chess Club
