= Christ Church, Lavender Bay =

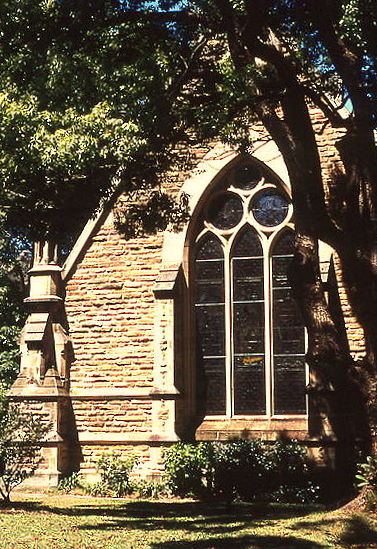

- Location in greater metropolitan Sydney
- 33°50′33″S 151°12′27″E
- Location: Lavender Bay, New South Wales
- Country: Australia
- Denomination: Anglican
- Website: www.cclb.org.au//

History
- Status: Church
- Founded: 1868

Architecture
- Functional status: Complete
- Architect: Benjamin Backhouse
- Architectural type: Gothic Revival
- Years built: 1869–72

Clergy
- Rector: Rev. Gregory Webster

Christ Church, Lavender Bay is an Anglican church in the Sydney suburb of Lavender Bay, Australia, just north of the Sydney Harbour Bridge. The church was listed on the now defunct Register of the National Estate.

== History ==
Christ Church was founded in 1868 and the present building was built to Gothic Revival designs by Benjamin Backhouse, chosen by competition. It was constructed by William Eaton in 1869–72, using sandstone quarried on the new site. Services of worship have been conducted since 1872. The church uses the most recent liturgy of the Anglican Church of Australia, A Prayer Book for Australia.

One of Australia's first popular music stars was a young member of the choir here around 1951. The choir at that stage had 10 or 12 members mostly young pre teenagers with some adults with as the deeper voices. The choirmaster was Mr Booker who was also the local scout master. Young Laurie Rix was a soprano and for a couple of years, won the coveted silver medal for singing. They had two services of a Sunday and had choir practice on Wednesday nights. The Rev Dr Cash was the church's rector at that time.

Ten years later, Laurie Rix had become one of Australia's most popular singing stars under the name Lonnie Lee. On 26 November 1960, Cash conducted his marriage there to Pamela Beveridge. The church was overflowing with guests, many of them well known stars and VIPs. The biggest star of that time, Johnny O'Keefe was Lonnie's best man and as they left the church, Lonnie's band, the Leemen, formed a guard of honour at the church entrance. After this, they headed of to the ABC TV studios where they made an appearance on the top TV music show of the time, Six O'Clock Rock, which O'Keefe compered and Lee their most popular star.

== Current ministry ==
The current rector is the Revd Gregory Webster. The church holds services on Sundays, with a traditional service at 10.00am and a contemporary service at 5.00pm.

== See also ==
- Australian non-residential architectural styles
- List of Anglican churches in the Diocese of Sydney
