= Liberty Grove, New South Wales =

Liberty Grove
- Suburb
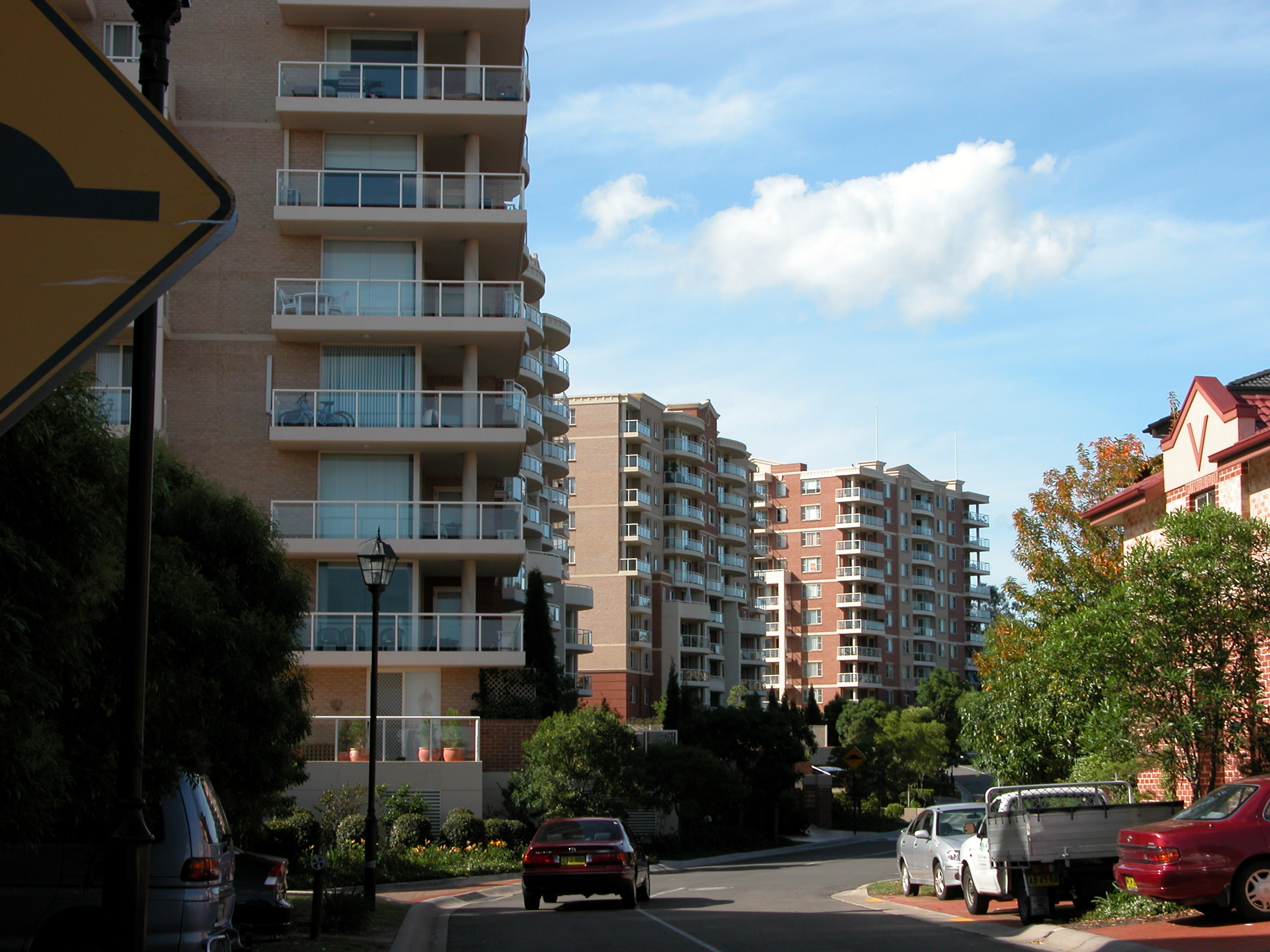
- Liberty Grove highrises

- Interactive map of Liberty Grove
- Country: Australia
- State: New South Wales
- City: Sydney
- LGA: City of Canada Bay
- Location: 17 km (11 mi) west of Sydney CBD
- Established: 1998

Government
  - State electorate: Drummoyne
  - Federal division: Reid

Area
  - Total: 0.23 km^{2} (0.089 sq mi)
- Elevation: 7 m (23 ft)

Population
  - Total: 2,055 (2021 census)
  - Density: 8,930/km^{2} (23,100/sq mi)
- Postcode: 2138
Suburbs around Liberty Grove
Wentworth Point	Rhodes	Concord West
Sydney Olympic Park	Liberty Grove	Concord West
Homebush	Concord West	Concord West

Liberty Grove is a suburb in the Inner West of Sydney, in the state of New South Wales, Australia. Liberty Grove is located 17 kilometres west of the Sydney central business district, in the local government area of the City of Canada Bay.

Liberty Grove is bound by Homebush Bay Drive (part of the A3 arterial road) to the west and the Main Northern Line railway to the east. It is surrounded by the suburbs of Rhodes to the north and Concord West to the east and south, and it shares the same postcode of 2138.

The Liberty Grove development won the 1999 Urban Development Institute of Australia award for excellence.

== History ==
Settlers first arrived in the area in January 1793 and began farming on 'Liberty Plains'. Through the 20th century it became one of Sydney's industrial areas. However, it and much of adjacent industrial area around Homebush Bay, were completely transformed as part of the Olympic precinct development in preparation for the 2000 Sydney Olympics.

== Amenities ==
The Liberty Grove complex contains swimming pools, tennis courts, basketball court, gymnasium, village green and parks, function room and entrances to Rhodes and Concord West. Rhodes Waterside shopping centre is 100m from the northern entrance.

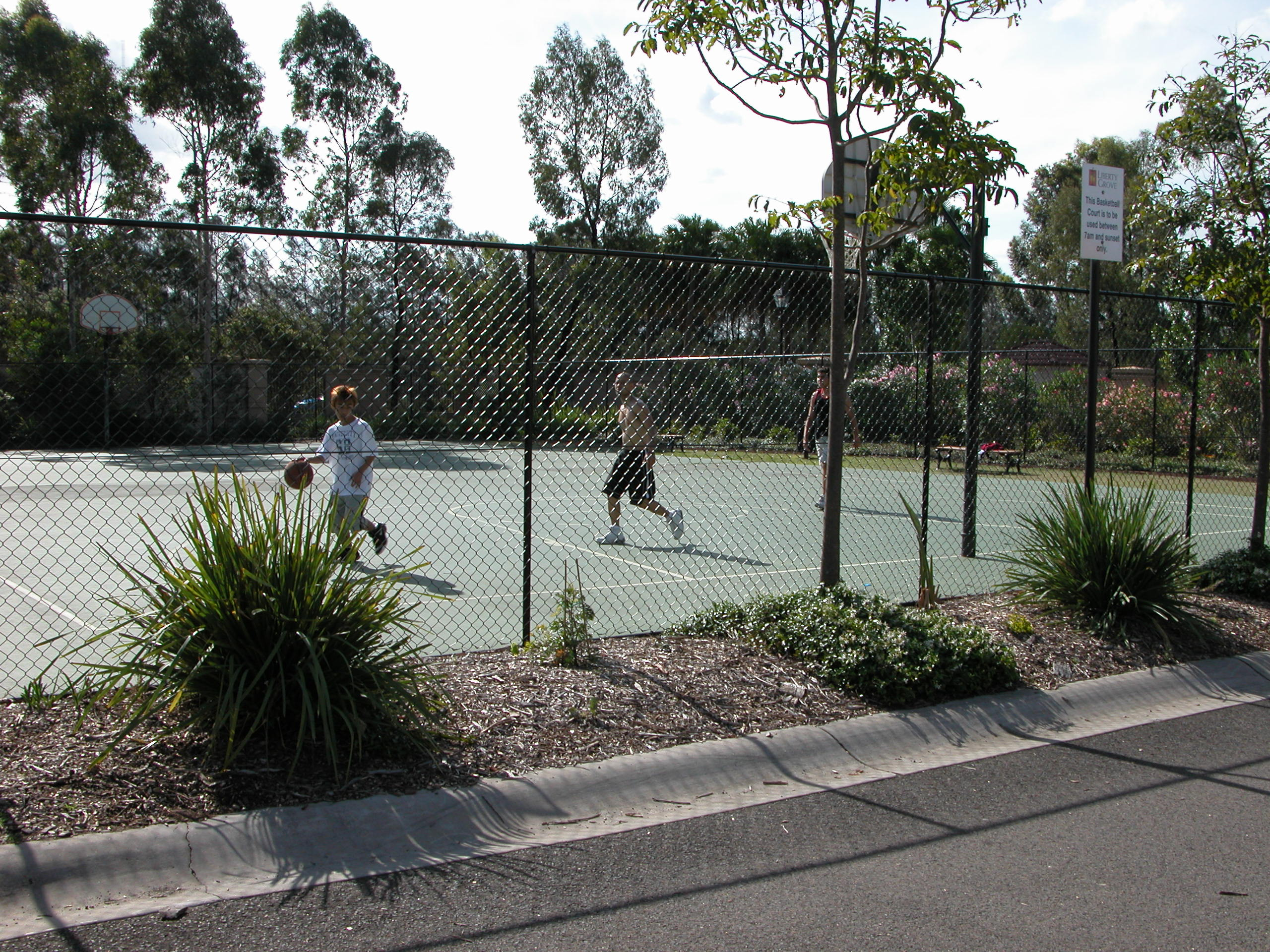
Basketball Court

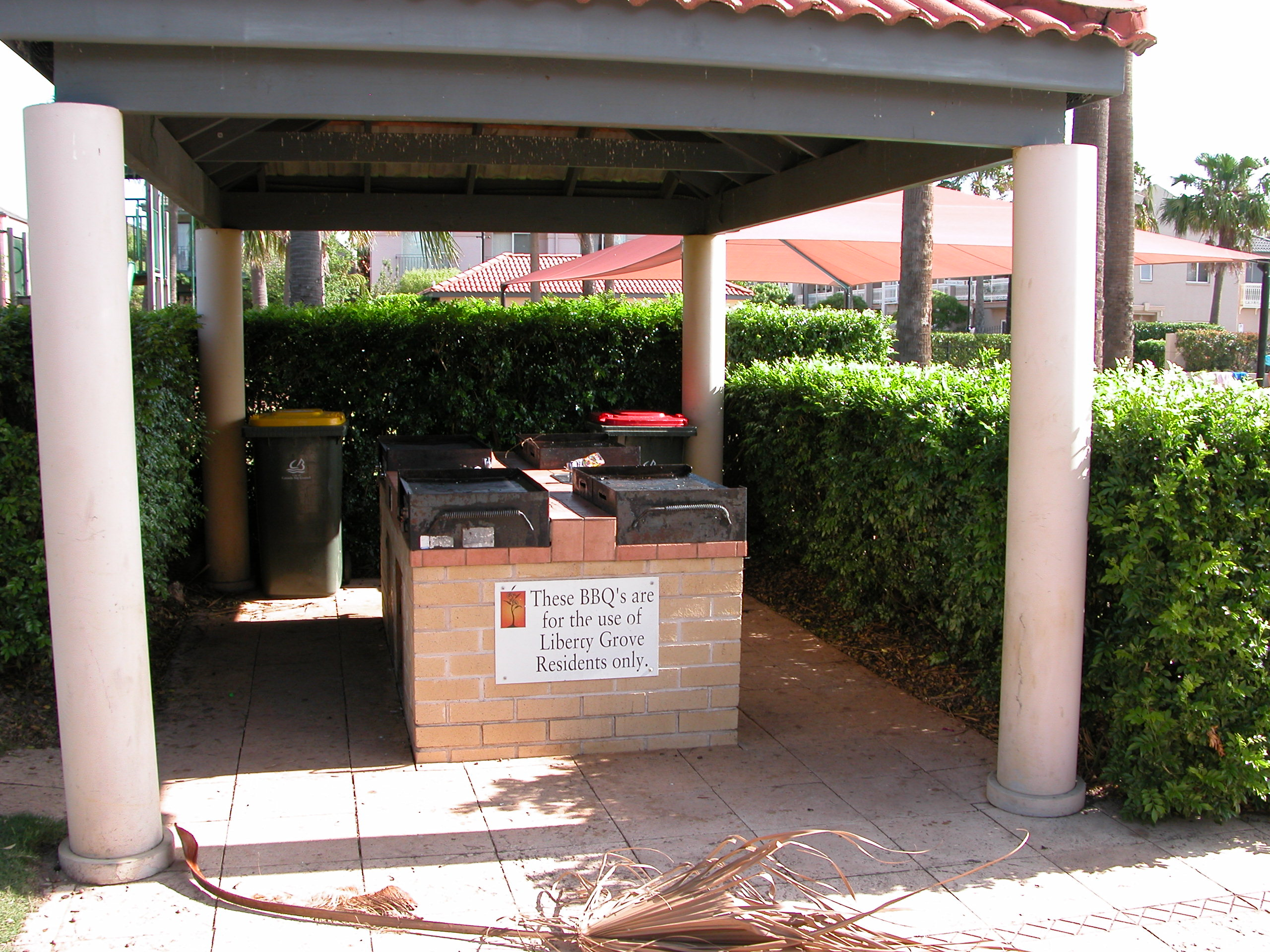
Barbecues near the main pool

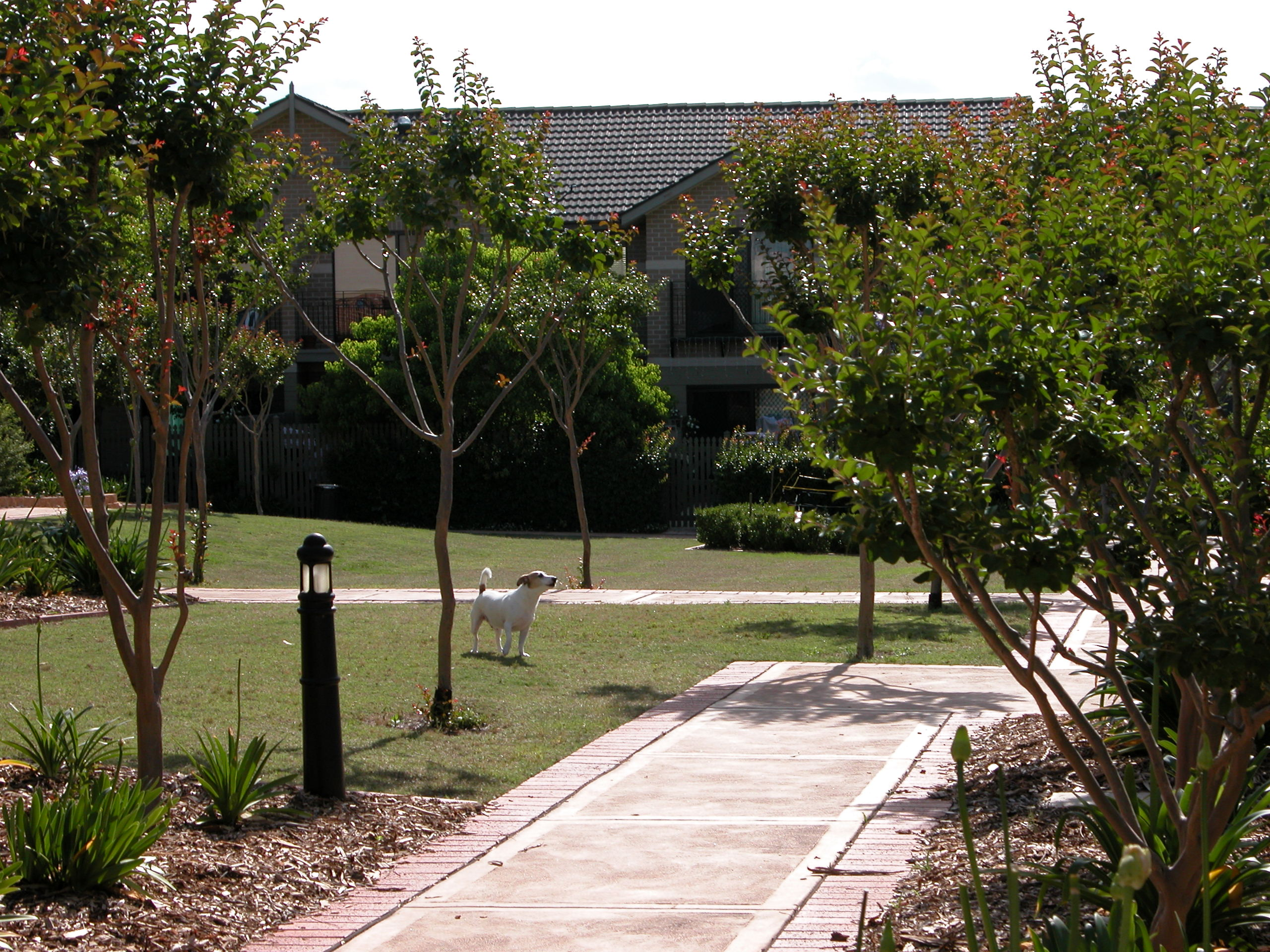
Eliza Park, in the southern end of Liberty Grove

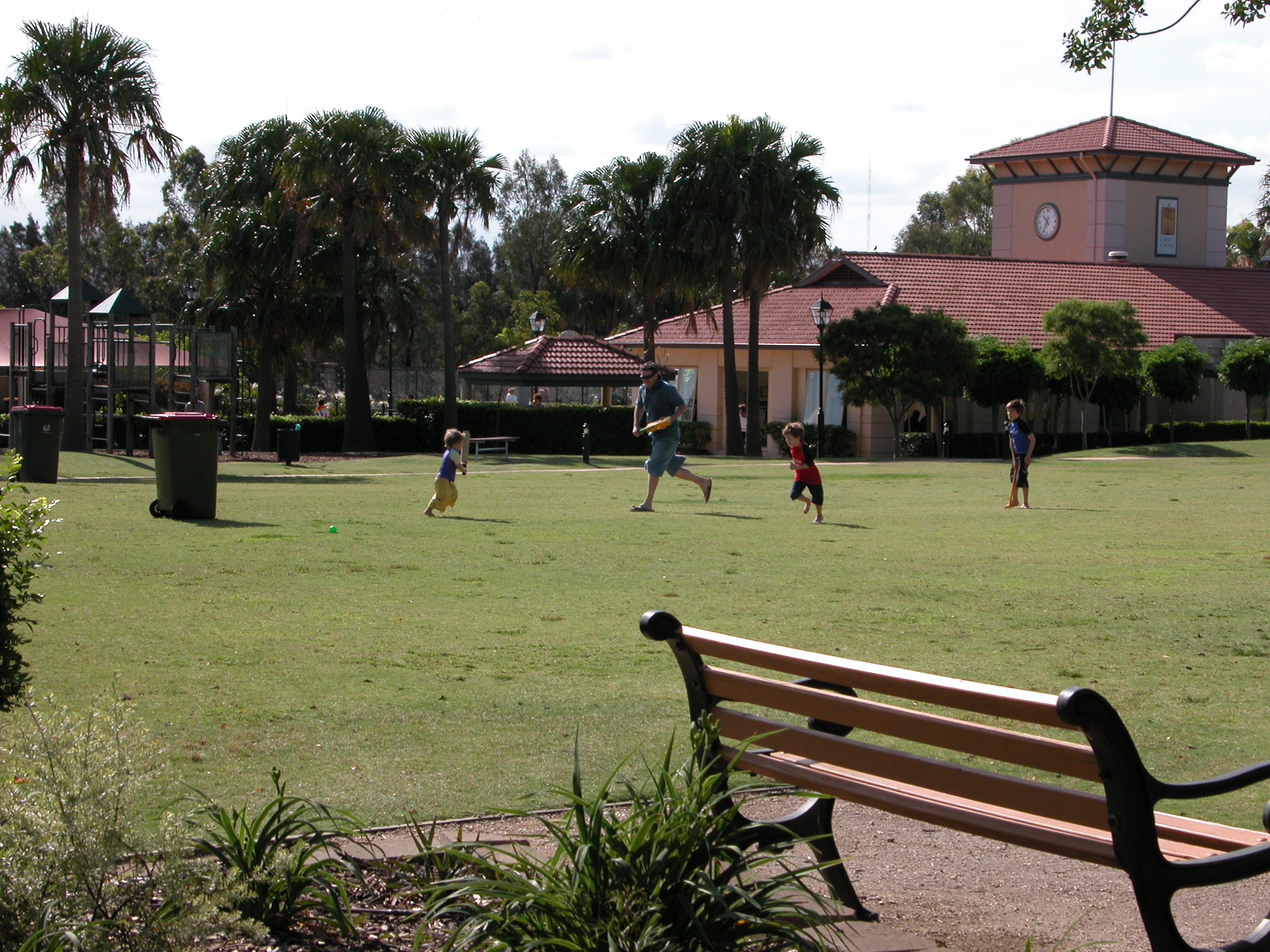
A family playing cricket on the Village Green

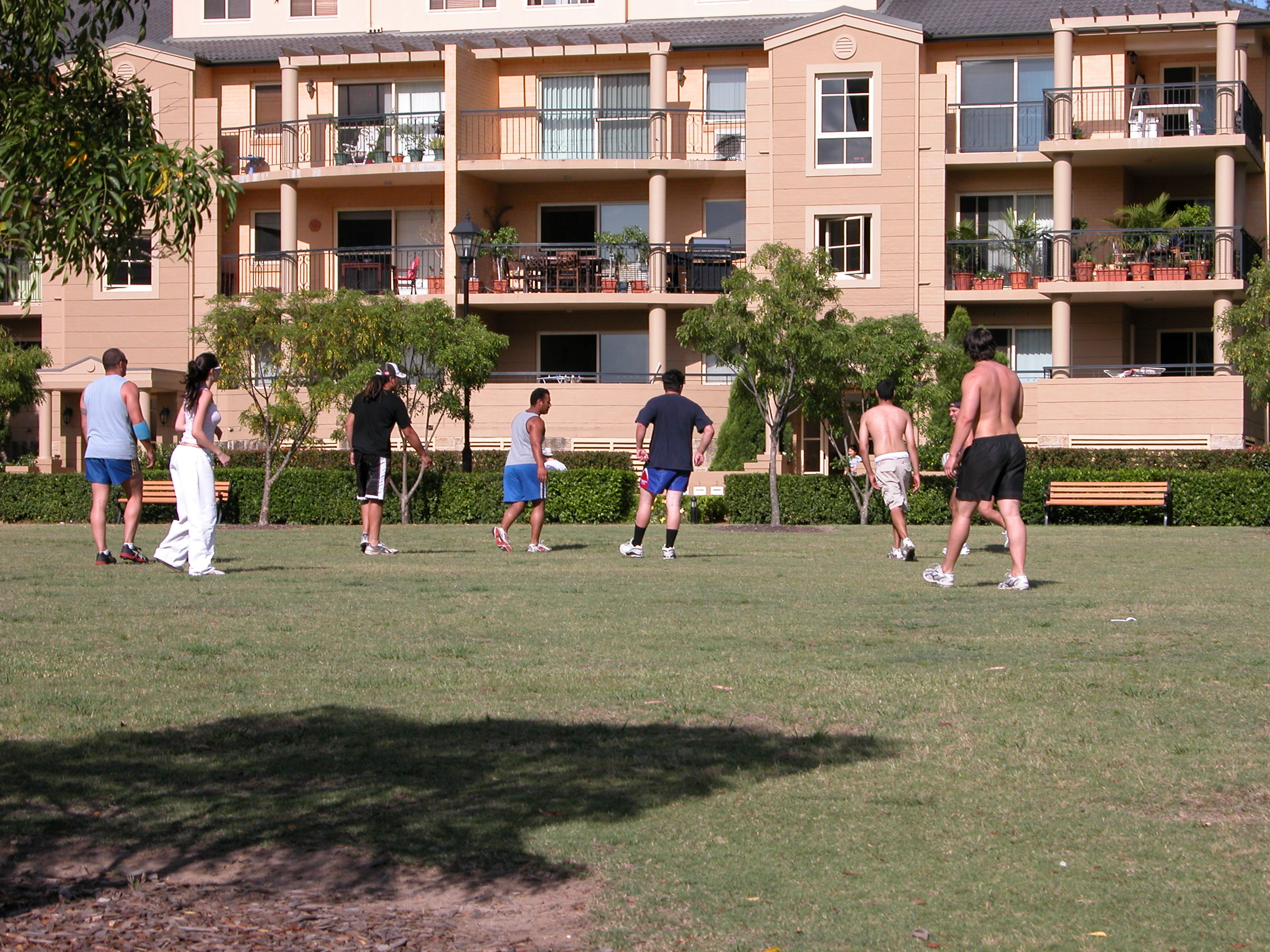
A game of touch football in Bradley Reserve, the northern park

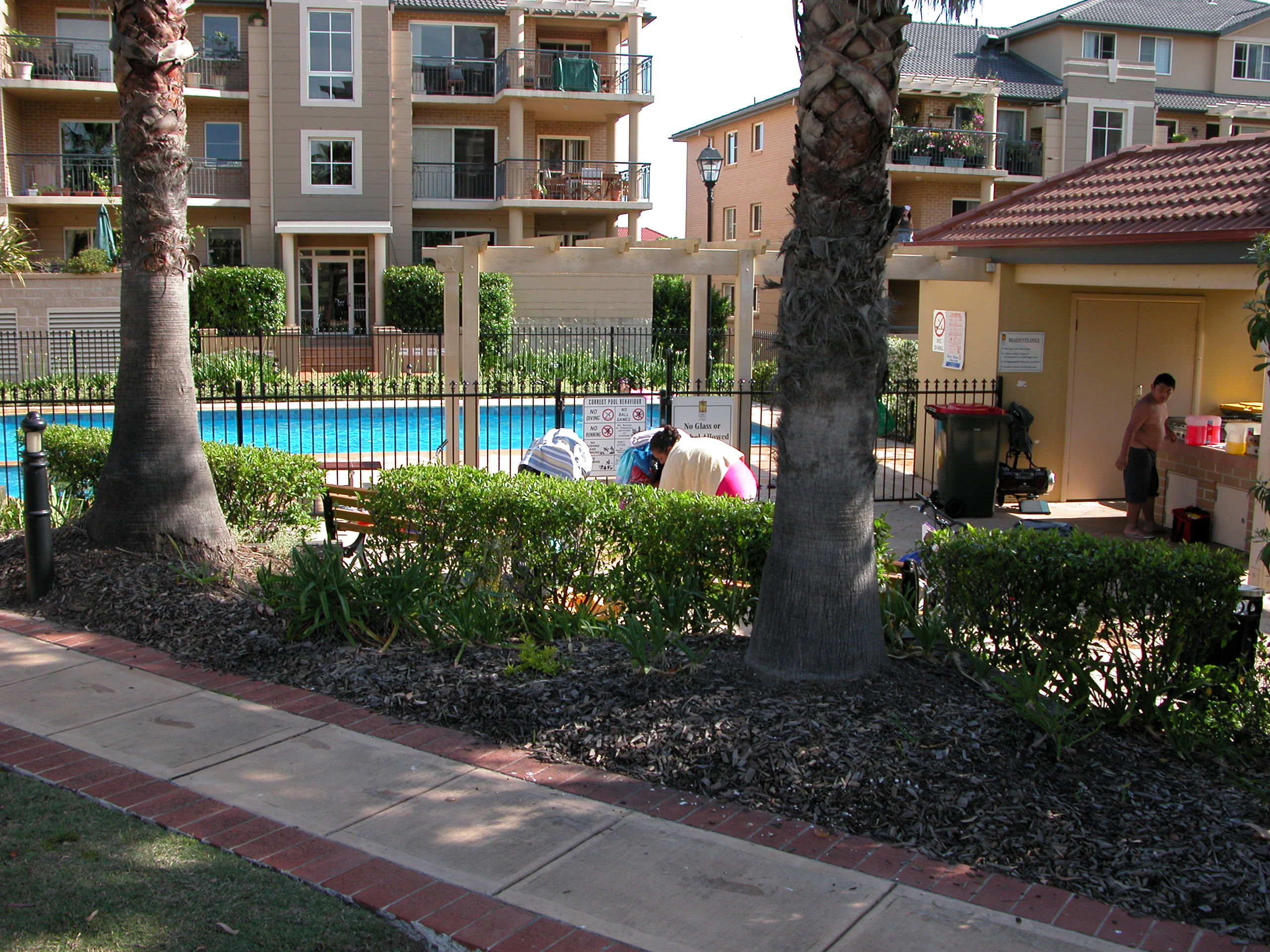
The pool at the southern end of Bradley Reserve

== Transport ==
Vehicle access to Liberty Grove is available only from Homebush Bay Drive and Oulton Ave, in the northwest and north.

The northern (vehicle) entrance is a ten-minute walk to Rhodes railway station and the southern (pedestrian) entrance is a ten-minute walk to Concord West railway station and Bicentennial Park.

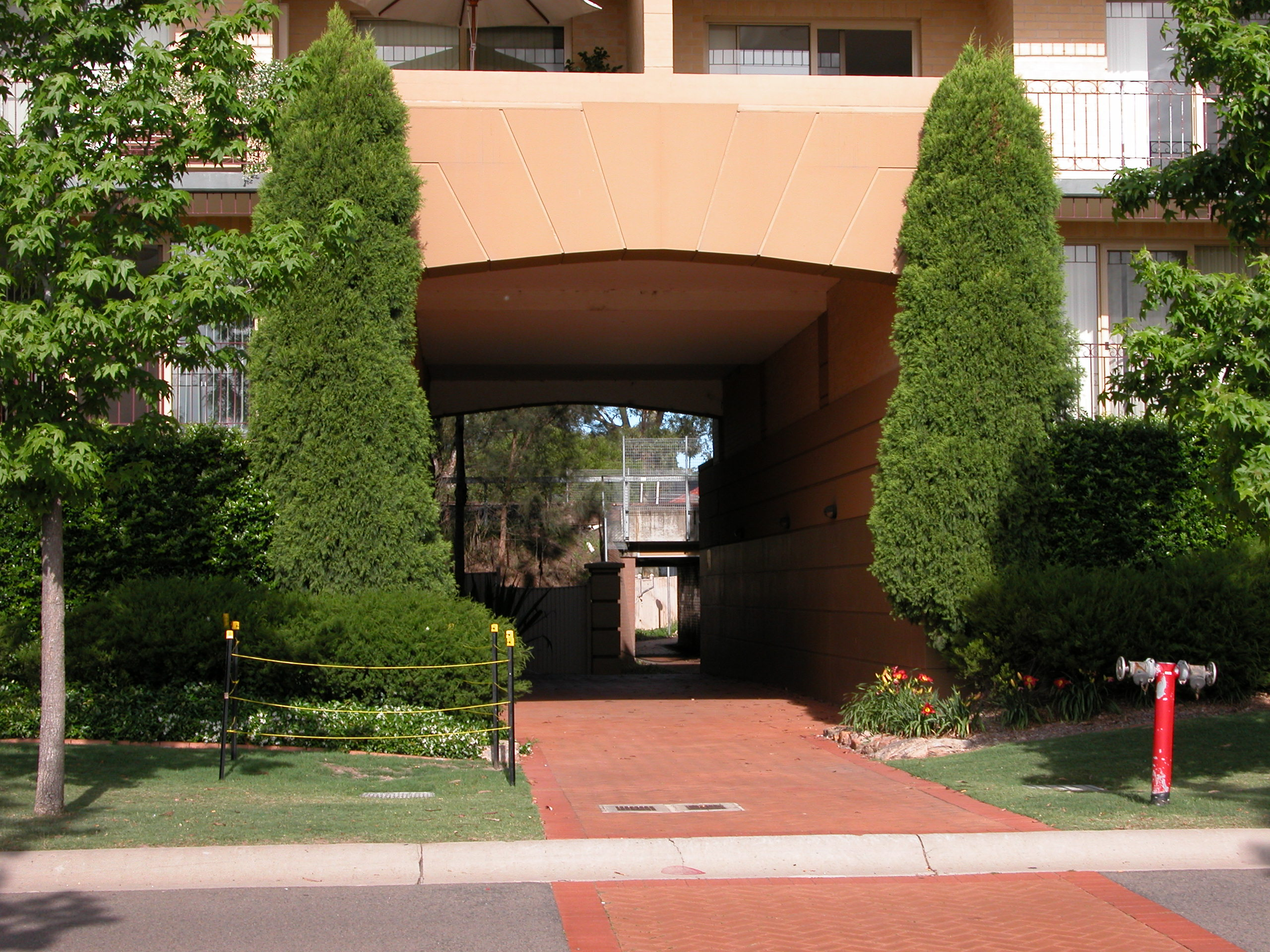
The east pedestrian entrance to the railway line and Queen Street, Concord West

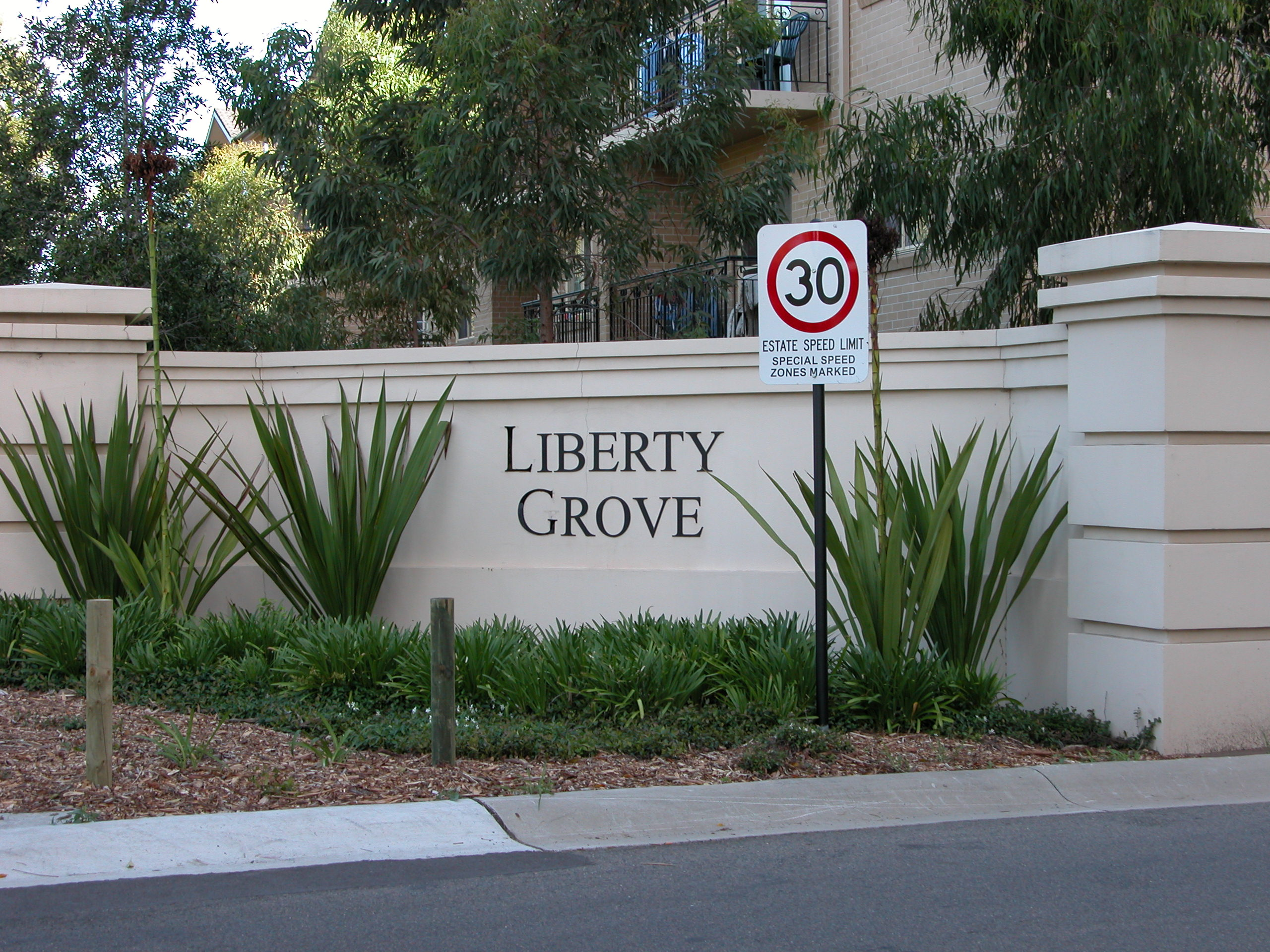
The north vehicle entrance, travelling either north or south on Homebush Bay drive

The large map by the western entrance.

Despite being physically contiguous, Liberty Grove is not directly accessible from Concord West by car. However, Settlers Boulevard, Liberty Grove is accessible from the east by bicycle and foot from an underpass on Queen St Concord West between Castlestead Street and Coonong Road. It is also accessible in the north by bicycle and foot from Rhodes and Concord West at Oulton Avenue. From the south it may be accessed by cyclists and pedestrians at Concord Avenue off King Street, which leads to Concord West, North Strathfield and Olympic Park.
