= Bennelong Bridge =

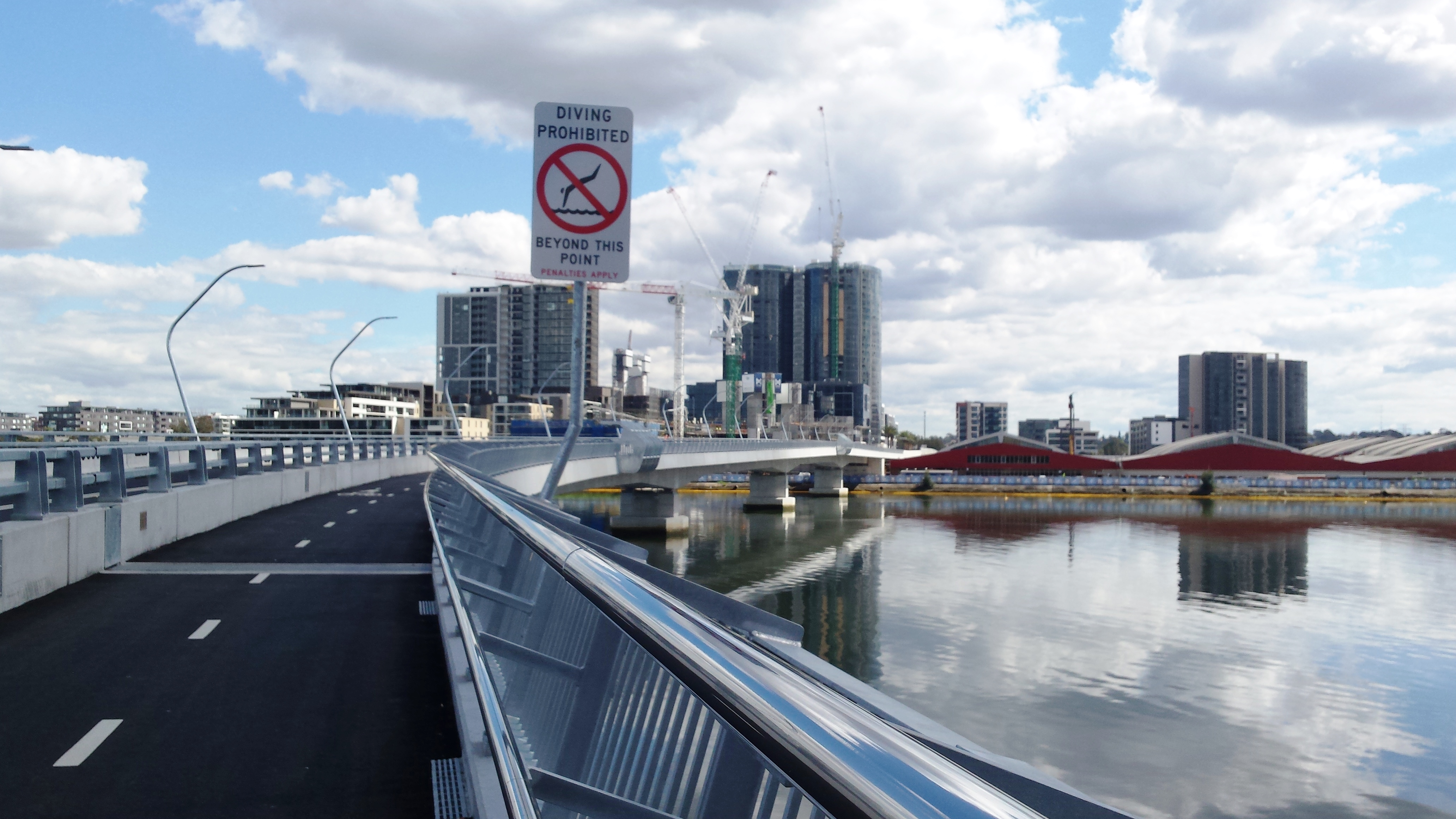
- Bennelong Bridge, from the walkway looking west towards Wentworth Point
- Coordinates: 33°49′39″S 151°04′54″E
- Carries: T-Way buses; Bicycles; Pedestrian only; (Motor vehicles excluded)
- Crosses: Homebush Bay
- Locale: Sydney, New South Wales, Australia
- Begins: Rhodes (east)
- Ends: Wentworth Point (west)
- Named for: Bennelong
- Maintained by: Transport for NSW

Characteristics
- Total length: 330 metres (1,080 ft)

History
- Construction start: 1 September 2014
- Opened: 22 May 2016

Location
- Interactive map of Bennelong Bridge

The Bennelong Bridge is a 330-metre-long (1,080 ft) vehicular bridge across Homebush Bay between the Sydney suburbs of Rhodes and Wentworth Point. Construction started on 1 September 2014, and it opened on 22 May 2016.

Initially known as the Homebush Bay Bridge, it was named Bennelong Bridge after Bennelong, a senior Eora man, who lived in the area.

== History ==
Wentworth Point is a new suburb, having been designated under this name only in 2009 and rezoned by Auburn Council from industrial to (mostly) residential use in 2013. Before the bridge was built, Wentworth Point had only two road connections to the rest of Sydney and no access to rail transport except via Olympic Park railway station, some distance away. The western part of Rhodes, facing Homebush Bay, is also a newly redeveloped area, having been turned from industrial use to commercial and residential use only after extensive remediation works due to soil contamination from its decades of industrial use, which were completed in 2011.

Linking Rhodes and Wentworth Point, the bridge was proposed by John Kinsella of Wentworth Point's developer Billbergia and designed by Wentworth Point Marina's urban designers and architects. It was designed to give Wentworth Point an additional access point by road (albeit not by car) and to allow residents to access Rhodes railway station. By improving access for the suburb, the developers were able to increase development densities in Wentworth Point. Construction of the Bennelong Bridge was approved by the Government of New South Wales in March 2013 with construction commencing in September 2014.

As a designated T-Way, the bridge is the first in the Sydney region to exclude private vehicles, exclusively carrying Transit Systems bus route 526, Busways bus route 533, Baylink Shuttle, cyclists, pedestrians, and emergency vehicles (a similar bridge already exists in Brisbane, the Eleanor Schonell Bridge, which opened in 2006). It also has the capacity to carry a future extension of the Parramatta Light Rail.

Bennelong Bridge is the first bridge to be funded entirely by property developers in return for additional development density at Wentworth Point under a Voluntary Planning Agreement between the developers and the Roads & Maritime Services.

It was inaugurated on 22 May 2016 and opened to traffic on 23 May 2016. Local state MPs John Sidoti and Luke Foley officially opened the bridge.

Despite the bridge being restricted to foot traffic and public bus routes, there have been reports of private vehicles illegally using the bridge as a shortcut. To combat this, a bus lane camera was installed in November 2016 whereby motorists illegally using the bridge are fined and gain a demerit point.

== Gallery ==
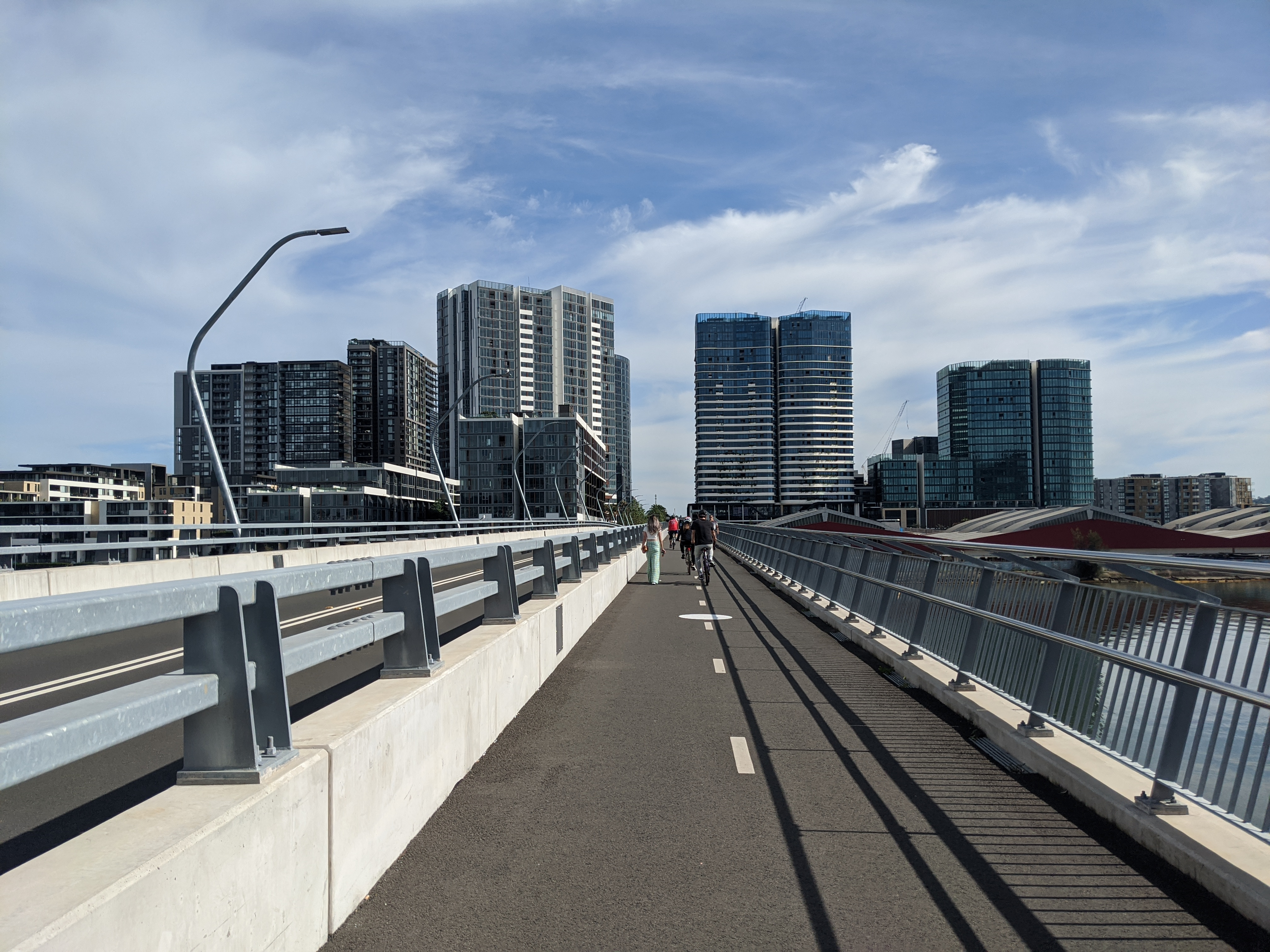
Looking towards Wentworth Point skyline

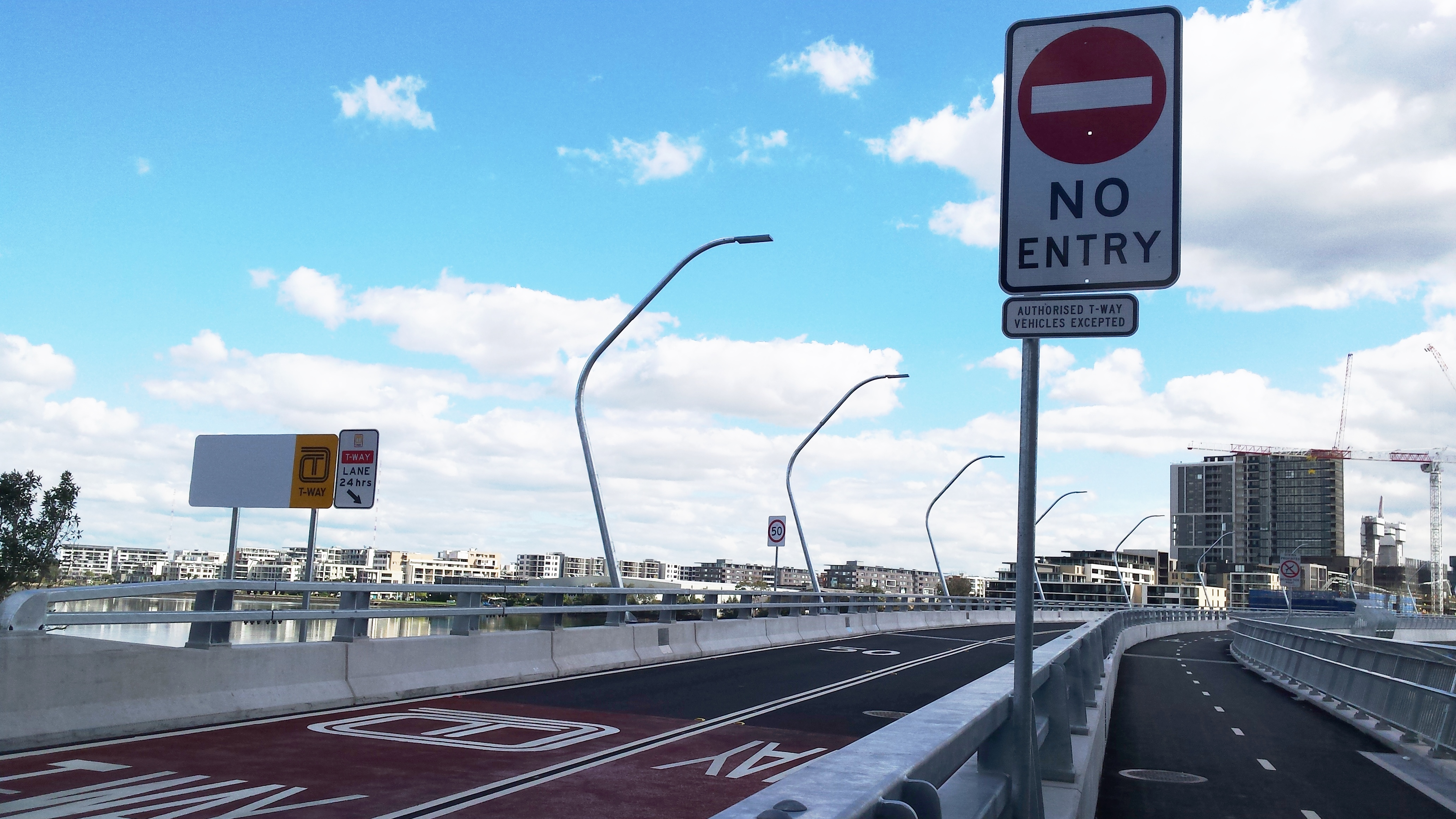
Bennelong Bridge eastern entrance, with T-Way signs.

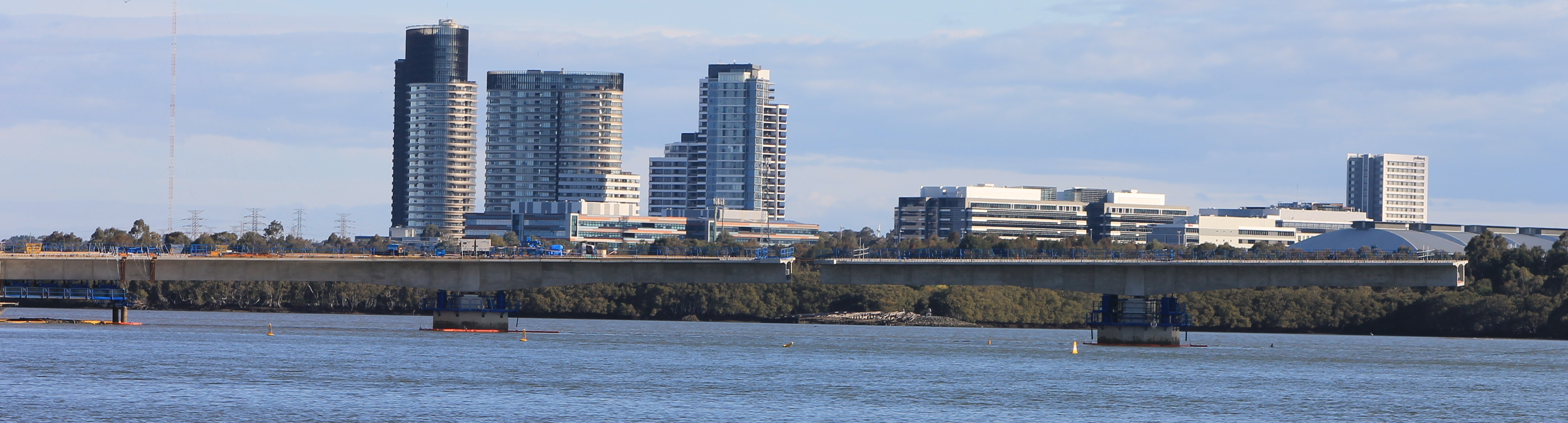
The bridge under construction.

== See also ==
- List of bridges in Sydney
