= Marina Square, Wentworth Point =

Marina Square
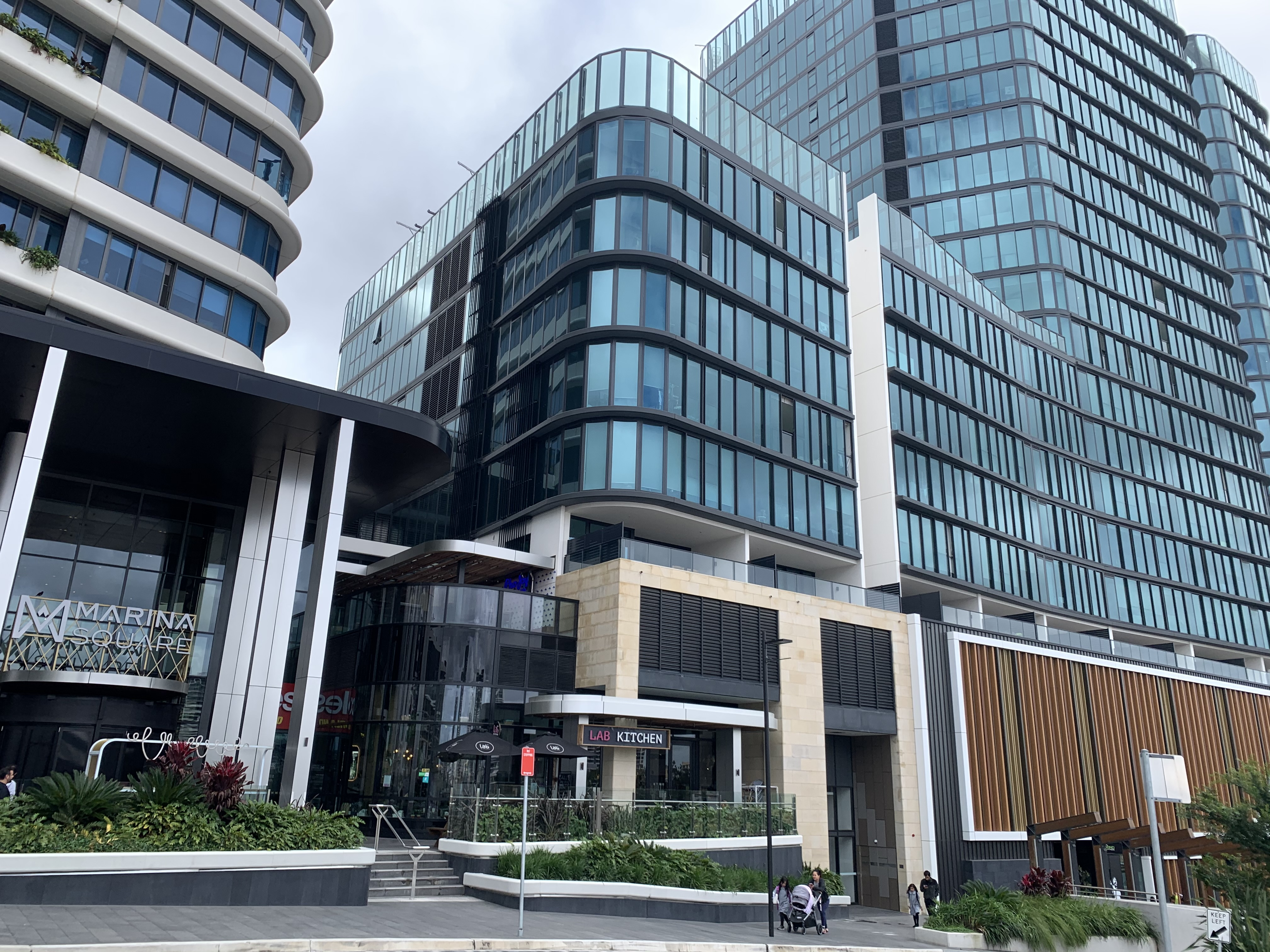
- Exterior of Marina Square in October 2020
- Location: Wentworth Point, New South Wales, Australia
- Coordinates: 33°49′29″S 151°04′44″E
- Address: 5 Footbridge Boulevard
- Opened: 21 November 2018; 7 years ago
- Manager: Billbergia
- Owner: Billbergia
- Num. of stores: 45
- Num. of anchor tenants: 1
- Floor area: 12,000 m^{2} (129,167 sq ft)
- Floors: 2
- Parking: 578 spaces
- Public transit: Sydney Olympic Park ferry wharf
- Website: marinasquare.com.au

Marina Square is a shopping centre in the suburb of Wentworth Point, in Sydney, Australia.

== Transport ==
The Parramatta River ferry services also known as the F3 service offer frequent services to Sydney Olympic Park ferry wharf which is a short walk from the centre.

Marina Square has Busways bus connections to the Sydney Olympic Park and the Inner West, as well as local surrounding suburbs. The majority of the bus service are located on Footbridge Boulevard opposite the centre. There is no railway station at Wentworth Point; the nearest station is located at Rhodes or Sydney Olympic Park.

Marina Square also has multi level car park with 578 spaces.

== History ==
Marina Square opened on 21 November 2018 on a former warehouse site as part of a mixed-use development of Wentworth Point. The centre features Coles and 45 stores including 15 restaurants. Marina Square also features 765 apartments in seven buildings up to 25 storeys high.

Marina Square won the prestigious Excellence in Construction award for Best residential & mixed-use development over $150 million at the annual 2019 NSW Master Builders award ceremony in Sydney.
