= Wentworth Point =

- Suburb
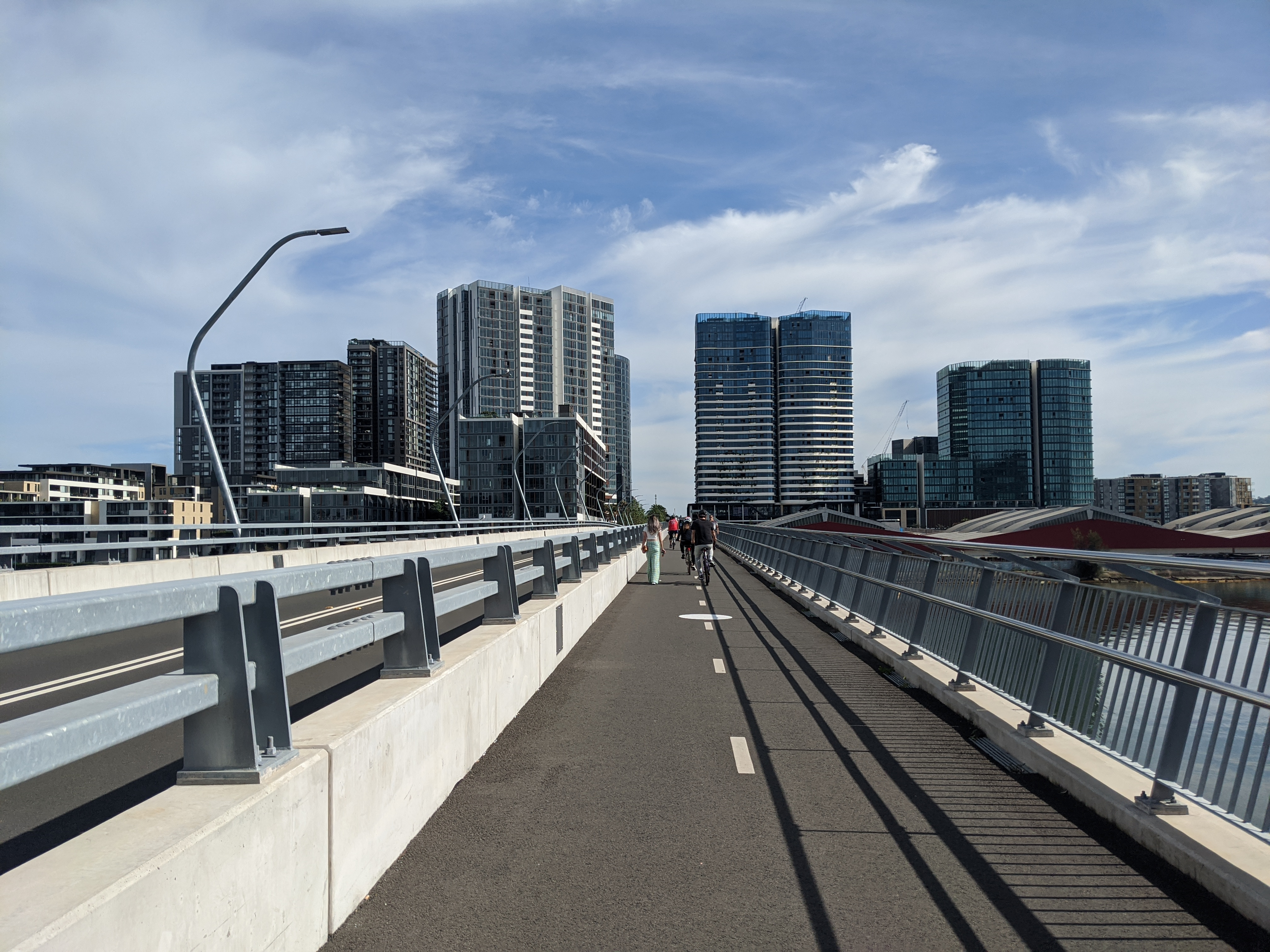
- Wentworth Point from the Bennelong Bridge

- Interactive map of Wentworth Point
- Country: Australia
- State: New South Wales
- City: Sydney
- LGA: City of Parramatta
- Location: 12 km (7.5 mi) west of Sydney CBD
- Established: 2009

Government
  - State electorate: Parramatta
  - Federal division: Reid

Area
  - Total: 0.6 km^{2} (0.23 sq mi)
- Elevation: 5 m (16 ft)

Population
  - Total: 12,703 (2021 census)
  - Density: 21,200/km^{2} (55,000/sq mi)
- Postcode: 2127
Suburbs around Wentworth Point
Melrose Park	Meadowbank	Rhodes
Newington	Wentworth Point	Concord West
Lidcombe	Sydney Olympic Park	Liberty Grove

Wentworth Point is a suburb of Sydney, in the state of New South Wales, Australia. It is located 13 kilometres west of the Sydney central business district, on the eastern edge of the local government area of City of Parramatta. It is on the western shore of Homebush Bay on the southern side of the Parramatta River. Wentworth Point is usually regarded as part of the Greater Western Sydney region, including in administrative contexts, but it is also regarded as part of the Inner West region of Sydney in some contexts, especially commercial contexts.

== History ==
This suburb was once part of the suburb of Lidcombe, known as "North Lidcombe", which was renamed "Homebush Bay" between 1989 and 2009. The name "Lidcombe" was first adopted in 1913 and is a portmanteau of the names of two mayors of former Rookwood Municipality, Frederick Lidbury and Henry Larcombe. The name "Homebush Bay" comes from the bay with a natural and artificial shoreline on the southern side of the Parramatta River. Homebush Bay is itself named after the nearby estate of "Home Bush", established in the 1800s by the colonies assistant surgeon D'Arcy Wentworth. According to local government historian Michael Jones, "Wentworth is popularly credited with having called the area after his 'home in the bush', although Homebush is also a place in Kent." Wentworth Point, the point on the western extremity of the bay, and Wentworth Bay, the nearby inlet on the western shore of Homebush Bay, are named after the Wentworth family - the bay has now disappeared due to land reclamation. Part of the present location of Wentworth Point was Mud Island, which became connected with the mainland due to land reclamation.

In the 1860s and 1870s, the arrival of the railway led to residential development to the south of Parramatta Road, in the present-day suburbs of Homebush and Strathfield. Inspired by the successes of these nearby subdivisions, the owners of the Home Bush Estate also attempted to develop the estate by subdivision. Subdivisions in the Homebush Bay area began in 1881, when parts of the former Home Bush Estate north of Parramatta Road, extending to the tip of the peninsula which later became Wentworth Point, were subdivided as the "Homebush Park Estate". In 1883, Fitzwilliam Wentworth attempted another subdivision, to be called the 'Wentworth Estate'. However, this and subsequent subdivision proposals were not successful, and other than the lots adjacent to Parramatta Road, most of the land remained unsold and was sparsely populated. Parts of the area turned to industrial use, such as a new government abattoir built in 1907.

Present-day Wentworth Point was part of the Borough of Rookwood proclaimed on 8 December 1891, which was renamed the "Municipality of Lidcombe" in 1913. The Municipality of Lidcombe merged into Auburn Council in 1948. Present-day Wentworth Point was part of the suburb of Lidcombe, and part of the area known as "North Lidcombe".

=== Industrial and commercial usage ===
Much of the modern suburb is reclaimed land, created by draining and filling in the northwestern shore of Homebush Bay which began in 1949. The northern part of the peninsula was named Wentworth Point and gazetted in 1976. After it was reclaimed from the bay, Wentworth Point was used for a variety of industrial uses.

Notable businesses include Ralph Symonds, a plywood manufacturer, which used the river as a transport route for large logs, which were then moored in Homebush Bay while awaiting processing. Other activities have included McPhee Transport depot, the former Head Office and warehouse space for Hyundai Australia and a transmission tower for Sydney radio station 2GB.

de Havilland Marine (Large Craft) was located on the waters edge at Homebush Bay. Due to a lack of new business it closed its doors in 1982. In the years prior it manufactured various large aluminium craft for both the local and international market. These included Carpentaria Class Patrol Boats for Burma & the Solomon Islands, Titan Work Boats for the New South Wales government, and the hulls of the Nepean Bell which still operates on the Nepean River in NSW.

=== Redevelopment and the Olympics ===
North Lidcombe was renamed "Homebush Bay" in 1989 and nearby parts of the peninsula began to be redeveloped in the 1990s. Prior to the move of the Royal Agricultural Society showgrounds from Moore Park to Homebush Bay (as the area of Sydney Olympic Park was then known) in 1998, much of Wentworth Point was bought by Payce Consolidated Limited. Sydney Olympic Park ferry wharf opened in 1997 at the tip of the peninsula.

=== Residential development ===
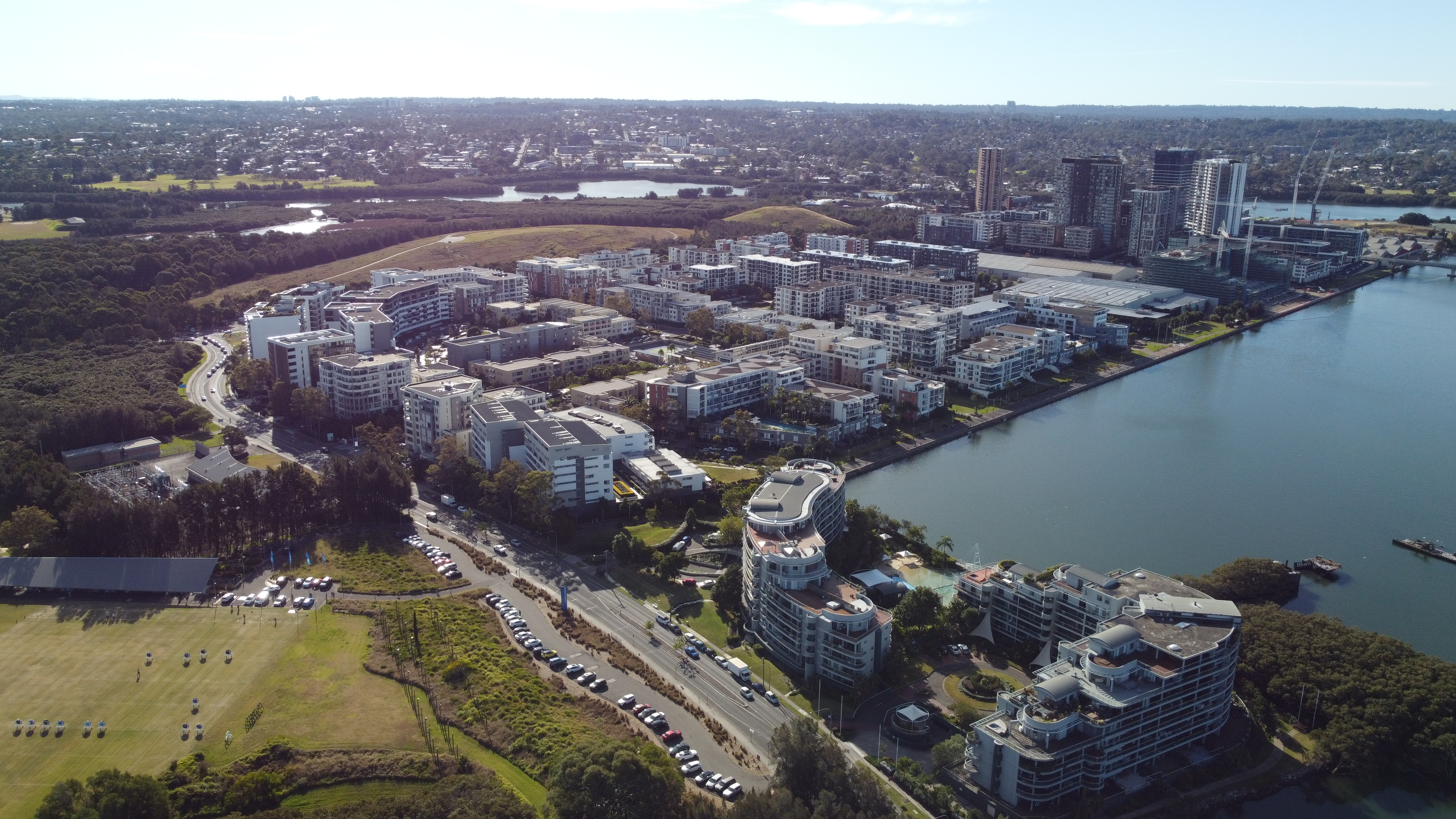
An aerial view of Wentworth Point and its surrounds

Auburn Council renamed the future waterfront residential area as the suburb of Wentworth Point on 2 October 2009 after the council sought public comment on a proposal to rename the suburb of Homebush Bay, to remove confusion with its namesake (but not adjacent) suburb of Homebush. The area encompassing Sydney Olympic Park was given autonomy as a suburb. The Carter Street industrial precinct was absorbed by the neighbouring suburb of Lidcombe, and therefore the suburb of Homebush Bay ceased to exist.

Wentworth Point was rezoned from industrial use to residential use in 2013. As well as residential development, the plan called for cultural and commercial development in the new suburb.

Auburn Council was suspended in 2016 due to dysfunction, and later in 2016 it was abolished, with different parts of the former council area merged into different councils. Wentworth Point became part of the City of Parramatta. Media reports prior to the final merger decision suggested that some residents wanted Wentworth Point to instead be allocated to the City of Canada Bay.

Most of Wentworth Point is now zoned for medium to high density residential development. The new Wentworth Point Public School opened in 2018. Reflecting the quick increase in population, the school's enrolment has changed from 50% of capacity in 2018 to 117% in 2021.

On 17 July 2023, the suburb boundary was amended to include the "Jewel Residences" and the adjacent Sydney Olympic Park ferry wharf on the northern side of Burroway Road, as well as the "Sanctuary" development area on the western side of Hill Road. These were previously part of Sydney Olympic Park.

Starting 2025 a new high school has opened next to Wentworth Point P.S. called Wentworth Point High School. It is going to open only for year 7 but will continue to grow in the coming years.

== Commercial areas ==
Wentworth Point has some small shops, cafes and restaurants.

Marina Square is a shopping centre that opened on 21 November 2018 and was built by Australian developer Billbergia. The centre has over 40 shops including a Coles supermarket.

A section of the suburb, at 37-39 Hill Road, remains in active industrial use. This industrial estate stretches across the whole width of the suburb from Hill Road to the waterfront, which effectively cuts the suburb of Wentworth Point in two, with no road connection between the northern and southern sections other than by going via Hill Road in the neighbouring suburb of Sydney Olympic Park.

NSW Maritime owns about 18 hectares of land at the northern end of the point. This land has been subject to proposals for marine related development including boat storage.

== Population ==
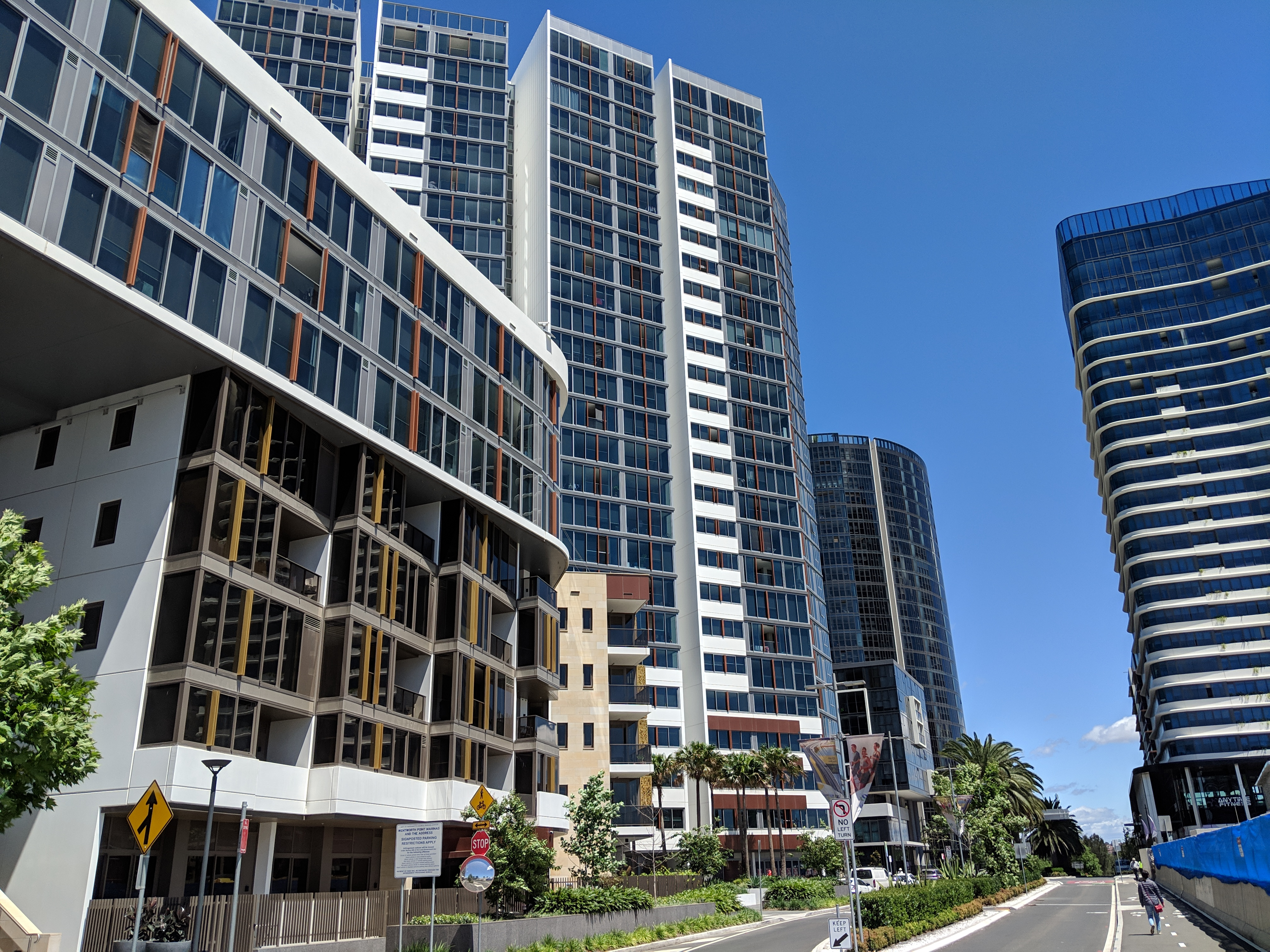
Main street through the centre of Wentworth Point

In the 2021 Census, there were 12,703 people in Wentworth Point, an increase of 81.6% compared to the 6,994 people counted in the 2016 Census. 34.6% of people were born in Australia. The next most common countries of birth were China 21.0%, South Korea 8.1%, India 3.8%, Iran 2.0% and Philippines 2.0%. The most common reported ancestries were Chinese 31.6%, English 11.9%, Korean 10.5%, Australian 9.2% and Indian 4.9%. 32.1% of people only spoke English at home. Other languages spoken at home included Mandarin 23.0%, Korean 9.8%, Cantonese 5.1%, Arabic 3.5% and Persian 2.0%. The most common responses for religion were No Religion 46.9%, Catholic 15.1%, Islam 7.0%, Not stated 6.0% and Buddhism 4.5%. Median weekly household income was $2,035, higher than the New South Wales median of $1,829.

== Recreation ==
Cycle paths extend through Sydney Olympic Parklands used by cyclists, runners and walkers. The Bennelong Bridge creates a bay run or cycle loop around Homebush Bay. A shorter 6 kilometre loop through Bicentennial Park or a longer 12 kilometre loop through to Silverwater Bridge are available. The wreck of SS Ayrfield on Homebush Bay is proximate to the suburb's shores.

Kayaking, rowing and dragon boating can be seen inside Homebush Bay, but water access and boat storage facilities are limited. There is a recreation club in Wentworth Point which has an indoor heated pool, an outdoor recreational pool, gym and tennis courts. A wide range of other recreation facilities are available at nearby Sydney Olympic Park.

== Transport ==
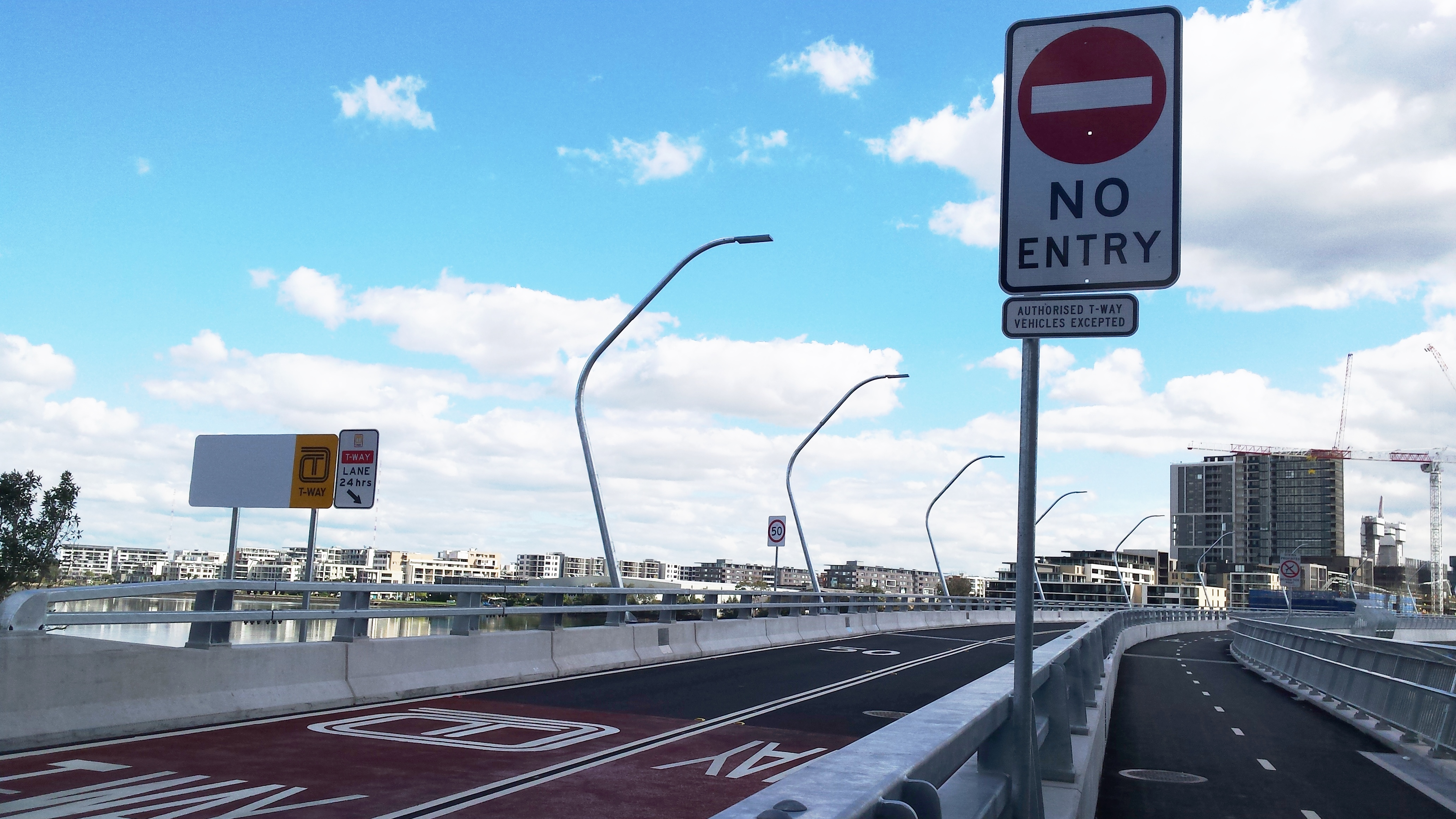
Bennelong Bridge serves as a pedestrian and bus only connection to Rhodes station

Wentworth Point is served by bus. The 526 bus services Wentworth Point from Burwood to Rhodes in both directions. The 533 bus services Wentworth Point from Chatswood to Olympic Park in both directions. An additional local shuttle bus started on 22 May 2016.

Sydney Olympic Park ferry wharf is at the northern end of Wentworth Point. The wharf is served by Parramatta River ferry services. Regular services run to Circular Quay, Darling Harbour and Parramatta. The wharf was upgraded to have two docks and faster transitions in 2015.

Until 2016, Wentworth Point was relatively isolated by road. Because it is surrounded by parklands in the west and south and by water in the north and east, it was only accessible by road from the rest of Sydney by two roads, Hill Road which connected it to Lidcombe, and Bennelong Parkway, which connected it to Sydney Olympic Park and the A3 arterial road. Moreover, the northern and southern sections of Wentworth Point are not accessible to each other, except by going via Hill Road in neighbouring Sydney Olympic Park. Road access to the northern section was improved when the 300-metre (984 ft) Bennelong Bridge across Homebush Bay opened in May 2016, making it easier for residents to access shops and the railway station at Rhodes. However, the bridge roadway can only be used by buses and emergency service vehicles. The bridge also includes a pathway for cyclists and pedestrians.

There are no train services to Wentworth Point; the closest stations are Rhodes and Olympic Park.

Stage 2 of the Parramatta Light Rail is a proposed light rail link between Westmead and Sydney Olympic Park via Parramatta, and would pass adjacent to the suburb on the western side. The project would include the construction of a bridge across the Parramatta River, between Sydney Olympic Park and Melrose Park.
