= Rhodes, New South Wales =

Rhodes
- Suburb
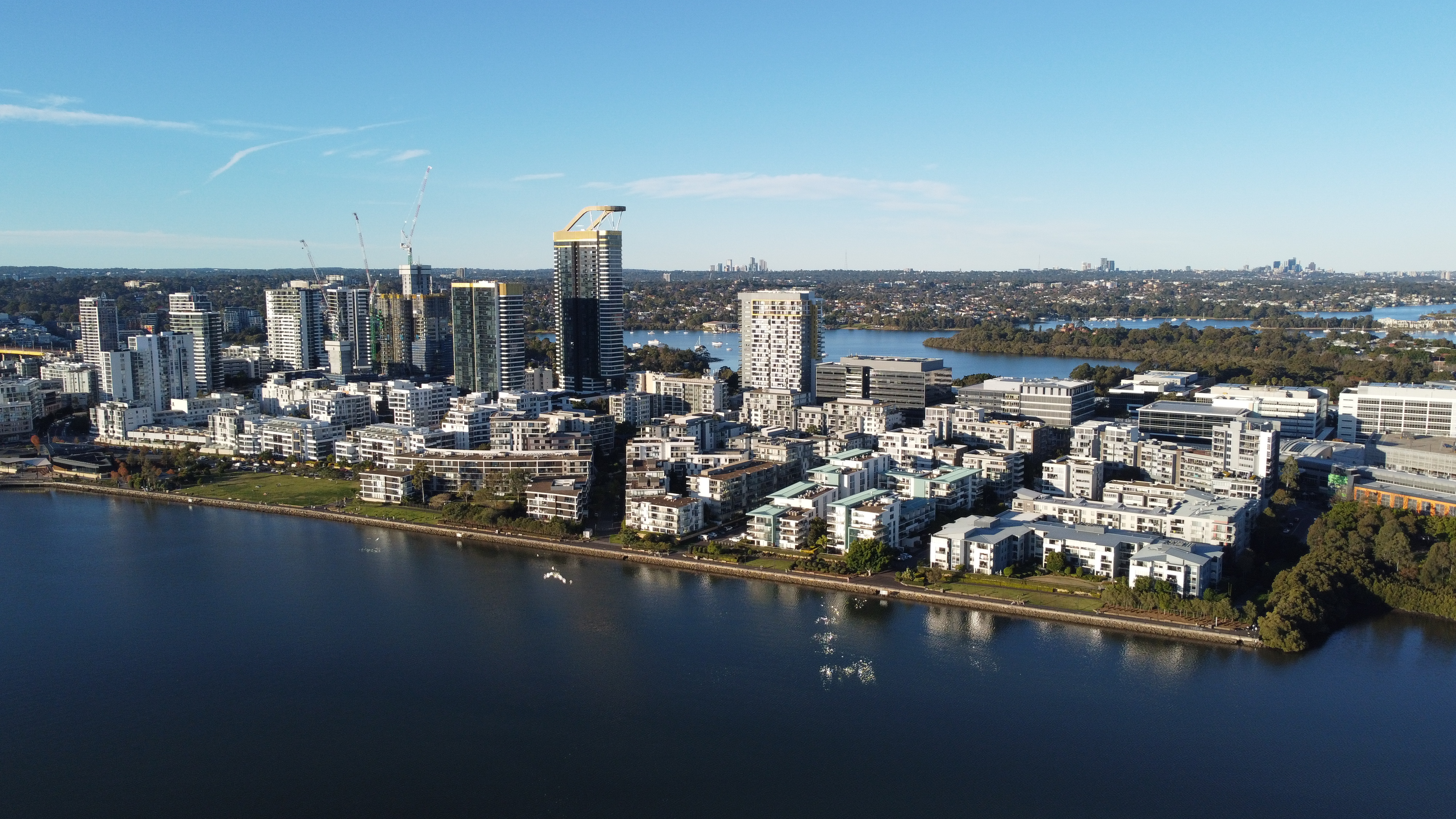
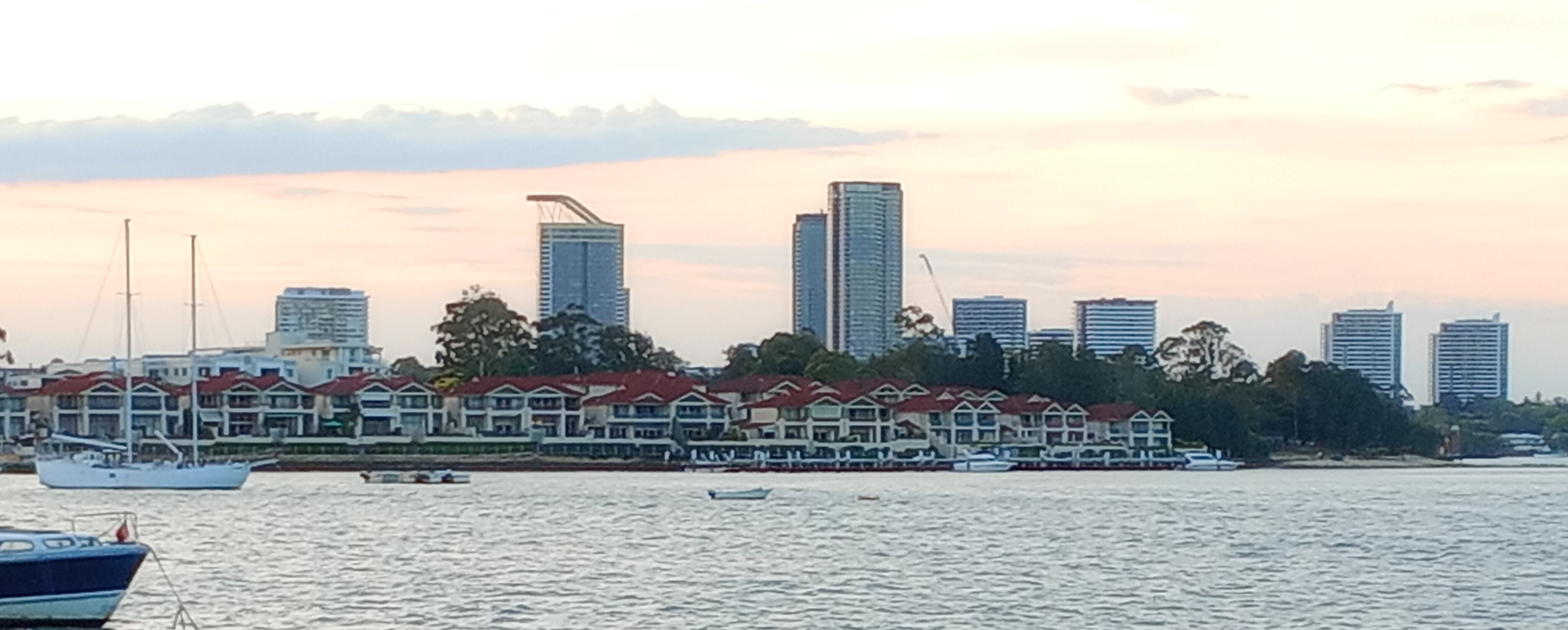
- Aerial view of Rhodes and its surrounds Rhodes Skyline

- Interactive map of Rhodes
- Country: Australia
- State: New South Wales
- City: Sydney
- LGA: City of Canada Bay
- Location: 12 km (7.5 mi) west of Sydney CBD

Government
  - State electorate: Drummoyne
  - Federal division: Reid

Area
  - Total: 1.0 km^{2} (0.39 sq mi)
- Elevation: 11 m (36 ft)

Population
  - Total: 11,453 (SAL 2021)
- Postcode: 2138
Suburbs around Rhodes
Meadowbank	Ryde	Putney
Wentworth Point	Rhodes	Concord West
Sydney Olympic Park	Liberty Grove	Concord West

Rhodes is an Inner West suburb of Sydney, in the state of New South Wales, Australia. Rhodes is located 12 kilometres west of the Sydney central business district, in the local government area of the City of Canada Bay. It was formerly part of Concord Municipality until a merger with Drummoyne Council to form Canada Bay in December 2000.

Rhodes sits on a peninsula between Bray Bay and Homebush Bay, on the southern bank of the Parramatta River and is located about 3 kilometres from Sydney Olympic Park.

Since 2016, Rhodes has been connected to the residential suburb of Wentworth Point, on the western side of Homebush Bay, by the Bennelong Bridge.

== Description ==
Rhodes is roughly separated into three sections by the Main North railway line and the A3 arterial road, both of which run north–south and cross the Parramatta River at Rhodes.

The eastern section, east of Concord Road (which forms the A3 in this section), is predominantly single family detached houses and parkland. It features two residential streets, Cropley Street and Llewellyn Street, which front the Parramatta River.

The central section, between the Concord Road and the Main Northern railway line, is mixed commercial, single family detached dwelling residential, warehouse/office developments and community facilities. It includes: Rhodes Corporate Park, built on the site of the former Tullochs Phoenix Iron Works; two office blocks with some retail opposite the station; the Rhodes NSW Fire Brigades station (staffed by retained as opposed to full-time officers); single dwelling residences; the former Rhodes Public School (now a community centre); a Coptic Orthodox church and facilities; the Masonic Aged Care Hostel; warehouse/office development along the river; and the First Yaralla Sea Scouts.

The western section, west of the railway line, features new developments on the former chemical and industrial sites, and includes: the Rhodes Waterside Shopping Centre; many new (2007) apartment blocks; and a public foreshore walkway with two small parks (one incomplete Jan 2010). This area was planned by the NSW Government under Sydney Regional Environment Plan No 29.

== History ==
Rhodes was named after the home of an early resident, Thomas Walker (1791–1861), which was built on the north-eastern side of the peninsula. Walker named his property Rhodes after his grandmother's home, Rhodes Hall, in Leeds, England. The house was demolished in 1919, when the land was purchased by the John Darling Flour Mills, later owned by Allied Feeds Limited.

Industry invaded the once picturesque and heavily forested isthmus in 1911 when Messrs. G & C. Hoskins established a large foundry specialising in the manufacture of cast iron pipes for gas and city water reticulation purposes. In 1930 their operations moved to Port Kembla, and in 1935 the site was taken over by CSR. During the period from about 1930 to the mid-1980s, the western part of the suburb between Homebush Bay and the railway line was taken up by chemical manufacturing.

The main manufacturers were Berger Paints, CSR Chemicals, Union Carbide, and Allied Feeds.

The former Tulloch Limited Phoenix Iron Works were located between the railway line and Concord Road, south of Mary Street. They gave their name to Tulloch Avenue and Phoenix Avenue. This is now the site of the Hewlett-Packard offices in Sydney. Tullochs manufactured rolling stock for the New South Wales Government Railways.

On 29 November 1986 an explosion at ICI's Rhodes plant sent a ball of fire and chemicals over an area 100 by 50 metres. Five men were burned to death and 21 others were injured.

In October 2010, the City of Canada Bay approved a plan which would allow up to 5 buildings of 25 storeys in this Western section. The expected population in this western section is over 11,000, making it one of the most densely populated areas of Sydney outside the CBD. There are no facilities for school education within this area.

On 20 October 2025, the $80 million dollar Rhodes Recreation Centre opened to the public. The three-level podium sits below two Billbergia residential tower blocks. The centre has indoor courts, a gym, community space, early childhood education centre, and a cafe. The most popular feature in the initial public consultation was a swimming pool, but that was cut by the council due to 'financial challenges' posed by the centre's 'configuration'.

=== Major remediation ===
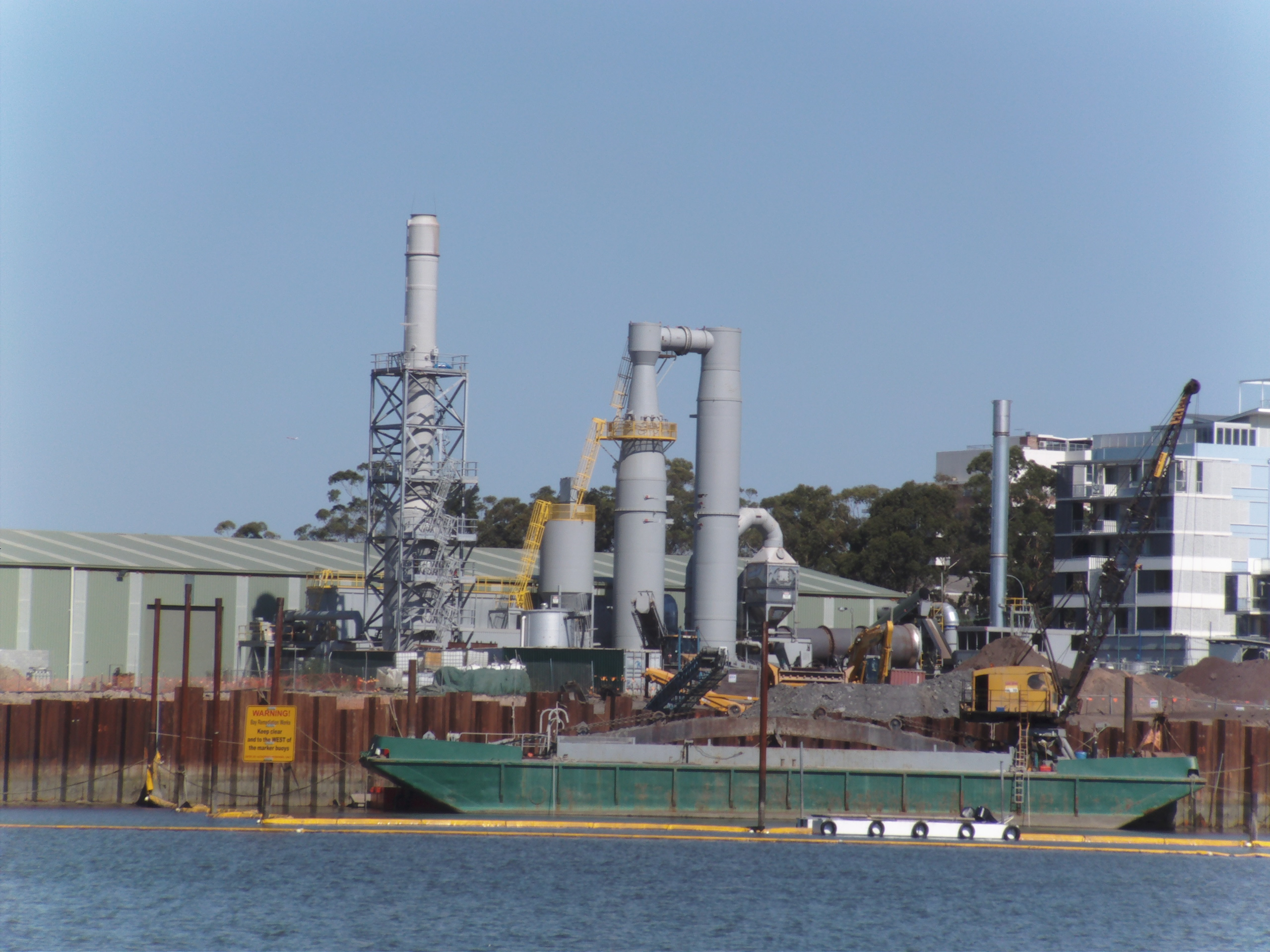
Remediation by soil desorbtion and incineration

With the exception of the area bounded by Mary, Walker, Marquet and Gauthorpe Streets, almost all of the land on the western side of the railway line has needed remediation. Most of the sediments along the sea wall from Oulton Avenue to the northern tip of the peninsula also require(d) remediation. The balance of the bay remains contaminated by numerous chemicals including phthalates, dioxins, lead, heavy metals and polycyclic aromatic hydrocarbons (coal tars), but to a lesser extent than the areas closer to the sea wall on the eastern shore of the bay.

The remediation of the former Union Carbide site, the former Allied Feeds site and a strip of heavily dioxin contaminated sediments in Homebush Bay, have been the subject of extensive analysis, investigations and community activism, including by the Rhodes Peninsula Group. The remediation is approved and monitored by the Department of Planning & Environment with extensive community consultation. A strip of sediment in Homebush Bay between 40 and 100 metres wide and about 850 metres long along the eastern foreshore is being excavated and processed by direct thermal desorption and incineration to remove dioxins and other volatile organics. The remediation proposals were subject to a Parliamentary Inquiry by the NSW Standing Committee on State Development Committee. The remediation was completed in February 2011.

The former Berger Paints site near Oulton Avenue, and the CSR Chemicals / Orica Chemicals site on the southern side of Mary Street west of the railway, were also remediated. The Rhodes Waterside Shopping centre is located on the former Berger Paints site. Apartments are being developed on the former Orica Chemicals site, with commercial buildings along the railway line. Apartments are being developed on the former Union Carbide site and the former Allied Feeds site.

== Heritage listings ==
Rhodes has a number of heritage-listed sites, including:

- Main Northern railway: Meadowbank Rail Bridge over Parramatta River
- Blaxland Road: Rhodes railway station

== Transport ==
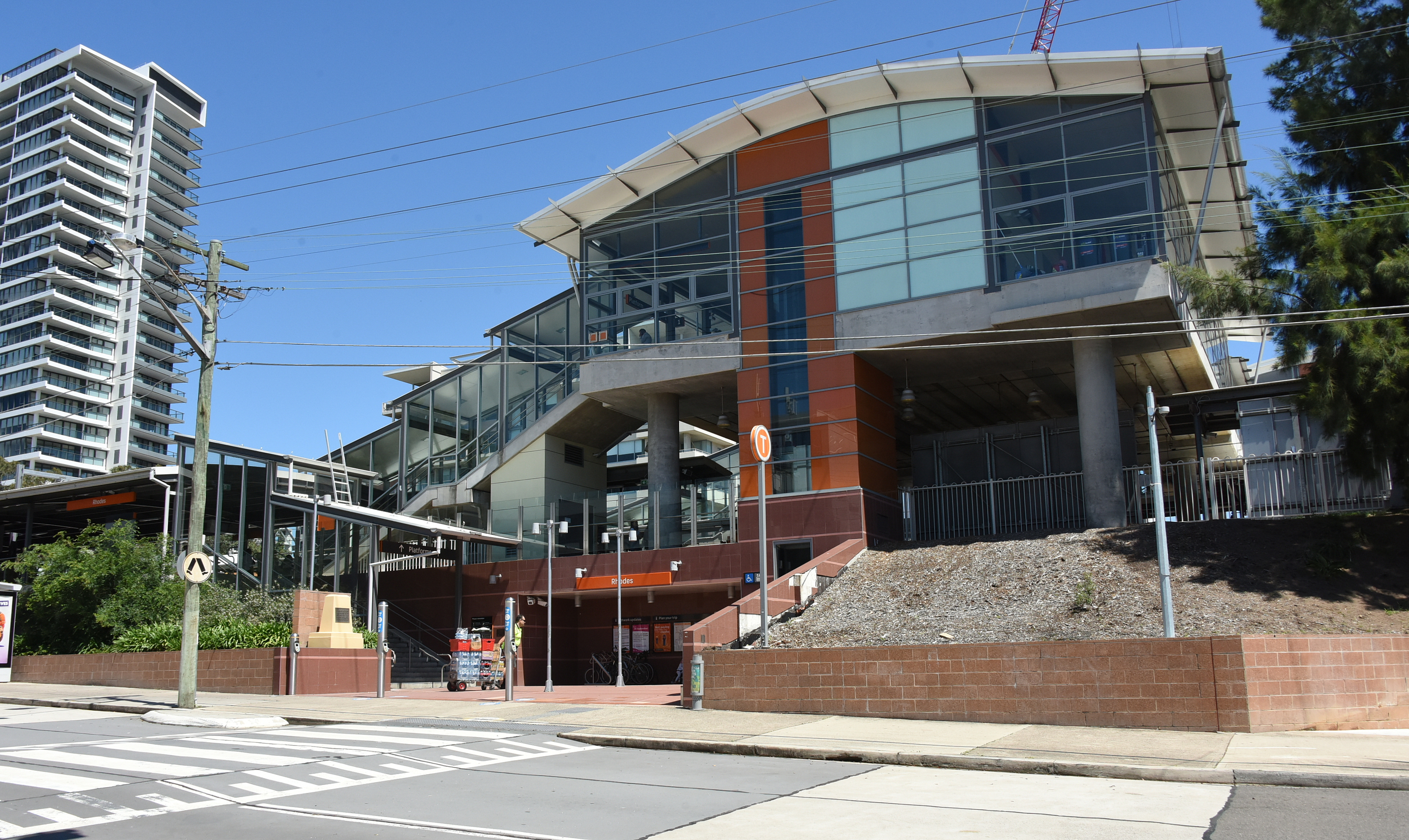
Rhodes railway station

=== Railway ===
Rhodes railway station is on the T9 Northern Line of the Sydney Trains network. The station is about 30 minutes from the Sydney central business district by rail.

=== Buses ===
Busways and Transit Systems provide services along Concord Road and Rider Boulevard. The Baylink Shuttle provides services along Gauthorpe Street and Walker Street.

=== Road network ===
The Ryde Bridge links Rhodes to Ryde, across the Parramatta River. Rhodes is on a major north–south road system through the suburbs of Sydney, the A3. It is close to two main east–west links, Victoria Road to the north and the M4 Western Motorway/Parramatta Road/City West Link to the south.

==== Bennelong Bridge ====
The Bennelong Bridge across Homebush Bay for buses, emergency services, cyclists and pedestrians opened in May 2016 from Gauthorpe Street in Rhodes to Footbridge Boulevarde in Wentworth Point. The bridge will affect access by boats into the southern part of the bay and its potential use for recreational sailing, although kayaking would be less affected except near the Rhodes shore.

=== Cycleways ===
A number of Council and Roads & Maritime Services cycleways run through Rhodes, predominantly along Llewellyn and Walker Streets, joined by Leeds Street and an underpass under Ryde Bridge. There are shared paths along the Homebush Bay foreshore (incomplete in 2010) and immediately to the west of the railway behind the shopping centre and offices in Rider Boulevarde. Cycleways run west to Silverwater Bridge and on to Parramatta on both sides of the river. John Whitton Bridge, which is the former railway bridge joining Rhodes and Meadowbank, has a cycleway and pedestrian walkway. There are links to the cycleway running predominantly along the Cooks River to Botany Bay.

=== Proposed ferry wharf ===
In 2015, Transport for NSW proposed adding a Rhodes ferry wharf to the Parramatta River line. Safety concerns resulted in the project being deferred in 2016. The project is still in planning stages as of August 2023.

== Commercial areas ==
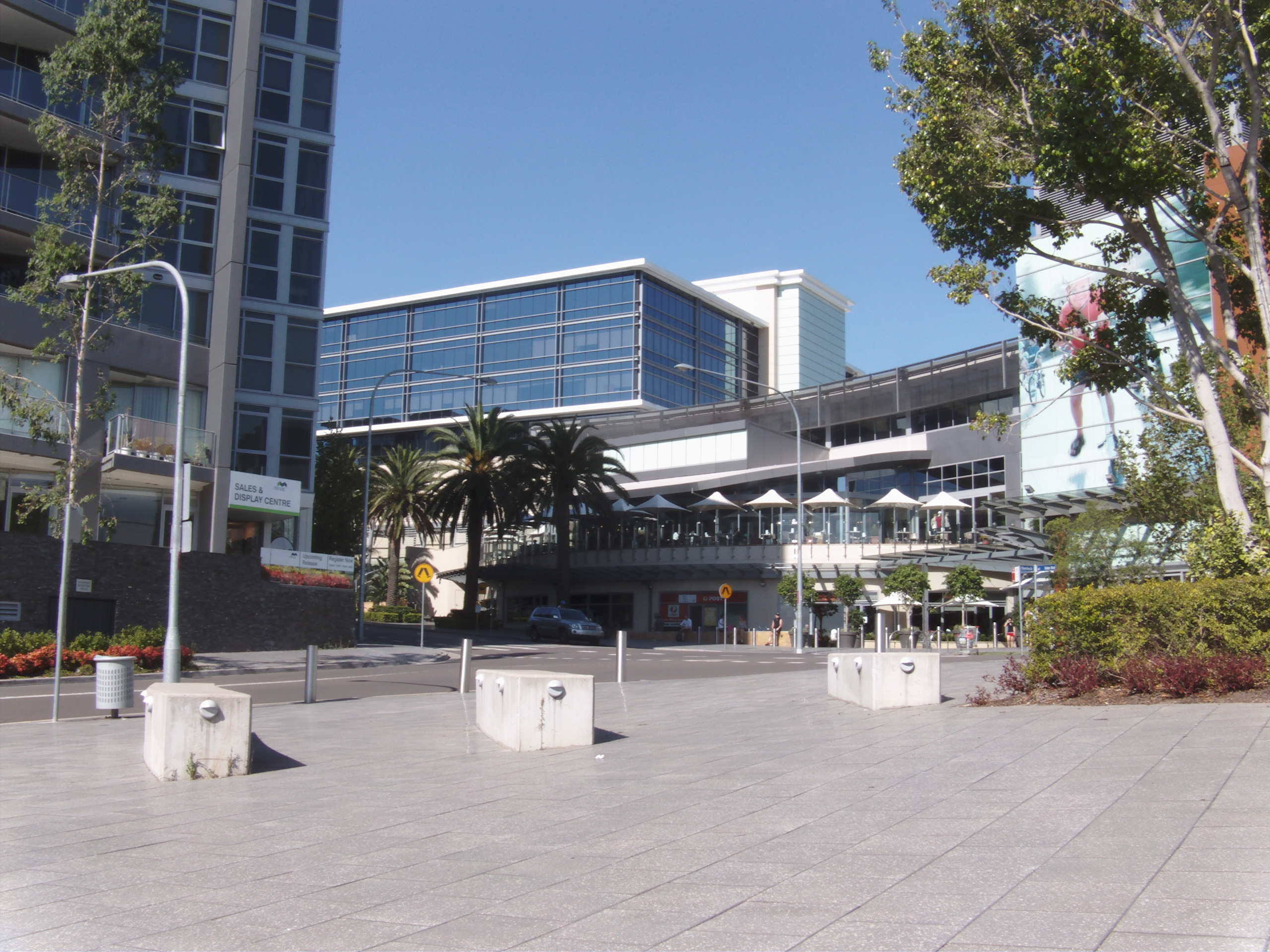
Rhodes Waterside

Rhodes features a mixture of single dwelling residential, high density residential, major retail developments such as Rhodes Waterside, Rhodes Central, commercial, warehouse/office developments and community facilities.

There are a number of commercial buildings in the Rhodes Redevelopment Area west of the railway, mainly in Rider Boulevarde, housing substantial businesses such as Australian Associated Press. The Rhodes Corporate Park developed by Australand is located at the corner of Concord Road and Homebush Bay Drive on the eastern side of the railway line and includes businesses such as Citibank and Nestle.

== Residential areas ==
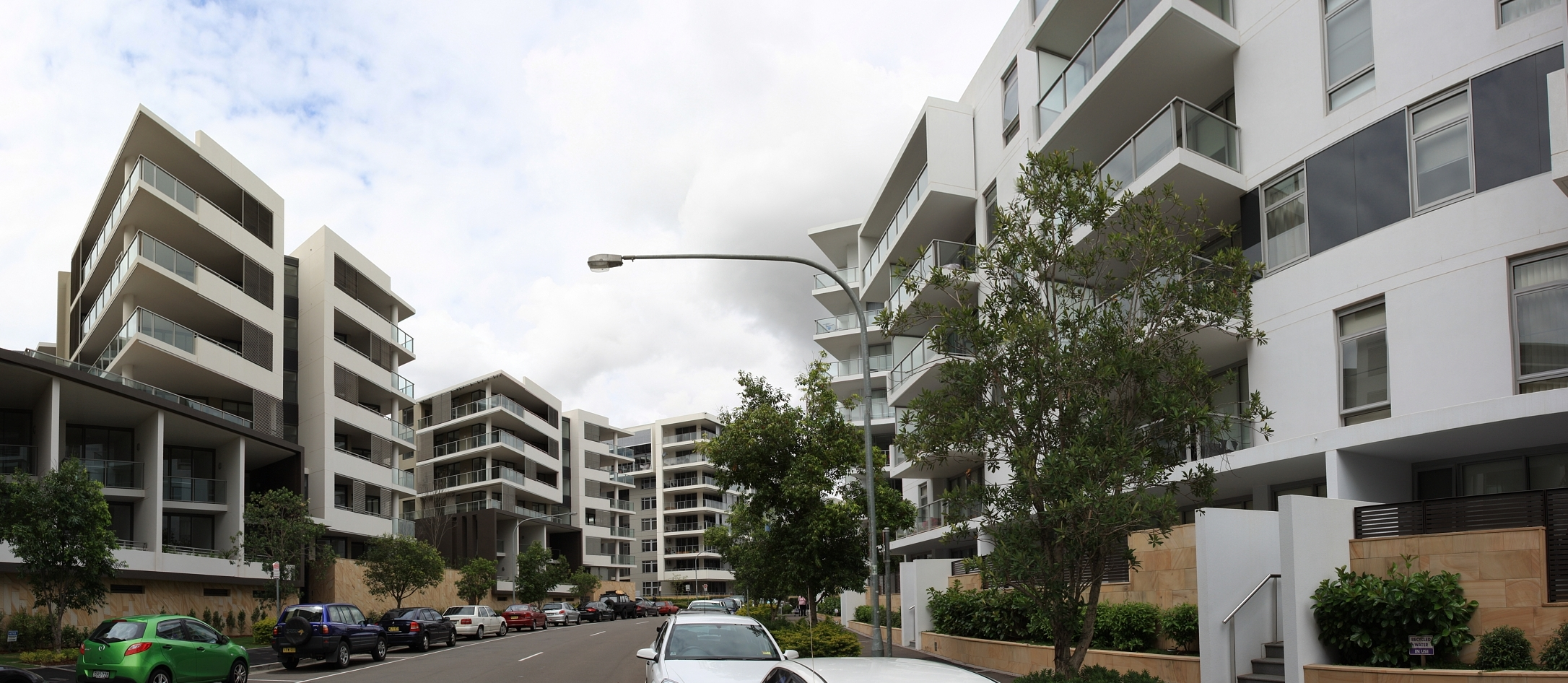
Apartments in Rhodes

While nearly all of the residential areas on the eastern side of the railway line are low to medium density of one or two storeys, the residential area on the western side of the railway line is high density, with most of the area zoned for high density residential development with buildings of four to eight storeys. There is an area of mixed high density residential and business opposite the railway station in Walker Street. The original planning instrument for the Rhodes Redevelopment Area provided for over 7,500 people to live west of the railway line in Rhodes, but with 2009/10 Council amendments, the projected population is now over 11,000 when redevelopment is completed.

== Community ==
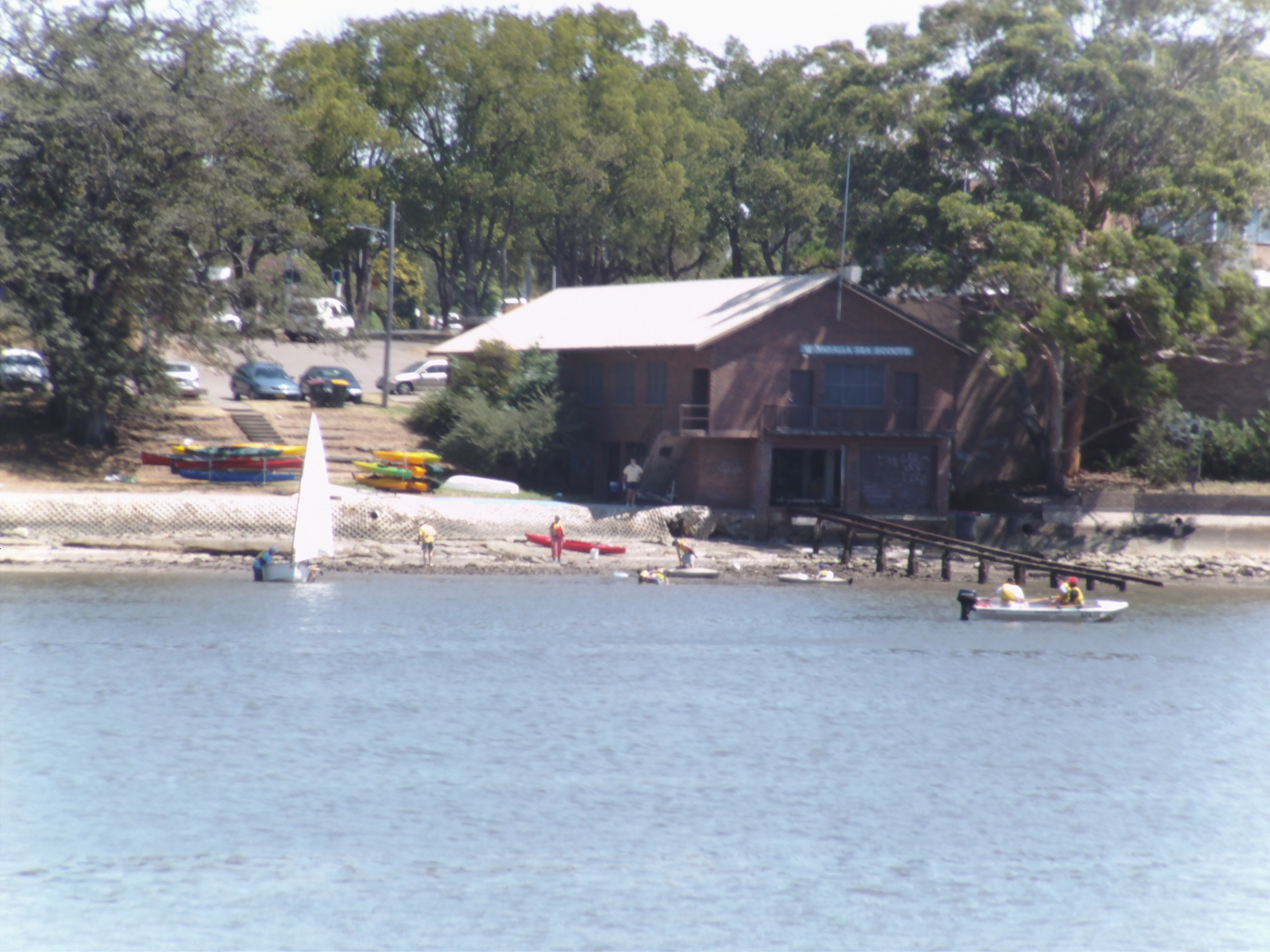
First Yaralla Sea Scouts, near Ryde Bridge

Rhodes has one of the last Fire & Rescue NSW stations staffed wholly by paid volunteers in inner metropolitan Sydney. It was established on land owned by the McIlwaine family, (for whom McIlwaine Park is named). Three generations of the McIlwaine family have been Captain of the Brigade. The fire station is located on Concord Road near the intersection with Mary Street on the eastern side of the peninsula.

First Yaralla Sea Scouts has a hall near Ryde Bridge. The hall was rebuilt in brick after the original hall was destroyed by fire. Dragon boat paddling also takes place from this site. The Concord Rhodes Open Sailing Club (now Concord Ryde Sailing Club) operated from King George V park until relocated to Waterview Street Putney (near Yaralla Street) to allow for the building of the duplication of Ryde Bridge.

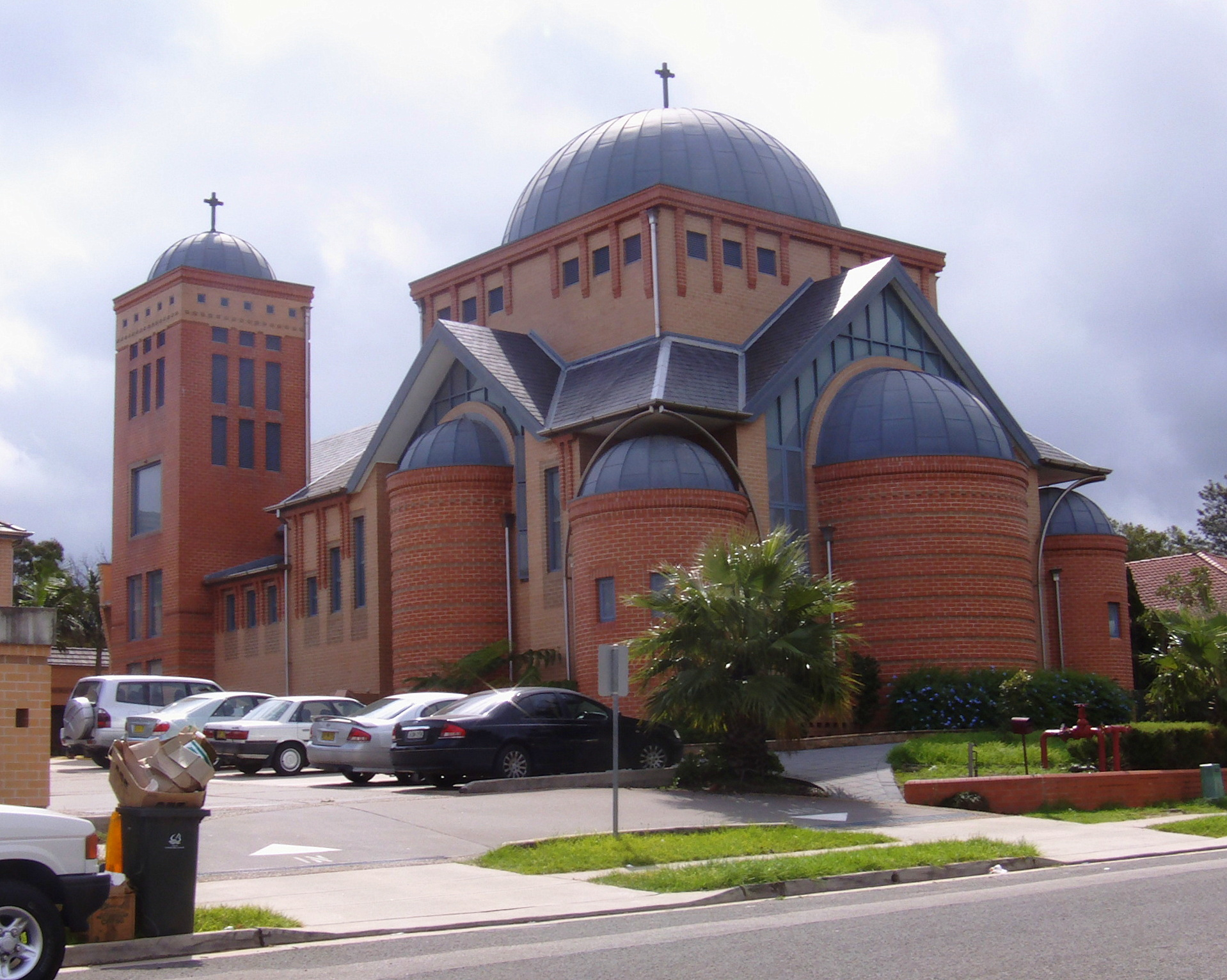
Rhodes Coptic Orthodox Church

Rhodes Community Centre is located in Blaxland Road in the former two teacher Rhodes Primary School buildings. Most primary school children in the area now attend Concord West Public School, Strathfield North Public School or Saint Ambrose at Concord West. A community building is planned for the central Homebush Bay foreshore park on the western side of the peninsula and is expected to be completed in 2012.

There is an aged care hostel in Cavell Avenue, built largely on the former Rhodes Public School playground. A Coptic Orthodox church has been built on the site of a former church of another denomination, and additional parish facilities added.

Rhodes Residents Association has represented the community, particularly to local government, for over 20 years. Rhodes Peninsula Group also represents community interests in relation to the Rhodes Remediation and Redevelopment and associated issues and infrastructure.

=== Demographics ===
Historical population
Year	Pop.	±%
2001	734	—
2006	1,668	+127.2%
2011	5,679	+240.5%
2016	11,906	+109.6%
2021	11,453	−3.8%

At the 2021 census, the suburb of Rhodes recorded a population of 11,453 people. Of these:

- Age distribution: Residents were younger than the country overall. Their median age was 32 years, compared to the national median of 38 years. The disparity is most marked for people aged in the range 20–29 years, which made up 25.5% of the residents of Rhodes, but only 13.2% nationally. Children aged under 15 years made up 12.2% of the population (the national average was 18.2%) and people aged 65 years and over made up 6.3% of the population (the national average was 17.2%).
- Ethnic diversity : 23.5% of people were born in Australia; the next most common country of birth was China (excluding Special Administrative Regions and Taiwan) 27.7%; the next most common countries of birth were South Korea 9.5%, India 6.1%, Hong Kong (Special Administrative Region of China) 3.6%, and the Philippines 2.1%. The most common reported ancestries included Chinese 43.2%, Korean 11.6%, English 7.5%, Indian 7.4% and Australian 5.5%. 21.0% of people only spoke English at home; other languages spoken at home included Mandarin 30.2%, Korean 10.6%, Cantonese 8.3%, Hindi 3.2%, and Arabic 2.1%.
- Finances: The median household weekly income was $2,183, compared to the national median of $1,746. This difference is also reflected in real estate, with the median mortgage payment being $2,500 per month, compared to the national median of $1,863.
- Housing: The great majority (95.1%) of occupied private dwellings were flats or apartments, 3.2% were separate houses and 1.5% were row or terrace houses. The average household size was 2.2 people.
- Religion: The most common religious affiliation was No Religion 50.1%; the next most common response was Catholic at 12.3%, along with Hinduism at 6.7%, followed by Buddhism; 6.1% of reponsdents elected not to disclose their religion.

== Parramatta River at Rhodes ==
The river is generally regarded as safe for secondary contact such as sailing. The river around Rhodes is used by rowing crews for training, predominantly in early mornings, late afternoons and on weekends. Sailing from Concord and Ryde Sailing Club can be seen in the distance from McIlwaine and Brays Bay Parks at Rhodes on Saturdays from 1 September to 30 April. Dragon boating is available from near Yaralla Sea Scouts near Ryde Bridge. There is a boat ramp at the northern end of Blaxland Road. There are other ramps at Wharf Road, West Meadowbank and on the eastern side of Silverwater Bridge on the southern side of the river.

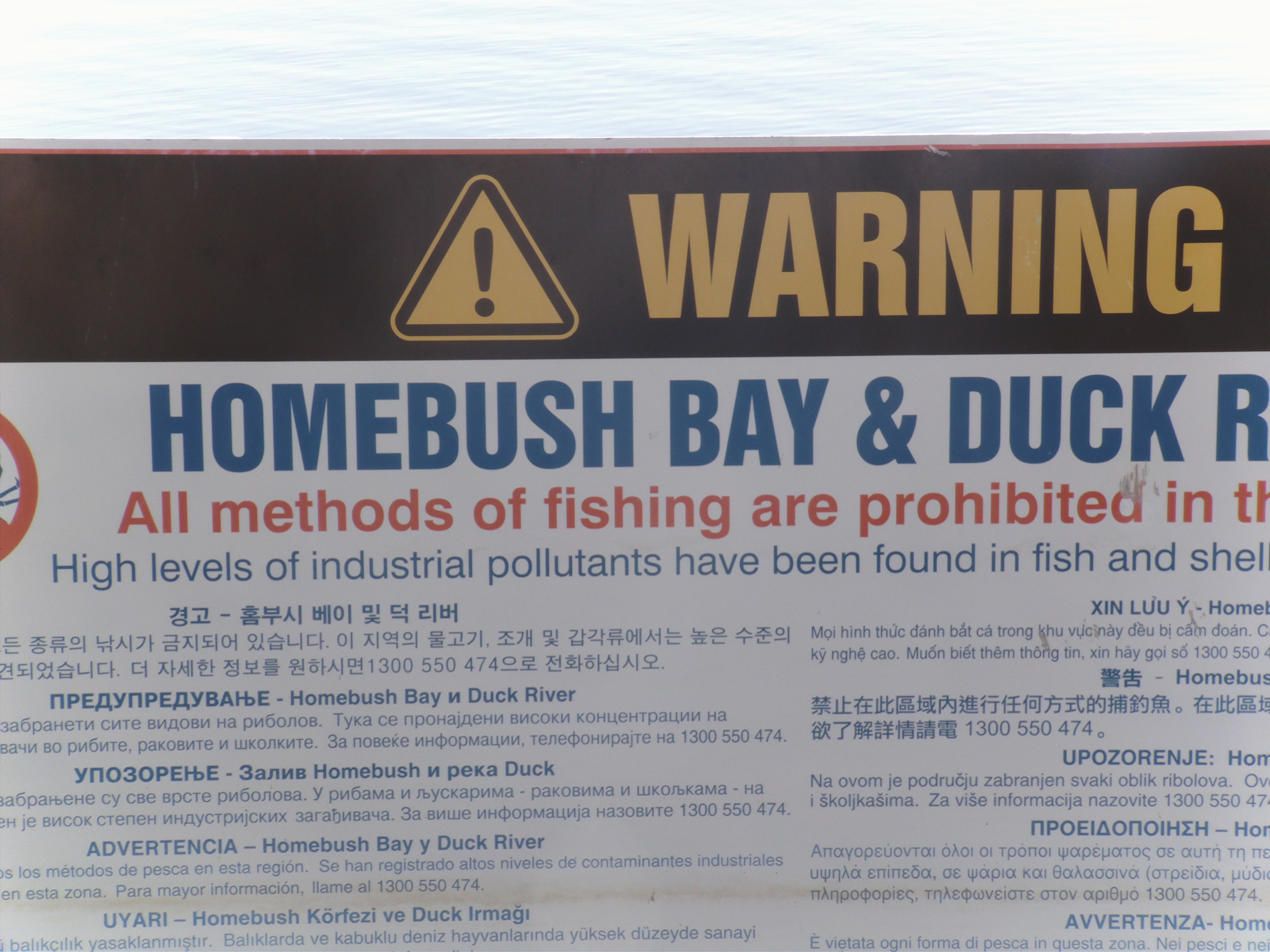
No fishing in Homebush Bay

Fishing is banned in all of Homebush Bay (including from Rhodes and Wentworth Point).

=== Proposed Wentworth Point marina ===
Transport for NSW, a New South Wales Government agency, owns most of the land on Wentworth Point north of Burroway Road on both sides of Hill Road. Transport for NSW has announced plans for a major boat storage facility with complementary maritime facilities.

=== Fire ===
The Rhodes community is protected by the Rhodes, Concord and Ryde Fire Brigades. Rhodes Fire Brigade is one of only three remaining Retained (paid volunteer) Fire Brigades in inner Sydney. Rhodes Fire Brigade celebrated its 90th anniversary in 2011.

== Parks ==
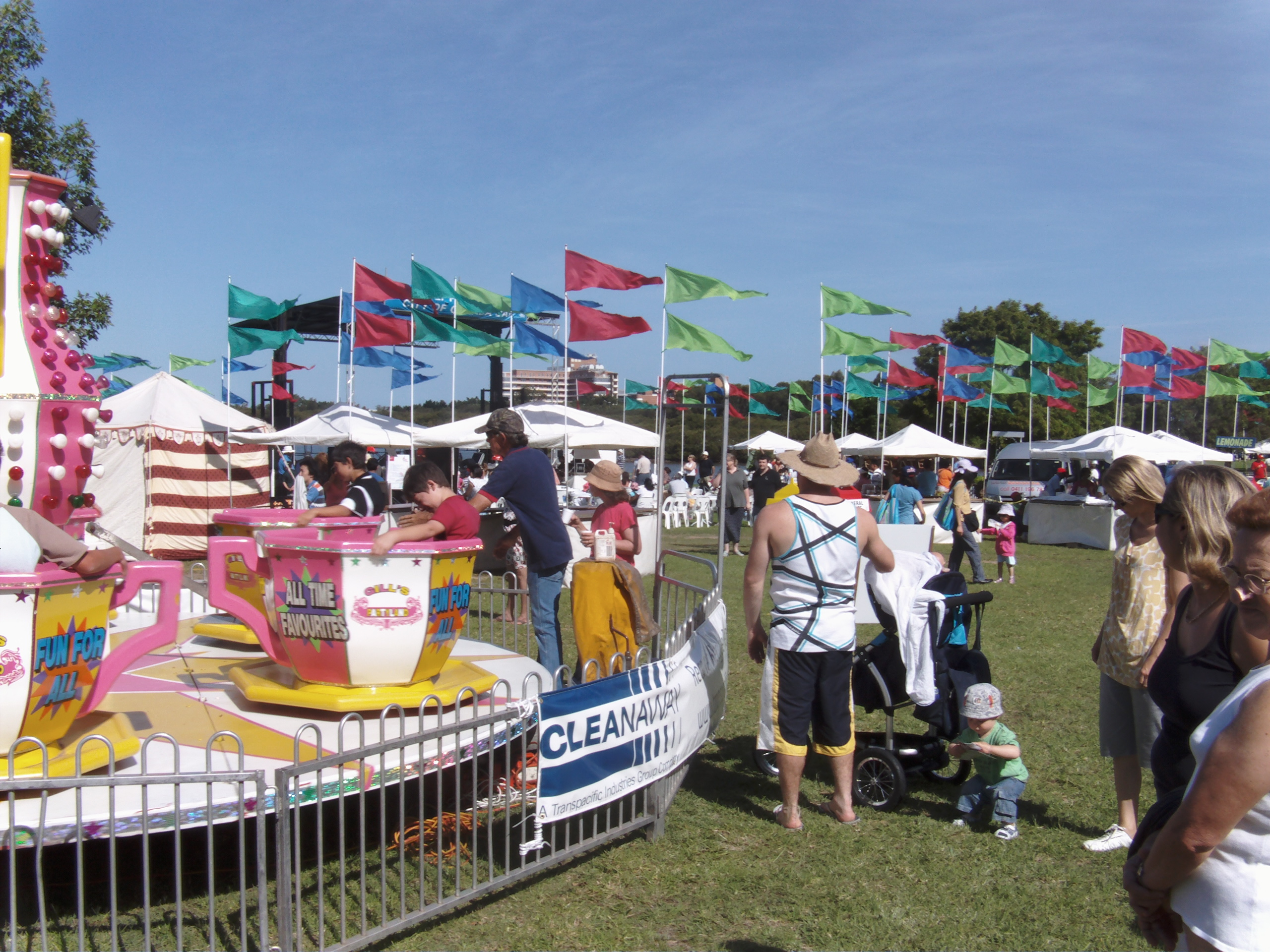
Bay Day festival at McIlwaine Park in March 2009

There are a number of foreshore parks in the eastern part of the suburb, including McIlwaine Park, King George V Park, Brays Bay Reserve (which contains the Oliveto restaurant), and Rhodes/Rotary Park. Concord and Ryde Sailing Club was based in King George V Park until construction of the second Ryde Bridge required its demolition, after which the club premises were relocated to Kissing Point in Ryde.

The Kokoda Track Memorial Walkway, which connects Brays Bay Reserve with Concord Hospital, is a memorial to those killed in Papua New Guinea on the Kokoda Track during World War II.

Rhodes features a foreshore path and cycleway, which links to an extensive network of foreshore parks in Sydney. (See Transport above)
