= Rhodes Waterside =

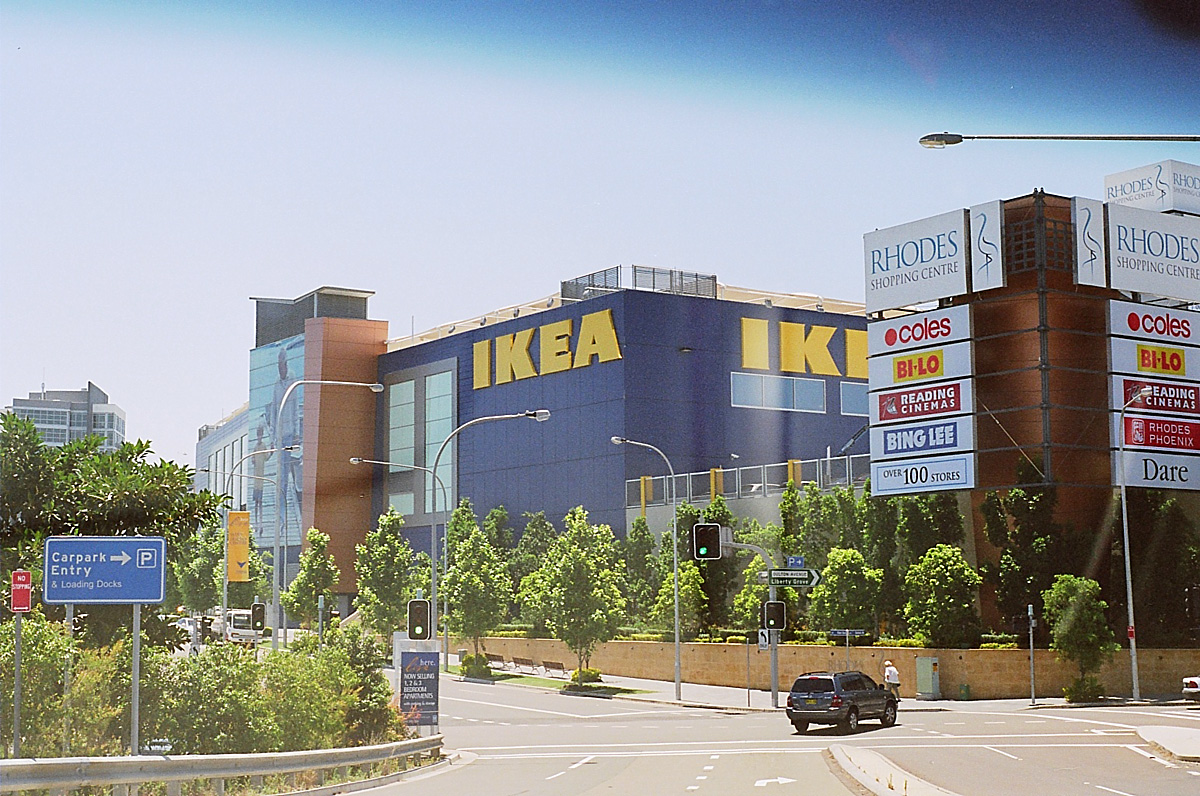
- Location: Rhodes, New South Wales, Australia
- Coordinates: 33.8353°S 151.0850°E
- Address: 1 Rider Blvd, Rhodes NSW 2138
- Opened: 2 December 2004; 21 years ago
- Manager: Mirvac
- Owner: Mirvac
- Num. of stores: 131
- Num. of anchor tenants: 5
- Floor area: 34,646 m^{2} (372,926 sq ft)
- Floors: 2
- Parking: 2,414 spaces
- Public transit: Rhodes railway station
- Website: rhodeswaterside.com.au

Rhodes Waterside (previously known as Rhodes Shopping Centre) is a shopping centre in the suburb of Rhodes in the Inner West of Sydney, Australia.

== Transport ==
The Northern Line offer frequent train services to Rhodes Station which is a short walk from the centre.

Rhodes Waterside has bus connections to Inner West, Northern Sydney and Greater Western Sydney, as well as local surrounding suburbs. The majority of its bus services are located on Rider Boulevard outside the entrance of the centre.

For many years the NSW Government has proposed adding a Rhodes ferry wharf to the Parramatta River line, but this is still in the planning stages as of August 2023.

Rhodes Waterside also has multi level car parks with 2,414 spaces.

== History ==
Rhodes Shopping Centre opened on 2 December 2004 as part of the $1.2 billion Rhodes Waterside development, which also includes medium density residential blocks and an office building as part of the shopping centre. The centre was developed by the Walker Corporation who also previously developed Broadway Shopping Centre.

Rhodes Shopping Centre was built on the former Berger Paints factory site. Berger Paints operated on the site from 1916 until 1986 and was taken over by Orica who operated on the site until 1987. The site sat vacant since and has undergone remediation.

Rhodes Shopping Centre featured IKEA, Coles, Bi-Lo and Reading Cinemas.

In December 2006 Walker Corporation put the centre up for sale which was acquired by Mirvac in January 2007, and is now owned and operated by Mirvac.

In 2007 Bi-Lo closed down and was replaced by Target.

Target left the centre in early 2021 and was replaced by Kmart which opened later that year.

== Tenants ==
Rhodes Waterside has 34,646m² of floor space. The major retailers include IKEA, Kmart, Aldi, Coles (additionally Liquorland), Bing Lee and Reading Cinemas and restaurants like Guzman y Gomez and KFC.
