= Rhodes railway station =

Railway station in Sydney, New South Wales, Australia

Rhodes
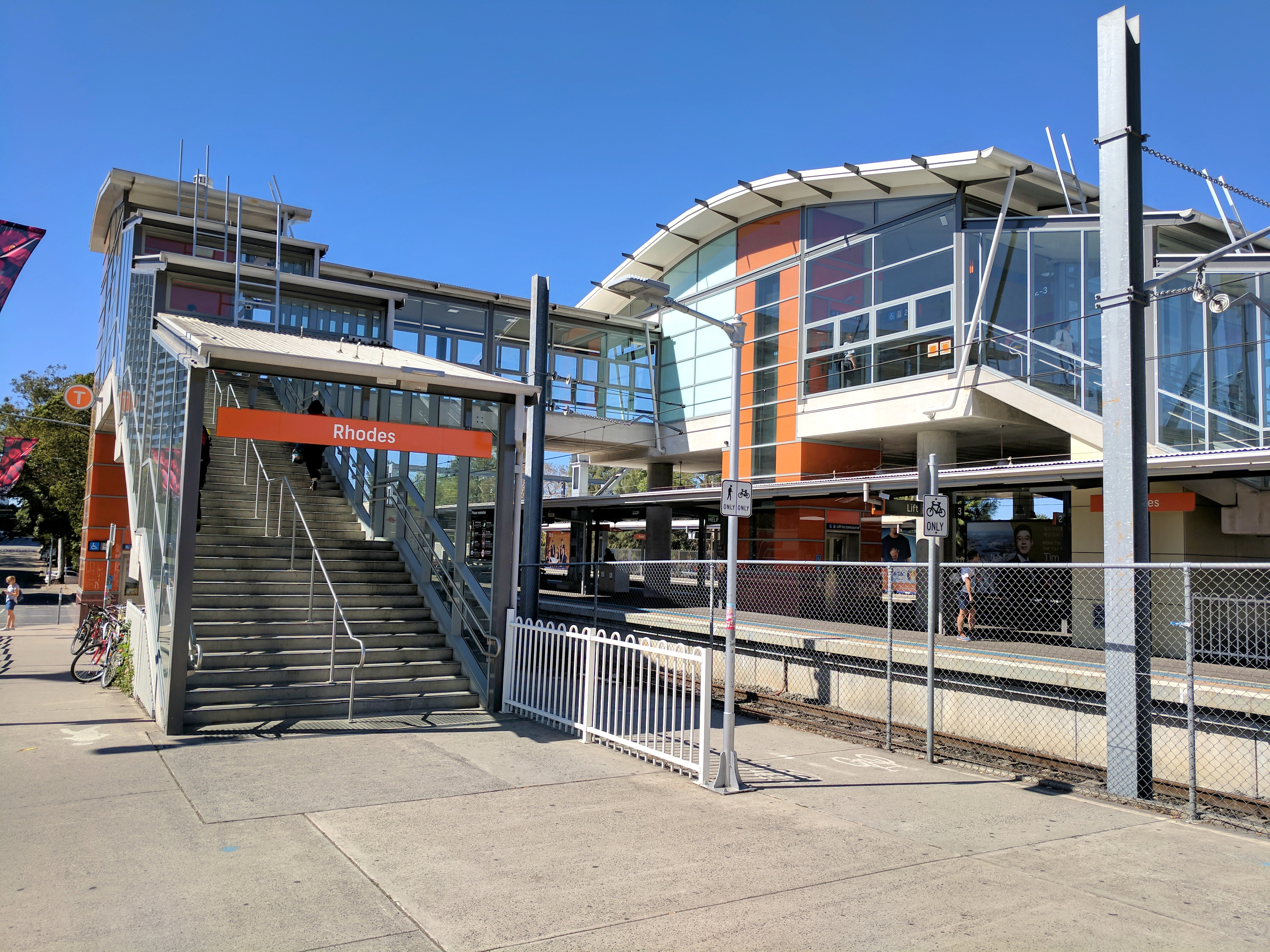
- Northbound view of station platform and concourse from the entrance in October 2017

General information
- Location: Walker Street, Rhodes; Sydney, New South Wales; Australia
- Coordinates: 33°49′50″S 151°05′13″E
- Elevation: 17 metres (56 ft)
- Owner: Transport Asset Manager of NSW
- Operator: Sydney Trains
- Line: Main North
- Distance: 16.58 km (10.30 mi) from Central
- Platforms: 3 (1 island, 1 side)
- Tracks: 3
- Connections: Bus

Construction
- Structure type: Ground
- Accessible: Yes

Other information
- Status: Staffed
- Station code: RDS
- Website: Transport for NSW

History
- Opened: 17 September 1886 (140 years ago)
- Rebuilt: 2006 (20 years ago)
- Electrified: Yes (from January 1929)

Passengers
- 2025: 5,303,556 (year); 14,530 (daily) (Sydney Trains)
- Rank: 32

Services
| Preceding station | Sydney Trains | Following station |
|---|---|---|
| Meadowbank towards Hornsby | Northern Line | Concord West towards Gordon via Central |
Location

Rhodes railway station is a heritage-listed suburban railway station located on the Main North line, serving the Sydney suburb of Rhodes. It is served by Sydney Trains T9 Northern Line services.

== History ==
The Main Northern line between Sydney and Newcastle was constructed in two distinct stages and in the earliest years, was worked as two separate railway systems.

The line between Sydney (actually the junction at Strathfield) and the Hawkesbury River was opened in April 1887, with the terminus being on the southern bank of the Hawkesbury River. The line between Newcastle and the northern bank of the Hawkesbury River (near present-day Wondabyne) was opened in January 1888.

The line was completed through between Sydney and Newcastle with the opening of the massive bridge over the Hawkesbury River in 1889.

The Strathfield to Hornsby section of the Northern line was opened for traffic on 17 September 1886. The line was constructed as a "single line" and Hornsby became the temporary terminus and remained so until the extension to Hawkesbury River was opened in 1887. At the time of the opening, stations were provided at Ryde, Dundas (later Eastwood), Field of Mars (now Epping), Beecroft, Thornleigh and Hornsby.

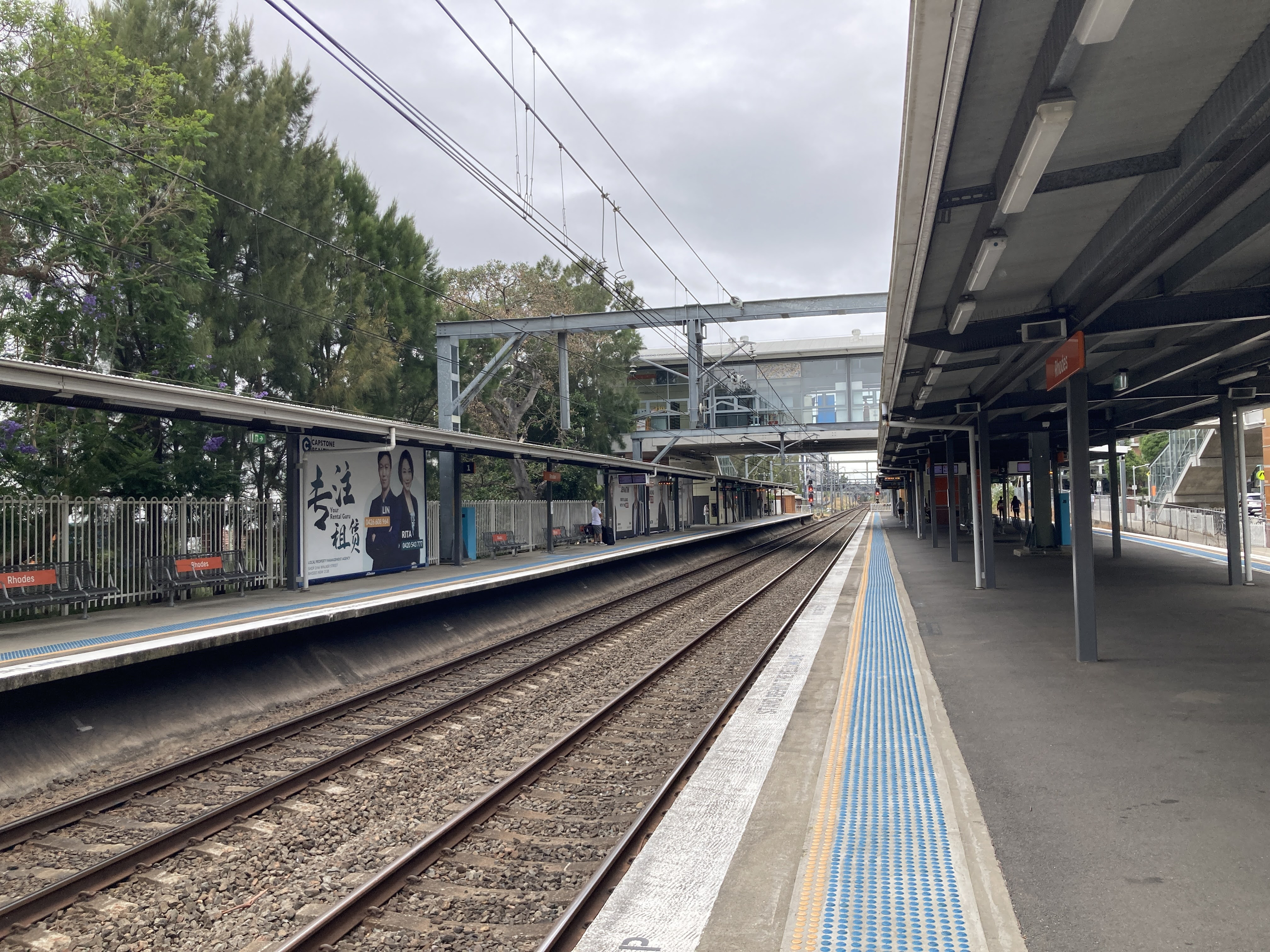
Platforms 1 and 2 of Rhodes railway station in 2022

The approved plans for the opening of the line between Strathfield and Hornsby included platforms at Rhodes (and Meadow Bank and Pennant Hills) however, no arrangements had been made to bring them into service by the day of the opening. The precise date of their completion cannot be ascertained, but they were included in the timetable dated 5 April 1887. A single brick-faced platform was provided on the Down side of the single line near the present day location at the time of opening.

The line between Strathfield and Hornsby was duplicated in March 1892. With duplication, a new Up platform was provided at Rhodes, opposite the existing Down platform.

Safeworking and interlocking came to Rhodes in October 1909 and a signal box was built on the Up platform. In 1912, the Down relief road was extended from Concord West passing behind the Down main platform, but no platform was provided for the relief line. A footbridge was added in 1915 to span all tracks and allow access to the platforms via steps.

Electrification and automatic signalling was extended to Rhodes in 1928 and a platform was added to serve the Down relief line, in effect creating an island platform for the down lines.

Rhodes developed into a predominately industrial area, being the base for railway locomotive manufacturer Tulloch. A number of mill and industrial sidings, serving various undertakings were laid near Rhodes railway station over the years.

To the north of the station, the line crosses the Parramatta River via the John Whitton Bridge. This opened in May 1980 replacing the original iron lattice bridge.

Beginning in the 1990s with the gated village/suburb of Liberty Grove (the luxury suburb opened in 1998) the area was redeveloped. It now includes residential apartments, commercial offices and the Rhodes Waterside shopping centre. In the 2000s, Rhodes station underwent a major redevelopment.

Both the Up platform and the Down island platform have been re-built using modern materials, the offices and buildings on the platforms have been replaced by a Booking Office on the overhead (new) footbridge between the platforms. Lifts have been provided between platforms and the overhead footbridge. The industrial sidings which were part of the Rhodes station arrangement were placed out of use and removed some years ago.

In June 2015, a southbound loop (track name: Up Relief) opened to the south of the station as part of the Northern Sydney Freight Corridor project.

== Services ==
=== Platforms ===
| Platform | Line | Stopping pattern | Notes |
| 1 | Northern Line (Sydney) | Southbound services to Gordon via Strathfield; 8 weekday morning peak and 8 weekday afternoon peak services to Central | |
| 2 | Northern Line (Sydney) | Northbound services to Hornsby | |
| 3 | Northern Line (Sydney) | Occasional services to Hornsby | |

The crossovers can be used to terminate northbound trains during trackwork.

=== Transport links ===
Rhodes station has various bus routes serving the station, operated by Transit Systems and Busways under contract to Transport for NSW:
Stand A, Concord Rd

- 410: to Marsfield via Top Ryde City and Lane Cove Road

Stand B, Concord Rd

- 410: to Hurstville via Concord Hospital, Burwood & Campsie

Stand C, Walker St

- 458: to Top Ryde
- 526: to Burwood via Wentworth Point, Newington, Sydney Olympic Park and Strathfield
- 533: to Chatswood Station and Olympic Park Station

Stand D, Walker St

- 458: to Burwood via Concord Hospital, Concord Road & Strathfield
- 526: to Rhodes Shopping Centre
- Free Baylink Shuttle: to Wentworth Point

== Heritage listing ==
The small, gable roofed, weatherboard, waiting shed building without an awning (type 14) on Platform 2/3, dating from 1887, is listed on the New South Wales Heritage Register. It is not in use. It is of poor integrity, as the context of the waiting shed has been compromised by loss of surrounding historic structures.

The waiting shed has significance for its rare example of a small 1880s timber waiting shed on platforms 2/3, the only remaining example in NSW. This is a rare example of a small early timber building to survive on a suburban line and is of high significance as it represents the form of many similar stations that have been removed or replaced with other buildings.

Rhodes railway station (Waiting shed) was listed on the New South Wales State Heritage Register on 2 April 1999 having satisfied the following criteria.

The place has strong or special association with a particular community or cultural group in New South Wales for social, cultural or spiritual reasons.

The place has the potential to contribute to the local community's sense of place and can provide a connection to the local community's history.

The place possesses uncommon, rare or endangered aspects of the cultural or natural history of New South Wales.

Rhodes Railway Station (Waiting shed) has significance for its rare example of a small 1880s timber waiting shed on platforms 2/3, the only remaining example in NSW.
