= Newington Armory =

Newington Armament Depot and Nature Reserve
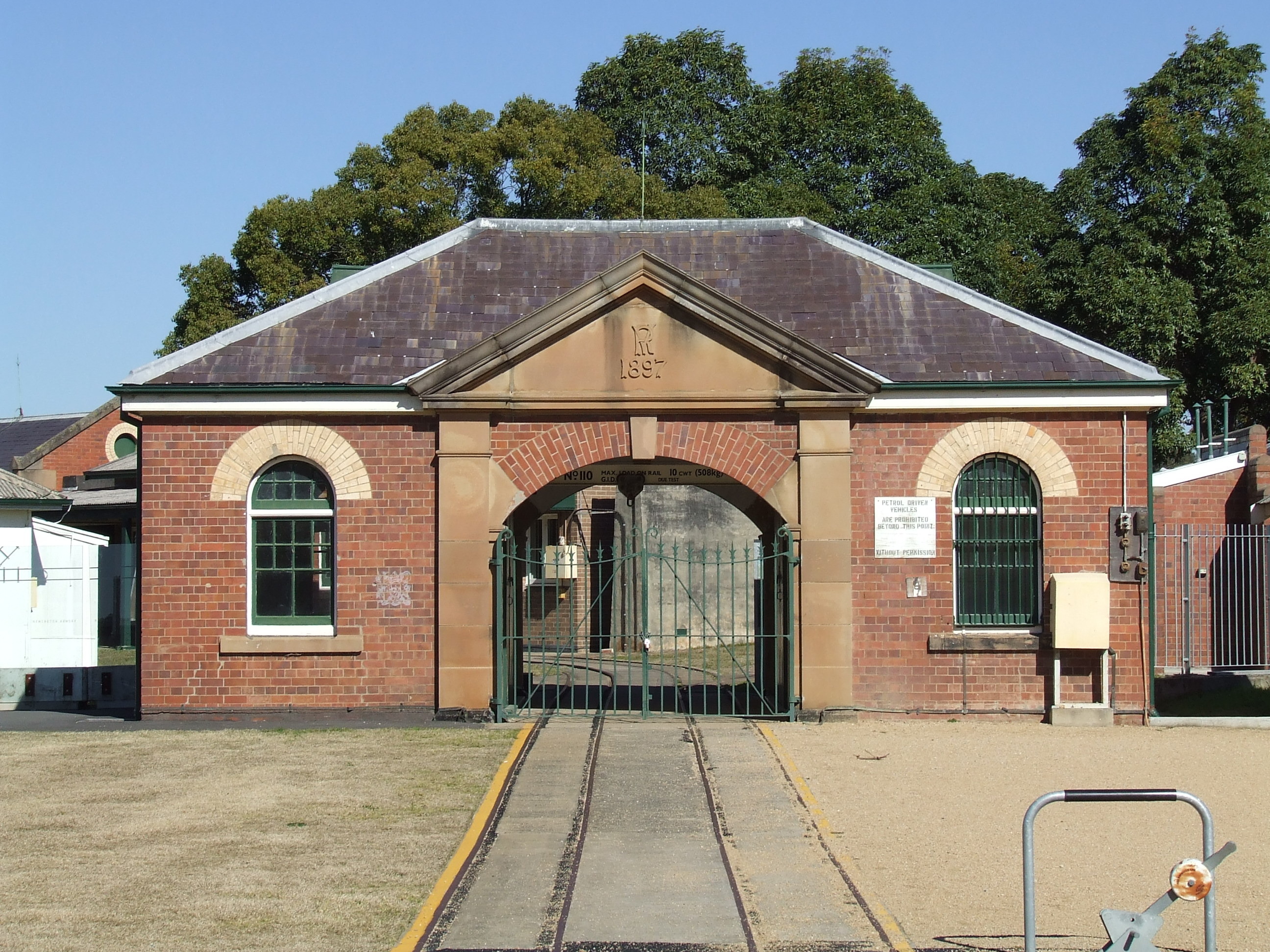
- Newington Armory gatehouse

- Location within New South Wales Location within Australia
- 33.8284°S 151.0657°E
- Location: Jamieson Street, Sydney Olympic Park, New South Wales, Australia

History
- Built: 1897–1999

Site notes
- Architect: various
- Owner: Sydney Olympic Park Authority

New South Wales Heritage Register
- Official name: Newington Armament Depot and Nature Reserve; Millennium Heritage Parklands Precinct; Newington Armory; Royal Australian Navy Armament Depot (RANAD); Newington Nature Reserve; Sydney Olympic Games
- Type: state heritage (complex / group)
- Designated: 14 January 2011
- Reference no.: 1850
- Type: Magazine
- Category: Defence
- Builders: Royal Australian Navy

Newington Armory is a heritage-listed former Royal Australian Navy armament depot, now used for tourism purposes, at Jamieson Street, Sydney Olympic Park, New South Wales, Australia. It was built from 1897 initially by the New South Wales Military Forces then by the Australian Army and later by the Royal Australian Navy. It is also known as Millennium Heritage Parklands Precinct, RAN Armament Depot Newington, Royal Australian Navy Armament Depot (RANAD), Newington Nature Reserve and Sydney Olympic Games site. The property is owned by the Sydney Olympic Park Authority. It was added to the New South Wales State Heritage Register on 14 January 2011.

== History ==
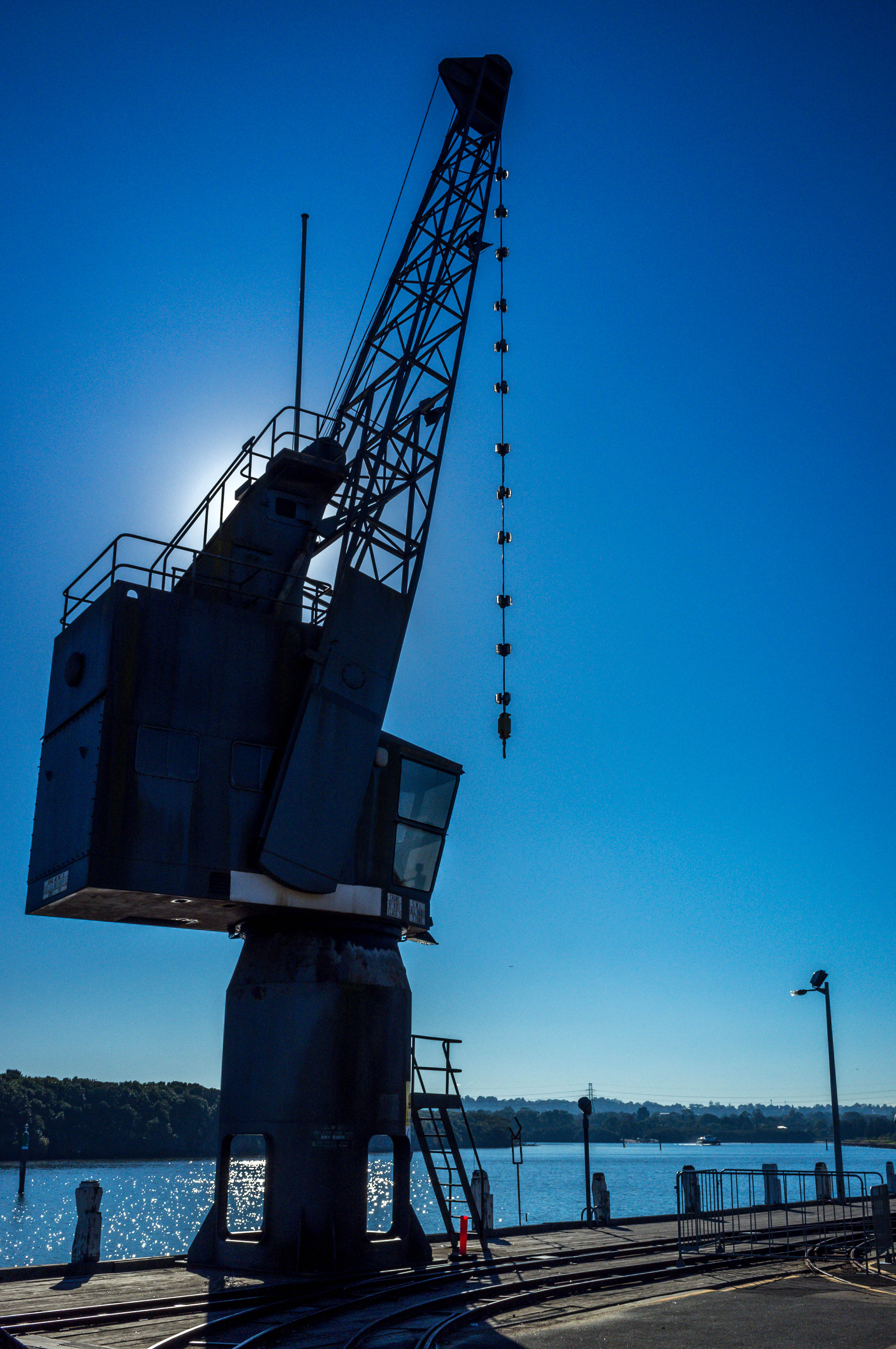
Newington Armory Wharf crane

The Parramatta river area was formed during the Holocene period approximately 6000 years ago. Aboriginal people are believed to have lived in the Sydney basin for at least 20,000 years however with the rising sea levels associated with the warming of the Holocene age archaeological evidence is limited to areas above sea level such as the Blue Mountains.

Evidence of the use of Homebush Bay by Aboriginal people has been found. Middens originally were present along the shores of the Parramatta River and Homebush Bay however these were substantially disturbed when used for lime making. Past reports have referenced the existence of physical evidence of Aboriginal occupation on the subject site as isolated artefact scatters and scarred trees. However these findings have since been questioned in further studies.

John Blaxland (1769-1845) was a landowner and merchant who came to Australia in April 1807 with the sponsorship of the British government. Blaxland's holding on the Parramatta River was 1290 acres part of which was the land later to become Newington Armament Depot. Blaxland named the site Newington after his home in Kent. He had aspirations to profit from the colony but was constantly at odds with its administration, in particular Governor Bligh, over what was owed to him and the type of agricultural and mercantile enterprise he chose to undertake.

Blaxland chose to concentrate on the cattle industry: breeding, slaughtering, salting down, and selling meat and dairy produce and did not undertake crop cultivation which was the farming activity preferred by Bligh. He produced the first suitable colonial salt on the waterfront. Blaxland's estate was rich, riverside land, comprising a rural villa estate and a farming community. The farm, factory and salt works were established between 1829 and 1832. Blaxland built a house which is on land which is now part of Silverwater Correctional Centre. After the death of Blaxland in 1845 the family mortgaged and sold the property. The land was then leased for uses such as slaughterhouses and timber cutting. The property was bought by John Weatherill who intended to subdivide it but this was never undertaken and the site reverted to the government in 1880.

Defence infrastructure in the 19th century was largely located in the inner harbour of Sydney Harbour with Powder Magazines at Goat Island and Spectacle Island. In the 1860s it became apparent that Goat Island was reaching capacity and the use of Spectacle Island as a powder magazine had begun by 1865. The Sydney Morning Herald in October 1875 reported the recommendations of a board appointed by the Government of the Colony of New South Wales into the removal of the Goat Island magazine. The second recommendation was "That a separate and distinct magazine for merchant's gunpowder, capable of storing about 300 tons, be established on the right bank of the Parramatta River...". In May 1876, the Herald reported that the Government had set aside 3,700 pounds to purchase land on the Parramatta River at Newington. By 1880 both Goat and Spectacle Islands had reached capacity and another site was required to store explosives which was far enough removed from the urban population.

It was not until 1882, after Newington College had left Newington House for Stanmore, New South Wales, that land at Newington was acquired. Newington was chosen for its relative isolation and in 1882 the Government Gazette of 22 August described the resumption of land for "erection of a magazine for the storage of gunpowder and other explosives". Most of the 248 acres resumed at this time was described as mud flats, swamp and mangroves or salt marsh. Its isolated location away from urban areas made it suitable for the storage of explosives. This area was enlarged in 1884 with an extra area of 109 hectares being made available for the magazine. Further increases were made in 1941 (38 hectares), 1946 (86 hectares), 1949 (20 hectares) and 1952 (6 hectares). The large scale reclamation eventually drained 200 acres of mud flats. By 1893 the foreshore had moved out into the bay and been straightened with two miles of fascine banks. Reclamation of the wetland continued through the 1930s and into the Second World War. Part of the site was used by the Homebush State Abattoir until 1928. In 1938 and 1941 the whole site was resumed for military purposes.

In the event, construction at the site did not commence until 1897, and it was for a military magazine rather than the magazine for merchant's gunpowder as envisaged in 1875. A notice appearing in The Sydney Morning Herald in March 1897 calling for tenders for the erection of a "Magazine, Laboratory, Gun Cotton Store and other buildings" at the "Military Reserve at Newington" is in the name of the "New South Wales Military Forces". The first buildings were constructed for and manned by the New South Wales Military Forces in 1897.

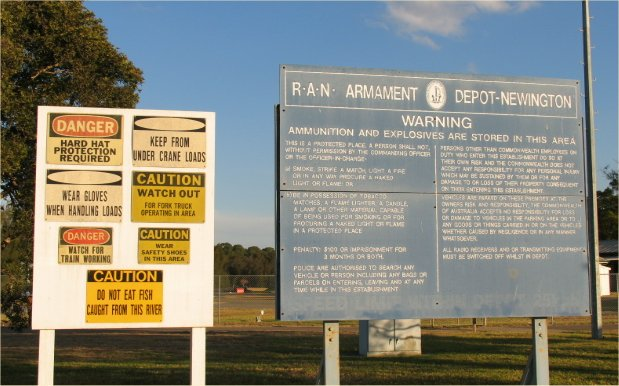
Newington Armory sign

An article in The Cumberland Argus and Fruitgrowers' Advocate in September 1897, reporting on the ongoing construction of the Magazine, says that: "...the Government Powder Magazine at Newington... is intended to store all the powder required for military purposes in the colony..." .

In June 1895 The Sydney Morning Herald, quoting the Government Gazette of 18 June 1895 recorded the formation of:

"Ordnance Store Corps: "C" (Ordnance) Branch of the Military Secretary's Department, now a civil branch, to be converted into an Ordnance Store Corps."

According to one account:

"The Corps comprised No 1 Gun Wharf Section with a Deputy Assistant Commissary General of Ordnance, a Lieutenant and Quartermaster, three Conductors of Stores and one Sergeant Artificer. No 2 Magazine Section was composed of one Conductor of Stores and three Privates; and No 3 Armourer's Section was composed of a Lieutenant and Quartermaster, with one Armourer Sergeant and two Privates. These appointments were filled by members of the permanent military forces."

It is the Ordnance Store Corps, and specifically the No. 2 Magazine Section, that is likely to have been the unit that commissioned the Newington Magazine in 1898.

The New South Wales Military Forces were, at Federation in 1901, subsumed into the new Commonwealth of Australia military forces (later Australian Army). In 1902, the military staff of the Magazine, a Sergeant and three Gunners, were transferred to the new Commonwealth Ordnance Stores Corps.

The site during the period occupied by the New South Wales Military Forces was focussed on the Parramatta River side within a precinct comprising the river frontage, armament buildings and accommodation buildings on a hill away from the handling and storage of explosives.

The Military Magazine, as it was known at the time, remained in support of the Army until 1921, when it was transferred to the Department of Navy, to supplement the explosives storage available at the RAN Ordnance Depot at Spectacle Island. During the 1920s and 1930s the depot was gradually expanded to enable mass-detonating explosives, and later all explosives, to be removed from Spectacle Island. During this period it operated as a sub-depot of Spectacle Island. The navy used the site to store enough ammunition for 2 ships and 2 years practice ammunition. The Navy lobbied for the resumption of more land arguing the site was too small to be of any real value. There followed a decade of development on the subject site and land resumed from the State Abattoir.

The Second World War had a major impact upon defence in Australia and the way it was managed. The Royal Australian Navy was formed in 1911 but still played a role as a colonial arm of the British navy. In 1938 in response to the European military situation the Navy's expansion on the site dramatically increased. The armament depot was fully operational and at its peak when the Second World War was declared. In the Second World War the RAN took on a major role in defence as thousands of Allied ships arrived in Sydney, affecting docking facilities and particularly armament supply and storage. Newington Armament Depot was part of a network of Navy sites on Sydney harbour.

During World War II, the depot expanded greatly by acquisition of private property (including the Carnarvon Golf Course) and the New South Wales State Brickyards under emergency powers. During the early part of the Pacific War, an independent US Navy ammunition depot was built within the depot, and during the later part, additional storehouses were built by the Australian Government as part of its contribution to the support of the British Pacific Fleet. Munitions were transported between Garden Island, Cockatoo Island, Spectacle Island, and Newington. All ships entering the harbour were de-ammunitioned and the ammunition was then taken to Newington for storage. Of the 5,127 dockings by Navy ships between 1939 and 1945, there were over 500 US ships and almost 400 British ones. There were smaller numbers of Dutch and French ships as well, as almost 12,000 Merchant ships which also carried armaments and naval supplies. During the Second World War Newington played an essential role in supplying Allied ships for the war in the Pacific.

At the end of the war, the Navy continued to operate the site, and it remained an intrinsic part of the Sydney Ammunition Pipeline. The Brickyards were returned to the New South Wales Government, but most of the private property was compulsorily acquired. The pipeline is the movement of ammunition from storage facilities, such as the RAN Armament Depot at Kingswood via road to Newington, where it was transported by water to Garden Island.

During the mid-1950s the Commonwealth and New South Wales governments agreed that storage of mass-detonating explosives should be transferred to the sub-depot at Kingswood (later RAN Armament Depot, Kingswood) and this occurred progressively from about 1957. RAN Armament Depot Newington continued to store other categories of explosives, and remained the focal point for transshipment of ammunition between road and water, through the Newington Wharf.

During this time, several animals were present at the Armory including a flock of sheep to graze on the plentiful grass, and horses that pulled the carriages filled with armaments.

During the mid-1970s the closure of the depot was first raised in connection with a proposal to hold the World Student Games in Sydney. During the 1980s, regular mowing of the forest understorey to reduce the fire risk ceased, allowing natural regeneration to commerce. In 1987, operational difficulties resulting from the adoption of new NATO Safety Principles for the Storage of Explosives focused navy and government attention on relocation of the depot to a new site outside Sydney. In March 1994 it was announced that the depot would close to allow the 2000 Olympic Games to be held at the adjacent Homebush Bay.

The RAN started to vacate the site in 1996, with ownership transferred to the Government of New South Wales to be developed as the Sydney 2000 Olympics Athlete's Village and the suburb of Newington. Remediation and redevelopment of the southern two thirds of the depot commenced in that year. The restoration of tidal flushing to the wetland occurred in 1997 (channel 1) and channels 2 and 3 (1999), as the wetland had become effectively landlocked as a result of the construction of the Parramatta River seawall in the 1890s and reclamation of Wentworth (Homebush) Bay in the 1950s.

The Navy was still using the site for the transfer of armaments up to December 1999 (for use in East Timor). The RAN finally vacated the depot in December 1999 with the last ammunition operation conducted over the wharf on 14 December 1999. The site was handed to the NSW State Government in January 2000. By then the southern half of the depot was being transformed into the Olympic Games athlete's village, and subsequently the suburb of Newington. The remainder, largely intact and incorporating most of the 1897 structures, has been incorporated into the Sydney Olympic Park. It is now known as the Newington Armory.

On 14 September 2000, 34.7 hectares of estuarine wetland and 13 hectares of remnant forest were gazetted as the Silverwater Nature Reserve, later renamed Newington Nature Reserve.

Extensive stabilisation and restoration works were conducted to the buildings, railway track and locomotives in 2001.

The first public open day was held in 2003. Since then, the site has undergone progressive adaptive reuse. The rail track was extended to form a loop encircling the forest, enabling the train to operate as a visitor tour and interpretive attraction.

In 2007, Blaxland Riverside Park opened by the riverside, covering 20 hectares adjoining the Newington Armament Depot. Stage 1 of $7m works opened, comprising creation of landscaped picnic terraces, development of a riverfront promenade, cafe and parking areas. In the same year, the wharf was redeveloped and opened as part of the new park.

The cafe building was destroyed by fire and rebuilt in 2008.

== Description ==
The Newington Armament Depot and Nature Reserve is part of the former Royal Australian Navy Armament Depot, Newington, which operated at the site until December 1999. Armaments used by Australian, British and United States Navy ships were received, inspected, tested, stored and distributed at the Depot. These armaments included gunpowder, explosive shells, cordite, fuses, depth charges, torpedoes and rockets.

The site now spans approximately 100 hectares. It contains 100 buildings, 6.7 kilometres of narrow-gauge rail, 7 battery-powered locomotives, 30 rail wagons, three cranes, various items of moveable heritage left behind after the Depot closed, items of moveable heritage on loan from the Department of Defence, and the 48-hectares Newington Nature Reserve. At its peak the Depot spanned from the Parramatta River to Parramatta Road (259 hectares) and contained 191 buildings. The southern part of the Depot was developed as the athletes village for the 2000 Summer Olympics and is now the suburb of Newington. The site includes a wide variety of buildings, blast containment structures, transport networks, landforms and moveable items associated with the storage and handling of explosives, all of which were closely associated with the topography and other natural features of the site.

Evidence of Indigenous occupation in the form of isolated artefact scatters has been referred to in early documentation of this site however more recent information has placed this in question. Scarred trees have been recorded however later reports have also questioned the veracity of the cultural significance of these trees. (Irish) The most dominant physical evidence of cultural significance to be found on the site is the built environment relating to the use by the Army, the Royal Australian Navy (RAN) and the American Navy.

The site has been described as consisting of four zones by the Brooks Conservation Master Plan 2003 according to the periods in which they were occupied.

1) The "Original Establishment Precinct" is in the north west corner of the site facing Parramatta River and contains the earliest military buildings and evidence of its occupation as an Armament Depot from 1897. It contains the wharf with two cranes, reclaimed land and part of the light rail system as well as Federation face brick buildings which were purpose built to store and distribute armaments. These buildings are protected by earth mounding and concrete separation blast walls to shield explosive materials in event of accidents. At the top of the precinct on a hill at the end of a cobble stone driveway flanked by two rows of trees ending in two sandstone gate posts are administration and residential buildings. These buildings are a mixture of Federation brick buildings constructed in the first phase and other buildings built during the 1920s, 1930s and 1940s. The later buildings are a mix of materials including timber and fibro with asbestos roofing. The cranes are dated as c. 1973.

2) The "Early Navy Occupancy Precinct" is in the north east corner of the site and provides physical evidence of the Navy occupancy and expansion up until the Second World War. The precinct has a concentration of armaments storage and weapons testing buildings due to its isolation from the other precincts by the wetlands. As the precinct was originally used for burning carbine and testing armament the conservation of the wetland is complicated by the presence of unexploded ordnance.

3) The "RAN Wartime Expansion Precinct" is in the south eastern corner of the site and it includes half of the Woodland. Within this precinct are buildings constructed in the period leading up to WWII for use as armaments storage and weapons testing as well as administration. In addition there are transportation infrastructure and landscape works from this period.

4) The south west corner of the site is described as the "US Navy Utilisation Precinct" because it contains explosives storage bunkers constructed for the US Navy. The area also contains Inter-war buildings constructed as offices and workshops which are generally located in a group close to Jamieson Street at the northern end of the precinct on the hill where the 19th century residences are located. The typical armament store building of the former RANAD site is electrically earthed with massive copper straps, constructed of materials with good antistatic properties; provided with facilities for discharging static electricity from people entering the store; fitted with lightning conductors; and contained within a high earth embankment, which will direct any accidental blast upwards.

On site is also a movable heritage collection (part of the Navy Heritage Collection) which is unique and historically related to the Newington site. No other location in the world holds a complete collection of ordnance that directly relates to the entire history of the site and that site only. Many of the individual items are also either extremely rare or the only known example to exist. This collection is not part of this heritage listing on the State Heritage Register but is protected by the Commonwealth.

=== Newington Nature Reserve ===
The site encompasses Newington Nature Reserve which is reserved under the NSW National Parks and Wildlife Act 1974 because of its significant ecological values. The Reserve comprises 48 hectares of remnant and regenerating forest and estuarine wetland communities. These ecological communities extend beyond the Reserve into adjoining land.

The Reserve supports 20 hectares of "Sydney Turpentine Ironbark Forest", classified as a critically endangered ecological community under the Commonwealth Environment Protection and Biodiversity Act 1999, and as endangered under the NSW Threatened Species Conservation Act 1995. Only 0.5% of the original pre-European extent of this forest type remains intact, and only 220 hectares of this is protected within conservation reserves. 28 native plants, identified as being of regional conservation significance, have been recorded within the forest. It has a high density of hollow-bearing trees (uncommon in other similar remnants of this community), which provide nesting sites for birds and potential microbat roosts. It is an important local and regional stronghold for bush bird and bat species, and provides a base for species that rely on the forest for shelter and breeding habitat, but utilise parkland and urban habitats for feeding and movement.

The Reserve supports a 35-hectare estuarine wetland, which contains mangrove forest, mudflats, "Swamp Oak Floodplain Forest" and "Coastal Saltmarsh". Mangroves are classified as 'protected marine vegetation under the NSW Fisheries Management Act 1994; Swamp Oak Floodplain forest and Coastal saltmarsh are each classified as an 'endangered ecological community under the NSW Threatened Species Conservation Act 1995. Wilsonia backhousei, listed as "vulnerable" under the TSCA, is a component of the saltmarsh community. The saltmarsh community also supports two species of restricted distribution and local conservation significance - Halosarcia pergranulata and Lampranthus tegens.

The reserve contains a complete zonal succession of eucalypt forest, casuarina forest, saltmarsh and mangroves; the only such succession remaining on the Parramatta river estuary.

It supports the only known maternity roost of the White-striped Freetail bat (Tadarida australis) in the Sydney area, and in a building. This maternity roost is established in the roof and wall cavity of a former explosives storehouse. Several other former explosive storehouses within the precinct also show evidence of recent use as maternity roosts by several bat species.

It supports a population of the Green and Golden Bell Frog, listed as an endangered species under the NSW TSCA, and as a vulnerable species under the Commonwealth EPBC.

It supports 144 species of birds, including migratory species listed under international agreements between the governments of Australia, China, Japan and Korea.

The Reserve takes up land a length of approximately one kilometre along Parramatta River without actually including the edge of the river frontage; the estuarine wetlands form part of a network of estuarine habitats along the Parramatta River utilised by migratory shorebirds.

The Reserve supports one of two remaining Sydney populations of the White-fronted Chat (Epthianura albifrons). This species is listed as "vulnerable" under the Threatened Species conservation Act 1995, and the Sydney Olympic Park population as a whole is listed as an "endangered population".

=== Railway ===
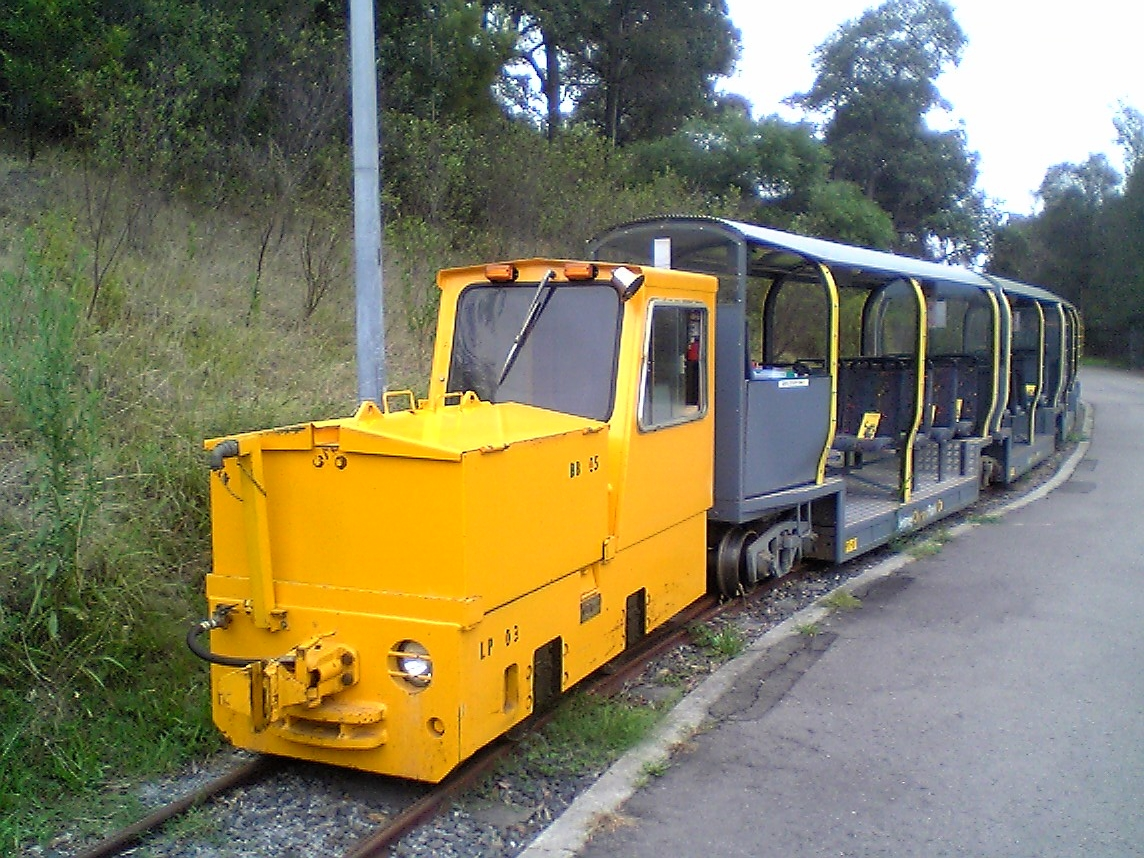
Battery Electric Locomotive for moving armaments

The site has a 2 ft (610 mm) narrow gauge electric railway with 60v battery locomotives which were used for transporting munitions and now visitors around the armory. The train is currently not in operation (as of 2020) but is expected to return. The circuit runs through some restricted areas and partly goes outside the boundary of the Newington Armory into a publicly accessible area where the tracks cross over the Louise Sauvage Pathway twice.

=== Wharf ===
The wharf on the Parramatta River which was used to ship ammunition in and out of the Armory while it was operating, was used as a temporary wharf by Sydney Ferries' Parramatta River services for four months from 14 January 2015 while the Sydney Olympic Park ferry wharf was rebuilt. The timber in the wharf was repaired during 2022.

=== Scout Museum ===
The Australian Scout Museum was once located inside the Armory. The museum was closed in 2022.

=== Condition ===
Since the closure of the armament depot in the 1990s the original seven precincts described in the 1989 Godden Report have been reduced substantially. The southern precinct and half the magazine precinct have since been redeveloped as the suburb Newington. The remaining Newington Armament Depot precinct is in good condition and is maintained regularly with many of the habitable original buildings still occupied. The buildings used for armament storage are not habitable and are currently empty or are used for short term storage.

Today the site is being opened up for managed public multi use for recreational, cultural, arts, scientific, research and educational activities, short term accommodation, events and programs as well as conservation and nature reserve. An adaptive building reuse program has included new uses such as a cafe and kiosk on the foreshore, visitor information and bike hire, artists studios, art gallery, theatrette, 96 bed lodge accommodation facility, Birds Australia Discovery Centre, museum and operational storage facilities. The railway has been restored and is operated as a guided tour for visitors. Substantial stabilisation and restoration works were undertaken to buildings, railway track and locomotives in 2001 with the result that built assets are generally in good condition.

Forest and wetland communities are generally in good condition due to implementation of a long-term bush regeneration and enhancement program. Access to these areas is highly restricted to ensure their ongoing protection. A program of natural regeneration and planting of local provenance plants is extending and enhancing these communities.

Wetland hydrology is actively managed to balance habitat needs of saltmarsh and migratory shorebirds and to minimise creation of mosquito breeding habitat. Mangrove seedlings are actively removed where they pose a threat to saltmarsh or mudflat communities. The wetland contains areas identified as potentially containing unexploded ordnance, which restricts access and some types of management activities. Parts of the wetland contains extensive breeding habitat for the pest mosquito Aedes vigilax, necessitating periodic treatment with a bacterial larvicide.

The precinct has been reduced from its original size at the height of its operations. However the remaining precinct has a high degree of integrity.

== Heritage listing ==
The former Royal Australian Navy (RAN) Armament Depot - Newington known as Newington Armament Depot and including the area now known as the Newington Nature Reserve, is potentially of State heritage significance as a place which demonstrates the historical and technical development of systems and regulations of explosives handling and storage from the 1890s to 1999 and also demonstrates the importance of Sydney as a Navy Port. Newington Armament Depot and Nature Reserve is historically significant as it contains physical evidence demonstrating the history of European occupation through to the end of the 20th century. The site is a valuable tool for research relating to the early settlement and development of the colony of NSW and the development of defence from colonial times.

Newington Armament Depot and Nature Reserve is potentially of State significance as an extensive cultural landscape containing features from all periods of its human occupation as well as regionally rare forest and wetlands. Newington Nature Reserve is reserved under the NSW National Parks and Wildlife Act 1974 because of its significant ecological values; these extend beyond the boundaries of the Reserve into other parts of the site. The site 's estuarine wetland and forest communities are rare remnants of ecological communities that once dominated this region. These provide a valuable resource for research and include a number of rare and endangered ecological communities, flora and fauna including Sydney Turpentine Ironbark Forest, Coastal Saltmarsh, the Green and Golden Bell Frog, Wilsonia backhousei and the White Fronted Chat. The site supports 144 bird species and ten bat species including the only known maternity roost of the White-striped Freetail bat in the Sydney area. In addition, it supports the only remaining example of a complete zonal succession from eucalypt forest, saltmarsh, mangroves and tidal mudflats on the Parramatta River estuary.

Newington Armament Depot and Nature Reserve was listed on the New South Wales State Heritage Register on 14 January 2011 having satisfied the following criteria.

The place is important in demonstrating the course, or pattern, of cultural or natural history in New South Wales.

Newington Armament Depot and Nature Reserve is historically significant for its preservation of evidence of European occupation along the Parramatta River. It demonstrates the early occupation of lands at Homebush by Europeans, only nine years after the area was first sighted by members of the first fleet, who remarked upon the presence of Aboriginal people in the area. It was the site of an early land grant to pastoral and industrial entrepreneur John Blaxland (1769-1845) whose family were influential in the colony, and whose house is located on adjacent land. The site demonstrates the importance of Parramatta River in the opening up of the colony and the early rural settlement of areas close to Parramatta. Its historical importance as an Armament Depot lies in its demonstration of the evolution of systems and regulations of explosives handling and storage over 90 years and the role of Sydney as a major port for the Australian Navy fleet. It is highly illustrative of the extent of involvement of the Royal Australian Navy and US Navy in the Second World War and the logistics provided by Australia to the Allies. (Brooks)

The place has a strong or special association with a person, or group of persons, of importance of cultural or natural history of New South Wales's history.

The site of the Newington Armaments Depot has historical association with John Blaxland (1769-1845) who arrived as a free settler in 1806. Blaxland was the first European to substantially develop the land at Newington. He made a contribution to the economic development of the colony, held the office of magistrate and became well known for his disagreements with the early Governors, in particular Governor Bligh. The place is associated with the Royal Australian Navy who occupied the site from 1921 until 1997. It is also associated with the Royal Navy (British) and the US Navy.

The place is important in demonstrating aesthetic characteristics and/or a high degree of creative or technical achievement in New South Wales.

Newington Armament Depot's unusual mixture of historic buildings, some of which are partially submerged within earth mounds, with its open parkland setting bordered by the forest and wetland together with its relationship to the Parramatta River make a remarkable landscape. The complex features an outstanding collection of turn of the century brick structures which display the application of Federation design to purpose built industrial buildings. (Godden)

The place has a strong or special association with a particular community or cultural group in New South Wales for social, cultural or spiritual reasons.

Newington Armaments Depot is of social value to the former Navy employees and their families who lived and worked on site up until the 1990s.

The place has potential to yield information that will contribute to an understanding of the cultural or natural history of New South Wales.

Newington Armaments Depot has high potential for interpretation and research into technological developments in explosives handling and storage. It illustrates the development of blast containment structures and design philosophies to accommodate changing international explosives regulations. The buildings constructed for the US Navy during the Second World war are significant examples of military storehouse technology. Specific building types demonstrate the adaptation of building technology for armaments handling and storage and the specific nature of armaments work practices. Research conducted within the endangered estuarine wetland and forest communities is used to inform an adaptive management regime, thereby assisting conservation of these communities. This research has wider application to management of other lands that support similar ecological systems and species.

The place possesses uncommon, rare or endangered aspects of the cultural or natural history of New South Wales.

The Royal Australian Navy Armament Depot at Newington was unique in the history of NSW for its role as the major storage and supply depot of explosive navy armament to service the fleet facilities in Sydney Harbour from 1895 to 1998. It was the only place in NSW where there was a combination of operational activities and physical facilities for the Australian, the US and the Royal Navies on the one site. Three "endangered ecological communities", listed under the Threatened Species Conservation Act 1995 (Coastal Saltmarsh; Swamp Oak Floodplain Forest; Sydney Turpentine Ironbark Forest) are found on the site. The Turpentine Ironbark Forest is also listed as critically endangered in the Environment Protection Biodiversity Conservation Act 1999. the nature reserve is the only remaining example on the Parramatta river of a complete estuarine zonation, from tidal mudflats, to mangroves, saltmarsh, swamp oak flood plain forest and eucalypt forest. Almost all similar sequences have been cleared in the Sydney Basin. The site is home to part of a listed "endangered population" of the White-fronted Chat and to the saltmarsh plant Wilsonia backhousei, both of which are listed as "vulnerable species" under the Threatened Species Conservation Act 1995. A Green and Golden bell frog population is found on site which is "endangered" under the Threatened Species Conservation Act 1995 and vulnerable under the Environment Protection Biodiversity Conservation Act 1999. The site is the only known maternity roost of the White striped Freetail Bat in the Sydney area and is also the only known maternity roost of this species in a building. The site is home to 144 species of birds, including migratory shorebirds and 10 species of bats.

The place is important in demonstrating the principal characteristics of a class of cultural or natural places/environments in New South Wales.

The forest and wetland demonstrate the characteristics of their respective classes of ecological community. Newington Armaments Depot is an excellent example of an armament depot that has evolved over the course of the 20th century. The integrity of the precinct is significant as it is able to demonstrate all periods of the life of the facility.
