= Louise Sauvage Pathway =

Pathway in Newington, Sydney, Australia

Coordinates: 33.8331°S 151.0655°E

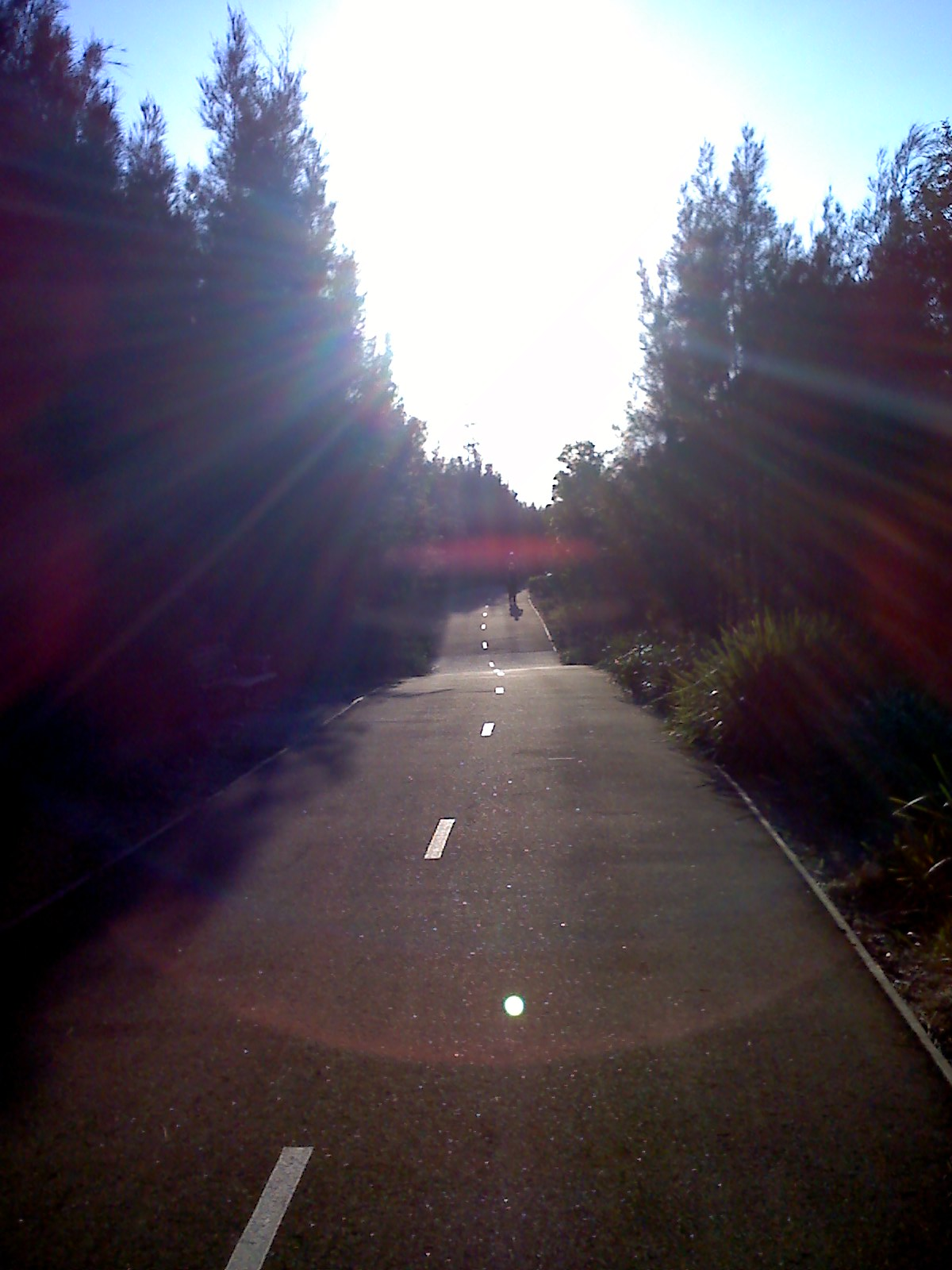
- Looking north towards ferry terminal

Technical
- Line length: 6.3 km (3.9 mi)

Louise Sauvage Pathway runs alongside the suburb of Newington, New South Wales, and is named in honour of Australian paralympic wheelchair racer Louise Sauvage. The Pathway is the longest continuous section of pathway in Sydney Olympic Park. The pathway is suitable for walking and pushbikes, as well as wheelchairs.

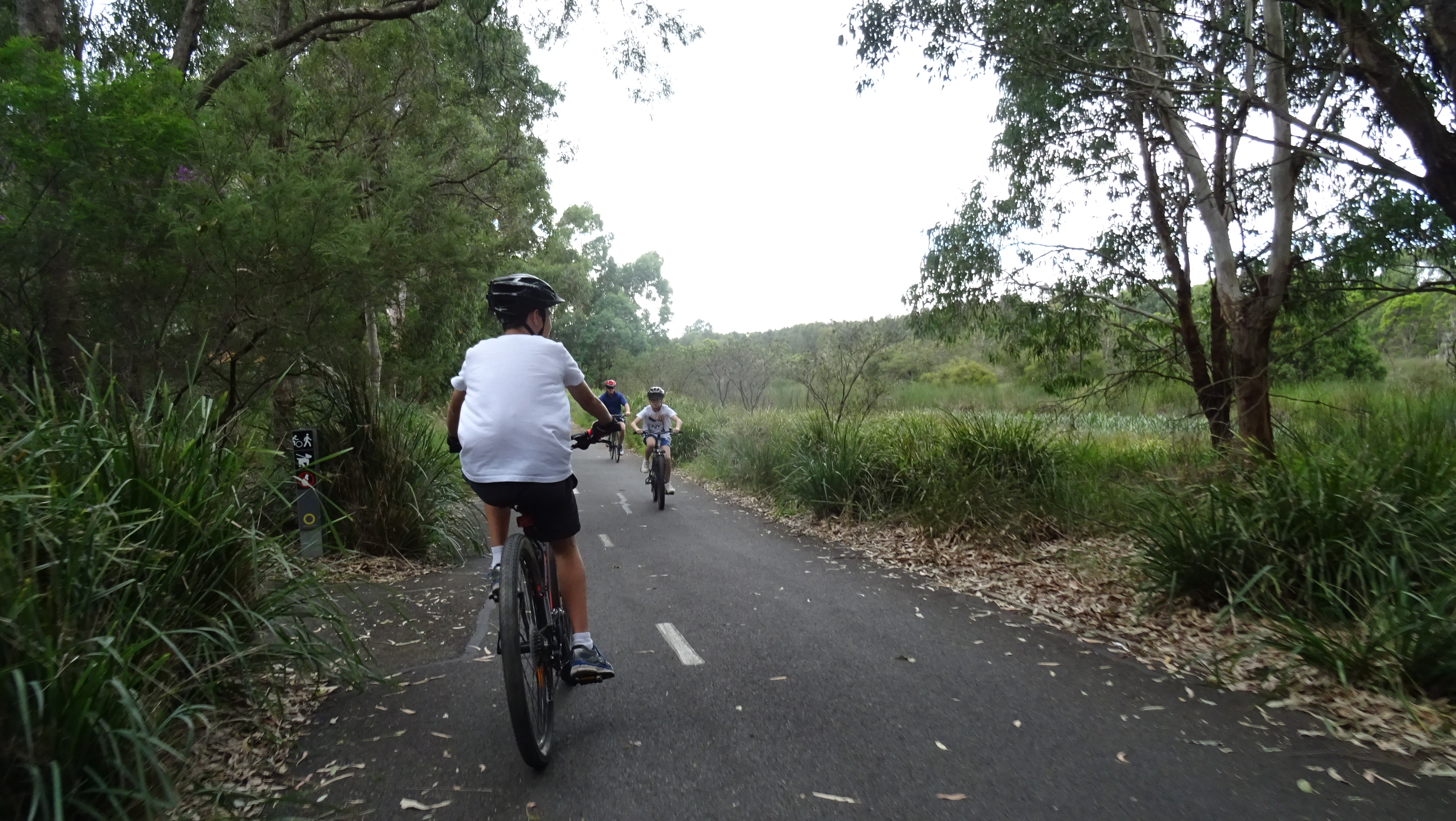
Louise Sauvage Pathway near Haslams Creek

== Facilities ==
The Pathway is two-lane, marked and sealed throughout, with numerous detours along its length, ranging from two-lane and marked, to one-lane sealed and an assortment of recognised and unrecognised unsealed paths. The pathway is only interrupted in two locations where the access roads cross into Newington, the former athletes' village. Amenities for travellers are provided along the path, including five water fountains and a toilet facility.

== Historical links ==
The Pathway provides a north-south link between the Parramatta River and the Western Motorway, passing the last remaining piece of virgin woodland in Sydney's Cumberland basin. The Pathway also provides access to Newington Armory as well as passing by some adjoining land, closed to all public access due to unexploded ordnance buried in the swamp.

Two of the former buildings of the Newington Arms Depot are accessed by the Pathway and no longer within the grounds of the Armory: Building 46, a renovated educational building operated by Ausgrid, and a former US Navy trench-style artillery bunker behind Newington Precinct 3. These bunkers were serviced by narrow-gauge railway to carry the highly sensitive explosive shells; the rail tracks are still maintained, and many are openly accessible via the Pathway.

== Environmental links ==
Numerous waterways and wetlands adjoin the Pathway and its linking paths. Some of the water bodies such as Haslams Creek link to the Parramatta River, whereas others such as the Narawang Wetlands are artificial lakes created as part of the Sydney Olympic Park environmental rejuvenation. The Bell Frog Boardwalk side-track provides access to some rare habitat of the Green and Golden Bell Frog.

The Newington Nature Reserve contains a Turpentine Ironbark Margin Forest that survives intact in the same condition as it was before Sydney was colonised.

== Recreation and Events ==
Each year in September the pathway is closed for one day to make way for long-distance bicyclists travelling through Olympic Park. The pathway forms an integral part of the route for sporting events such as the Sydney Spring Cycle (Classic Route).

For cross-city riding, many preferred routes will use the combination of Silverwater Road Bridge, River Walk and Louise Sauvage Pathway. Such routes include any travel from the Hills District to the southern suburbs around Liverpool, and from Parramatta to the inner-western suburbs or Sydney Airport via the Cooks River cycleway.

== See also ==
- Sydney Olympic Park
- Newington Armory
- Newington, New South Wales
