= Newington, New South Wales =

Newington
- Suburb
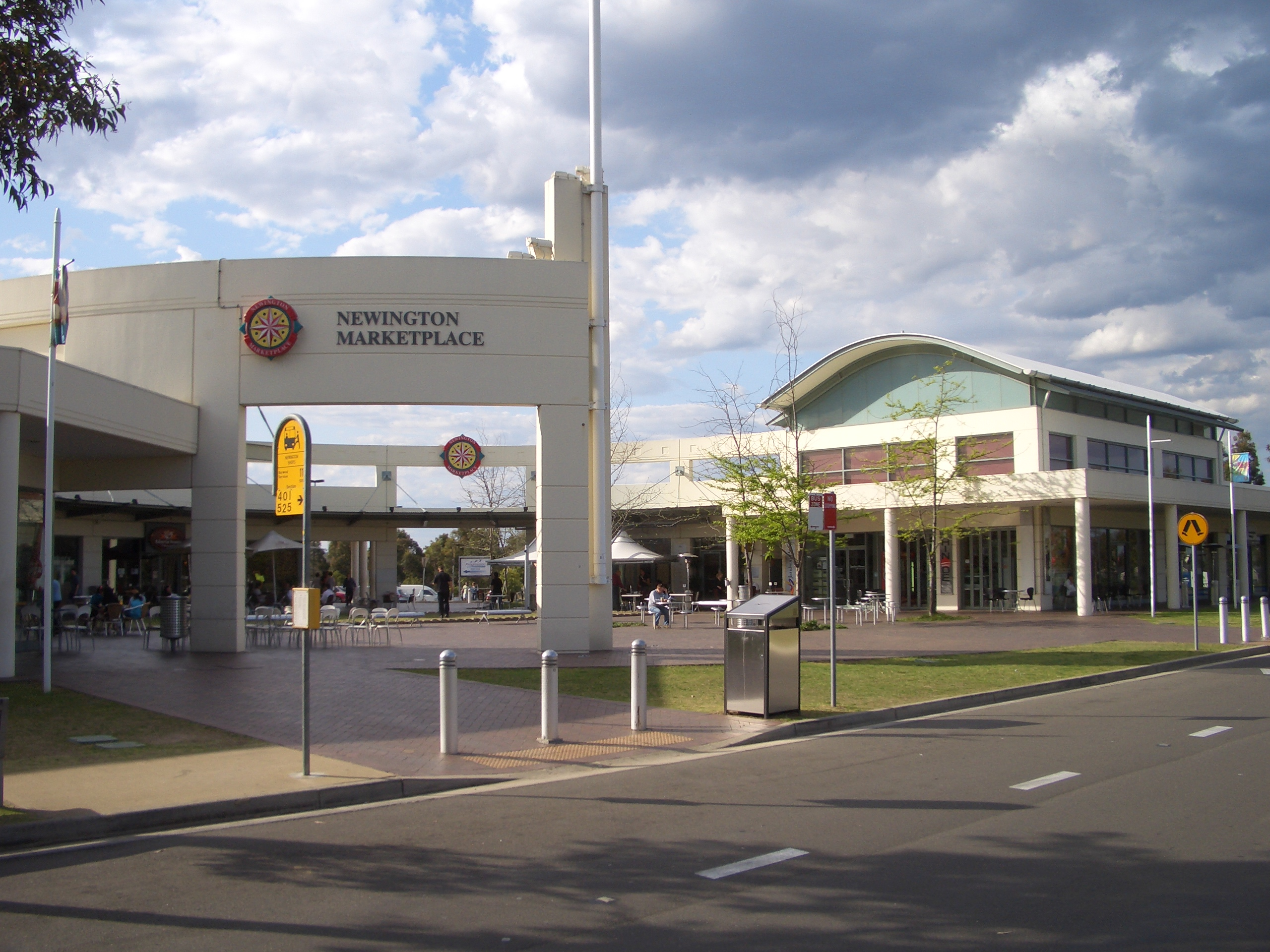
- Newington Marketplace

- Interactive map of Newington
- Country: Australia
- State: New South Wales
- City: Sydney
- LGA: City of Parramatta
- Location: 18 km (11 mi) west of Sydney CBD
- Established: 2002

Government
  - State electorate: Parramatta
  - Federal division: Reid

Area
  - Total: 0.93 km^{2} (0.36 sq mi)
- Elevation: 18 m (59 ft)

Population
  - Total: 5,648 (SAL 2021)
- Postcode: 2127
Suburbs around Newington
Silverwater	Ermington	Wentworth Point
Silverwater	Newington	Sydney Olympic Park
Auburn	Lidcombe	Lidcombe

Newington is a suburb in Western Sydney, in the state of New South Wales, Australia. It is 16 kilometres west of the Sydney central business district, in the local government area of City of Parramatta.

Newington is 2 km west of Wentworth Point, on the Parramatta River, 1 km north-west of Sydney Olympic Park. It is best known as the location of the Athletes Village for the 2000 Summer Olympics and 2000 Summer Paralympics. Whilst also housing inmates of Silverwater Jail. The Athlete's Village was converted to residential apartments after the Olympic Games and Paralympic Games. Other apartments and free-standing houses have also been built since. A reserve opposite Newington Marketplace memorial features a complete roster of the Australian team at the 2000 Summer Olympics and 2000 Summer Paralympics.

== History ==
The suburb of Newington took its name from the Newington Estate which was named by John Blaxland after his family estate in Kent, England.

=== Aboriginal culture ===
Newington is situated on the traditional Aboriginal lands of the Wann clan, known as the Wann-gal. The lands of the Wann-gal stretched along the southern shore of the Parramatta River between Cockle Bay (Cadi-gal land) and Parramatta (Burramatta-gal land). The opposite Parramatta River bank was occupied by the Wallumetta-gal.

=== European settlement ===
Within ten days arrival of the First Fleet in Australia, plat records were made of "The Flats", the extensive tidal wetlands at Homebush Bay. From 1788 to 1831, land grants in blocks of 100 to 10,000 acres (40 km^{2}) were distributed to the European settlers from the Wanng-al clans holdings. Official County of Cumberland maps were annotated with the names and boundaries of the new land owners.

In 1807, John Blaxland acquired 520 hectares of land, originally reserve grants of Waterhouse, Shortland, Archer and Haslam. He named the estate Newington after his family estate in Kent, England. Blaxland established a series of salt pans on the banks of the Parramatta River and by 1827, was producing 8 tons of salt each week for the Sydney market. Blaxland also established a tweed mill, limekiln and flourmill. Newington House was completed in 1832 and St Augustine's Chapel in 1838.

In 1843, Blaxland mortgaged the property to the Australian Trust Company. The mortgage went unpaid at the time of his death in 1851. John Dobie purchased the property from the Trust Company to paid off the mortgage. The Blaxland family re-purchased the estate from Dobie in 1854 and offered it as security against a large loan. The property was transferred to the Official Assignee of the Insolvent Estate of Edward James Blaxland in 1860 and subsequently leased to the Methodist Church, who established Newington College on the site. The property, extending from near the current Holker Street to the current Carnarvon Street, was sold to John Wetherill in 1877.

Coal mining explorations were undertaken by Blaxland in 1841. He dug several six metre pits which gained the interest of the Australian Mining Company. The two parties reached agreement and, subsequently, undertook several unsuccessful explorations. In 1878, the City of Sydney Coal Company acquired the right to bore for coal at the site. The company drilled to 457 metres with no success. In 1855 the Australian Timber Company formed to exploit the timber stands in the Newington and surrounding areas. In the late 1870s and 1880s, Sydney's suburbs were expanding rapidly and it was hoped that the creation of a residential settlement between the large centres of Sydney and Parramatta would be a profitable exercise. This did not prove to be the case.

In 1878, John Wetherill registered a subdivision plan for the entire 520 hectare Newington Estate. This proposal comprised an extensive grid layout, of some 114 lots, which extended well into the mud flats and mangroves of Wentworth Bay and Homebush Bay. In 1906 and 1909, Wetherill further subdivided his property as Riverside Heights, with the first allotments sold in that year. It was hoped that the location of the subdivision in close proximity to the developing State Abattoir and Brickworks would attract people to the area in association with the employment opportunities offered by these establishments. This venture was largely unsuccessful, with only a few lots being sold. However the layout of the western part of the Newington subdivision remains obvious in the current street pattern and street names.

=== Early public use ===
The Newington Estate was first offered in 1874 to the Government for use as an Asylum for the Insane. The Government did not accept this offer, however in 1879, Government Architect James Barnet prepared a report on the suitability of the Newington estate for a Reformatory School for Boys. His report concluded that the site was suitable for a Boys Reformatory or a Benevolent Asylum for Aged Women. In September 1897 the Crown Solicitor confirmed that 5000 pounds would be paid to John Wetherill to acquire about 19 hectares of land, which included Newington House.

An Aged Women's Asylum was constructed to replace the existing asylum which was housed within the Immigrant Depot at the Hyde Park Barracks. The first buildings were established in 1886 on this new site to house 300 patients. At this time, the hospital was categorised as a state asylum for dependent adults' with infirmity or illness of 'incurable character'. Various additional buildings and structures were added to the Newington Hospital over the years. In 1960 it was proposed that the hospital should be closed and the site sold to industry. The significance of the site, however, stimulated significant public opposition to the plans. In 1968, after a series of drawn out negotiations, the Government of the day decided to close the hospital and transfer the property to the then NSW Department of Prisons. Some of the buildings are preserved in the grounds of the Metropolitan Remand and Reception Centre where they are still in use. In the late 1990s the site was developed by Mirvac and Lend Lease for the purpose of an athletes' village for the 2000 Summer Olympics. Following the conclusion of the Games the site was developed into a new residential suburb by Mirvac.

== Commercial areas ==
Newington Marketplace is an outdoor shopping centre featuring a Woolworths supermarket and specialty shops, cafes and restaurants. Newington also features a number of commercial buildings providing office and warehouse space.

== Schools ==
- Newington Public School (NPS)

== Gallery ==
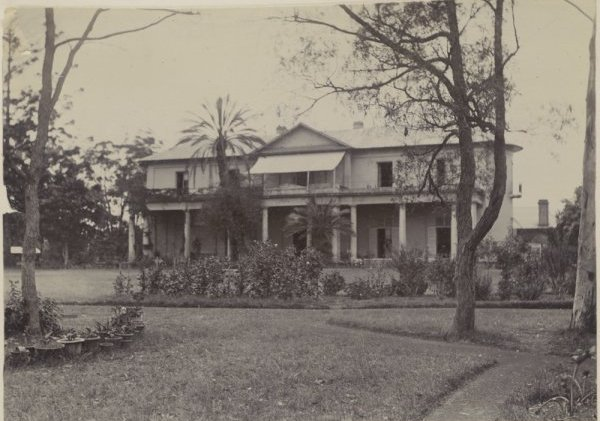
Newington House, Silverwater, c.1894.

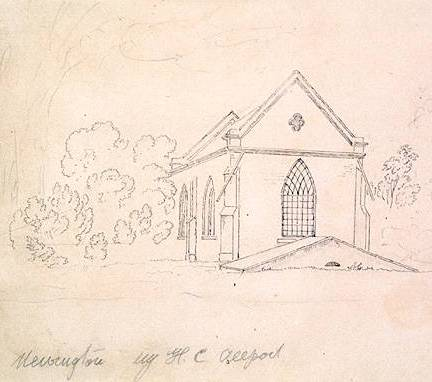
Newington House Chapel, undated drawing.

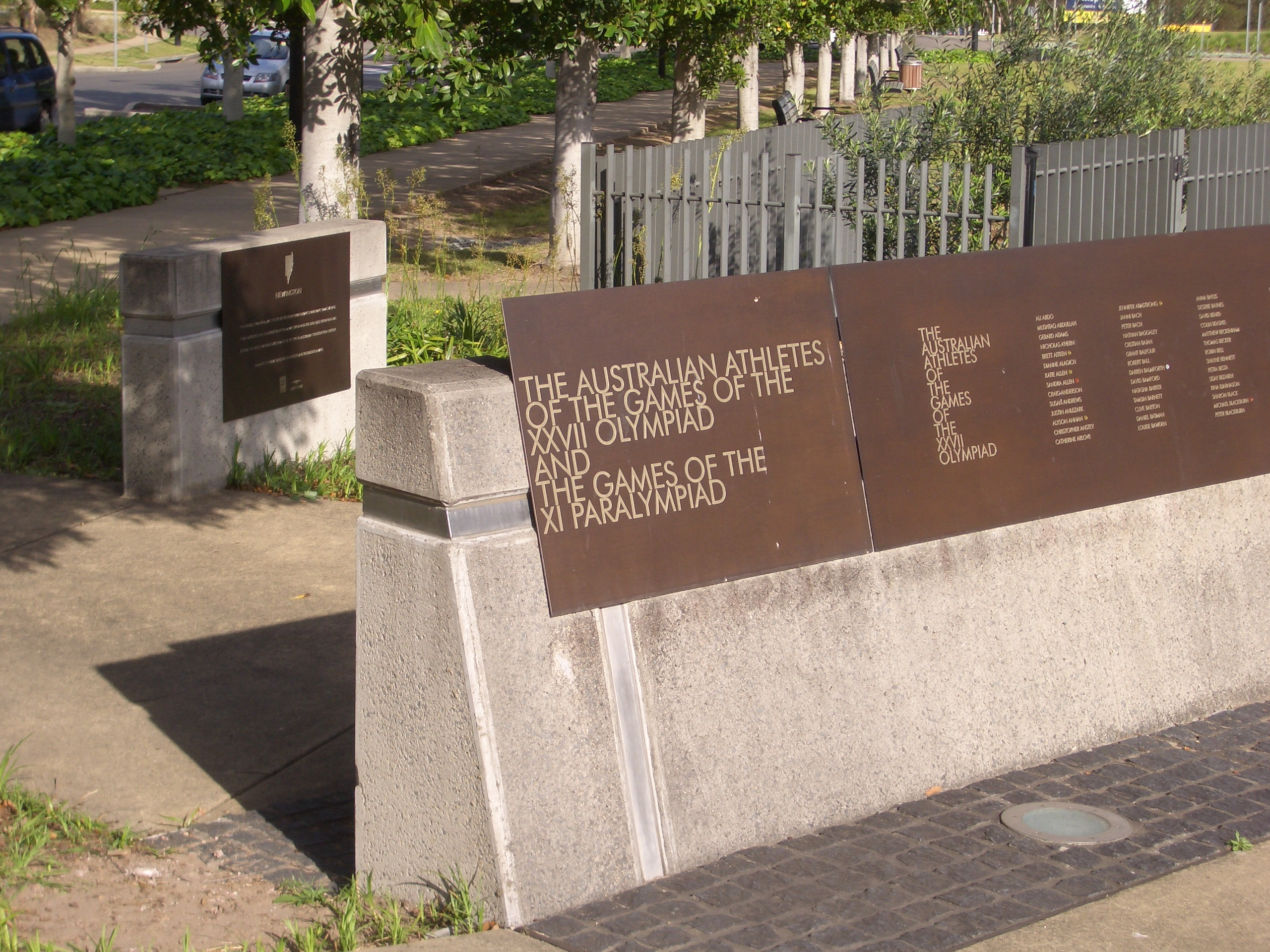
Olympic Village Memorial.

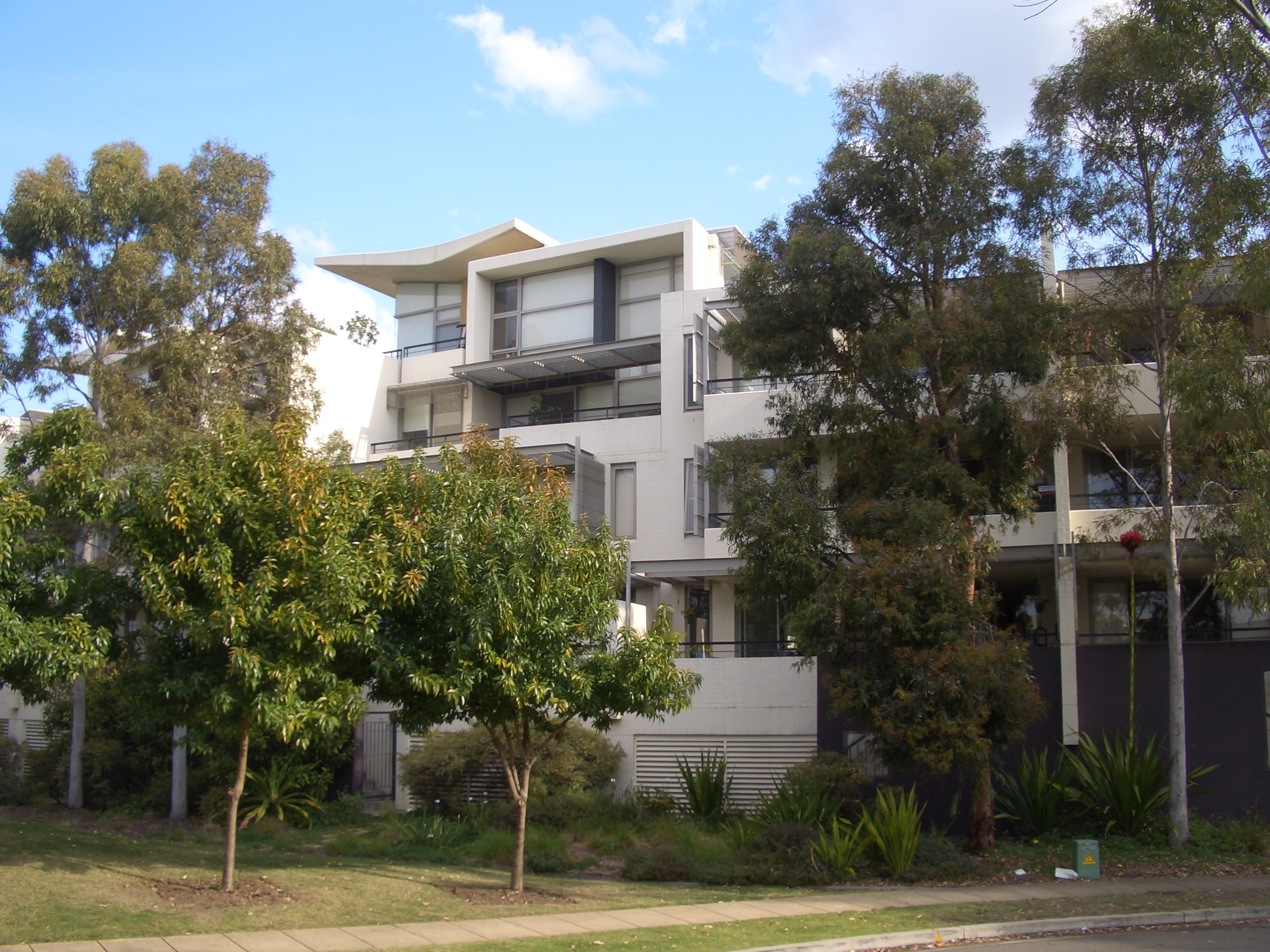
Former Athletes Village.

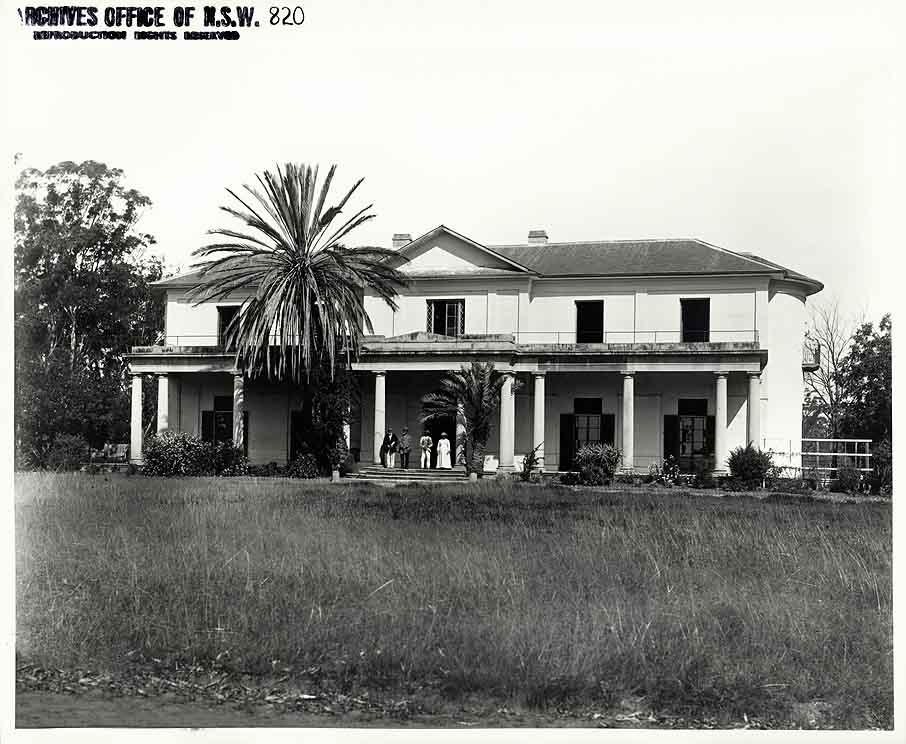
Newington

== See also ==
- Louise Sauvage Pathway
