= Sydney Olympic Park =

- Suburb
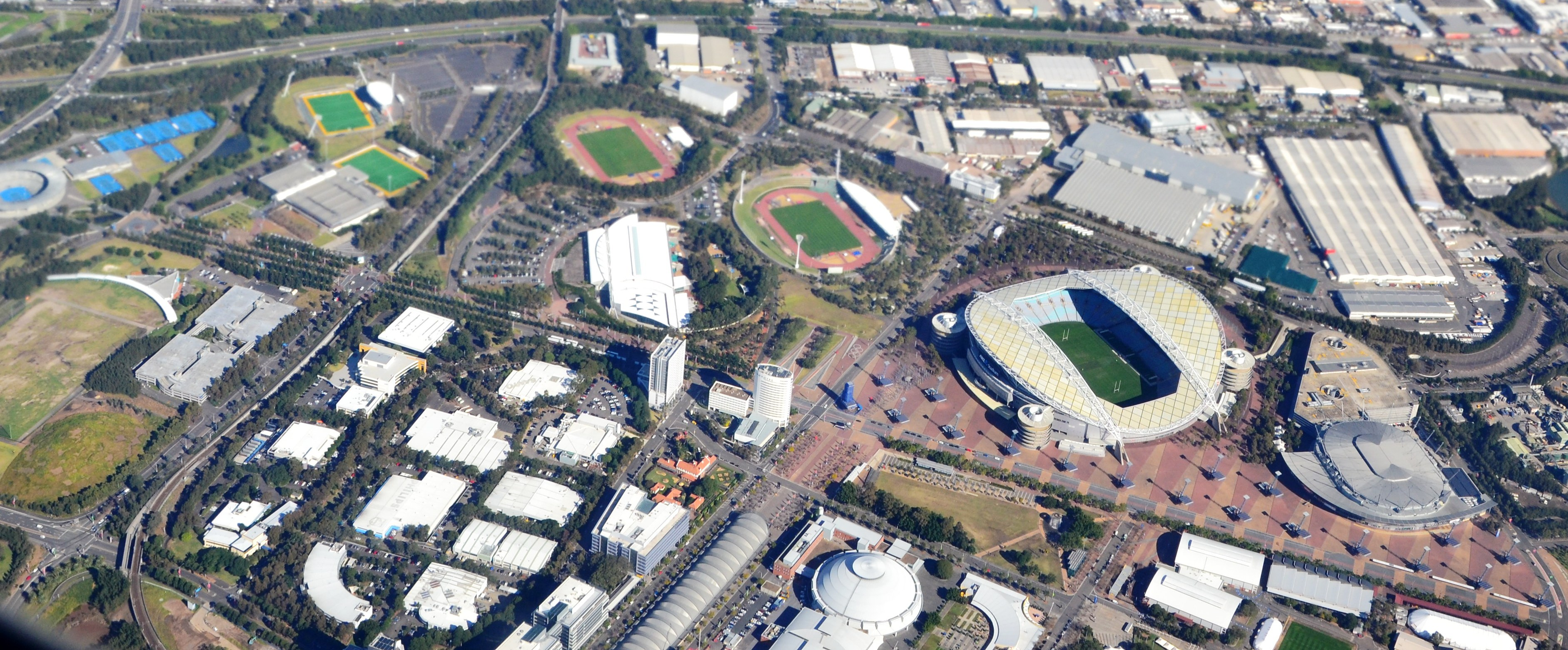
- An aerial view of the Olympic Park in 2012

- Interactive map of Sydney Olympic Park
- Coordinates: 33°50′51″S 151°03′54″E
- Country: Australia
- State: New South Wales
- City: Sydney
- LGA: City of Parramatta
- Location: 20 km (12 mi) west of Sydney CBD
- Established: 1996 (locality) & 2009 (suburb)

Government
  - State electorate: Parramatta
  - Federal division: Reid

Area
  - Total: 6.63 km^{2} (2.56 sq mi)
- Elevation: 15 m (49 ft)

Population
  - Total: 4,848 (2021 census)
  - Density: 731.2/km^{2} (1,893.9/sq mi)
- Postcode: 2127
Suburbs around Sydney Olympic Park
Ermington	Wentworth Point	Rhodes
Newington	Sydney Olympic Park	Liberty Grove
Lidcombe	Flemington	Homebush

Sydney Olympic Park is a suburb of Greater Western Sydney, located 20 kilometres west of the Sydney central business district, in the local government area of the City of Parramatta Council. It is commonly known as Olympic Park but officially named Sydney Olympic Park. The area was part of the suburb of Lidcombe and known as "North Lidcombe", but between 1989 and 2009 was named "Homebush Bay" (part of which is now the separate suburb of Wentworth Point). The names "Homebush Bay" and, sometimes, "Homebush" are still used colloquially as a metonym for Stadium Australia as well as the Olympic Park precinct as a whole, but Homebush is an older, separate suburb to the southeast, in the Municipality of Strathfield.

Sydney Olympic Park features a large sports and entertainment area, originally redeveloped for the Sydney 2000 Olympic and Paralympic Games. The stadiums, arenas and venues continue to be used for sporting, musical, and cultural events, including the Sydney Royal Easter Show, Sydney Festival and a number of world-class sporting fixtures. The suburb also contains commercial developments, residential buildings and extensive parklands.

== History ==
=== Aboriginal land ===
Aboriginal people have been associated with the Homebush Bay area for many thousands of years. When Europeans arrived in 1788, the Homebush Bay area formed part of the traditional lands of the Wanngal clan. The lands of the Wanngal clan extended along the southern shore of the Parramatta River between about Leichhardt and Auburn. The Wanngal clan would have had access rights to the resources of the Homebush Bay area, but would have routinely interacted with neighbouring clan groups.

Shortly after the British colonisation of Sydney several smallpox epidemics ravaged the local Aboriginal population, leaving many of the clans seriously depleted. By way of adaptation, members of neighbouring clan groups are known to have joined to ensure their survival. Aboriginal people were still using the Homebush Bay area in the early 1800s even after their lands were granted to Europeans. Several encounters and conflicts between Europeans and Aboriginal people are documented for the Homebush Bay area throughout the 1790s, and in the early 1800s Aboriginal people (perhaps of the Wanngal clan) were working for and supplying fish to Europeans in the area. No references have yet been located which describe Aboriginal people living in the Homebush Bay area for the period after the 1810s; however, this is the subject of ongoing research through the Aboriginal History & Connections Program, a long-term program aimed at documenting Aboriginal connections to the Homebush Bay area before and after the arrival of Europeans launched by the Sydney Olympic Park Authority in April 2002.

Today the Homebush Bay area is within the asserted traditional cultural boundary of the Darug language group, of which the Wanngal clan is said to have belonged. The descendants of Darug traditional owners of the Sydney area play a custodial role in the preservation of Aboriginal cultural heritage and are actively involved with archaeological and historical research in and around the Homebush Bay area. The area also falls within the administrative boundary of the Metropolitan Local Aboriginal Land Council which also plays a major role in the investigation and preservation of Aboriginal culture and heritage.

=== Colonisation ===
The Sydney Olympic Park locality was first known to Europeans as "The Flats", as described by Lieutenant Bradley in his charting of the river in 1788. The name "Liberty Plains" was also given to the locality but referred to the higher and drier lands along Parramatta Road and referred to the first group of settlers who were free rather than convict, who established farms there in 1793. The first European settler was Thomas Laycock (1756?-1809), who was granted 40 hectares between Parramatta Road and Homebush Bay in October 1794. He named his farm, Home Bush and ran sheep and cattle there. Laycock was Quartermaster of the NSW Corps and also held other government positions. D'Arcy Wentworth (c.1762-1827) purchased the 318 hectare holding from the Laycock family in January 1808. With additional grants Wentworth's holdings at Homebush Bay totalled 372 hectares by 1810. Wentworth established a horse stud and a private racetrack adjoining Parramatta Road and was influential among the early government officials and free settlers. He died at Homebush on 7 July 1827. The village and later suburb of Homebush, New South Wales was not part of the Home Bush Estate: the village was subdivided from Edward Powell's estate further south, and took its name from nearby Homebush railway station, which in turn was named after the Home Bush Estate to its north.

The Home Bush Estate was inherited by William Wentworth (1790–1872), who continued in his father's tradition of controversial public service. With his neighbour Gregory Blaxland, he was in the first exploration party to find a route through the Blue Mountains. He expanded and developed his father's bequest of properties, becoming one of the colony's richest men by his death in 1872. The property was let to numerous tenants throughout William's ownership, while he lived at Vaucluse House in Sydney. William, who was elected president of the Sydney Turf Club in 1832, gave permission for the existing racetrack to be upgraded for public race meetings. The racetrack included grandstands, stables and spelling paddocks which stretched over the Sydney Olympic Park site. The property was inherited by William Wentworth's son, Fitzwilliam. The Wentworth Estate, together with adjoining areas to the south, was proclaimed the Borough of Rookwood on 8 December 1891. The borough became a municipality in 1906, and was renamed the "Municipality of Lidcomb " in 1913. Addresses in the area were subsequently listed under the suburb of Lidcombe and the area was sometimes referred to as "North Lidcombe" Lidcombe merged into the Municipality of Auburn in 1948.

=== State Abattoir and State Brickworks ===
In 1907 367 hectares, most of the Wentworth estate, was resumed for the building of the State Abattoirs. Specifications for the general arrangement and layout of the site and drawings of the gatehouse, administration buildings, mutton, pork, beef and veal houses were completed in 1909 by the Department of Public Works under Government Architect Walter Liberty Vernon and construction completed in 1913. The gardens were also designed in 1913 by Joseph Maiden, Director of the Sydney Botanic Gardens, including the historic formal avenue of trees that is located on the eastern boundary of the Overflow. Consisting of brush box (Lophostemon confertus) and Spotted Gum (Eucalyptus maculata) this row of trees is referred to as "the allee". The cauldron is located in the Overflow, a park just west of the former main abattoir administration precinct and allee, on land which formed a car park for the abattoir.

In 1910, part of the land initially resumed for the State Abattoir was used to build the State Brickworks. Thereafter, the abattoir and the brickworks became the two largest establishments in North Lidcombe.

By 1923 the State Abattoir employed 1,600 people and had a killing capacity of 25,000 animals a week, making it one of the largest abattoirs in Australia. The abattoirs continued to expand during World War II and into the 1950s with works provided for the treatment of offal, refrigeration, the preparation of tallow, fertilizers, meat for export and canning of pet foods (Godden & Associates 1989: 21ff). By the 1970s the facilities required rebuilding and a decision was taken not to upgrade but to redevelop surplus land for industrial use. The State Abattoir officially closed on 10 June 1988 and the Homebush Abattoir Corporation wound up on 30 June 1992. Throughout the twentieth century, much of the current land of the site was reclaimed from the river and wetlands by landfill.

=== Regeneration ===
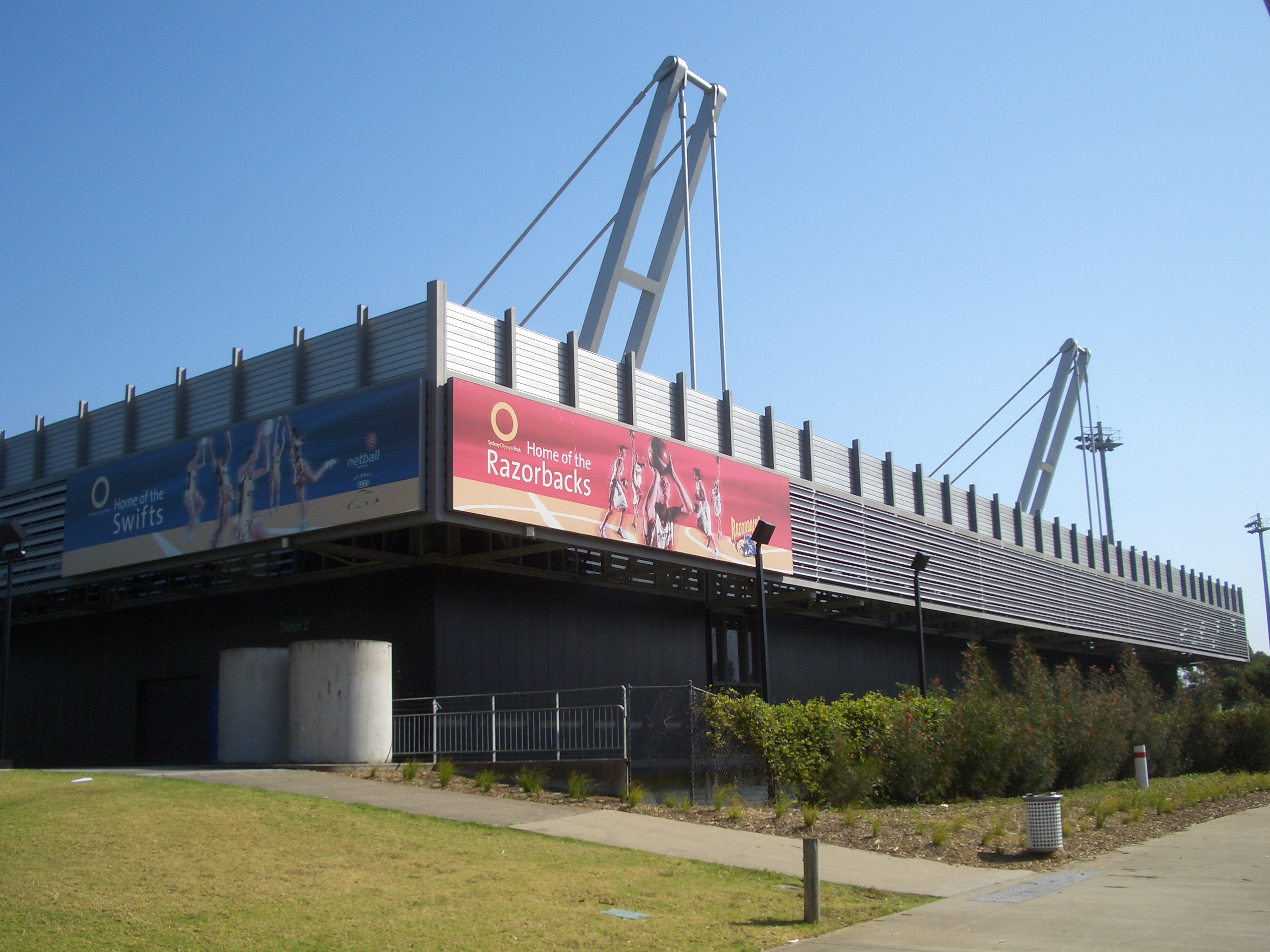
State Sports Centre, built in 1984 it is Olympic Park's oldest venue

In the mid-1980s, an area bounded by Australia Avenue and what are now Herb Elliott Avenue and Sarah Durack Avenue was promoted as a 'technology park' called the Australia Centre. However, apart from a few relatively electronic businesses like AWA Microelectronics, BASF, Philips and Sanyo, the idea did not catch on and the technology park is now in South Eveleigh. In any event, a decade later the entire area became the main cluster venue for the 2000 Summer Olympics.

As part of the regeneration scheme for the area, North Lidcombe was renamed Homebush Bay in 1989, named after the bay to its north and east. After 1992 the abattoir precinct was occupied by a number of organisations that ultimately became the Sydney Olympic Park Authority (SOPA). Sydney won the right to host the Olympic Games on 23 September 1993, after being selected over Beijing, Berlin, Istanbul and Manchester at the 101st IOC Session in Monte Carlo, Monaco.

The industrial activities in the area resulted in a highly contaminated site with little natural ecology and a fragmented stream corridor. Sixty-five percent of the soils were required to be excavated and contained on-site. The site did have some positive attributes that PWP Landscape Architecture enhanced in the design: 15 miles of continuous waterfront; various historic buildings and landscapes; an almost unspoiled 124-acre aboriginal forest; major areas of mangrove swamp; bird sanctuaries; and surviving endangered species like Golden orb spiders and the Green and golden bell frogs that resided in a 70-acre historic limestone quarry, the Brick Pit. Millennium Parklands was and is a project that matches the scale of the city, dealing with landscape as the system that sustains urban life, the Olmstedian "lungs" known these days as "green infrastructure" a component of the urban condition rather than its native opposition.

=== Post-Olympics ===
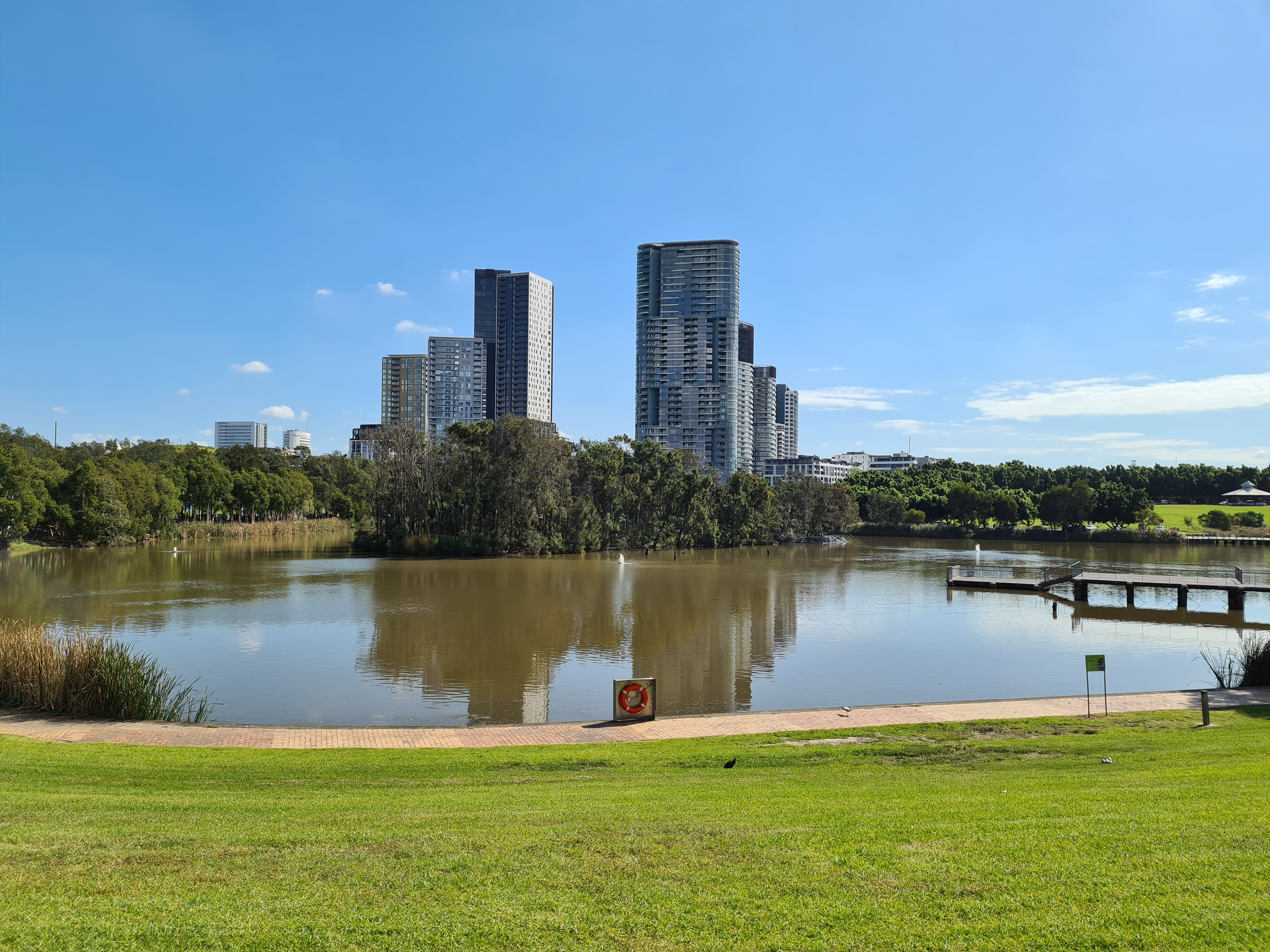
Lake Belvedere, with apartment towers in the background

With the successful completion of the 2000 Olympics, Sydney Olympic Park has undergone a significant amount of development work to support its conversion to a multipurpose facility with a number of businesses re-locating to the area. Commercial developments now sit alongside sporting facilities with tenants in office buildings such as Commonwealth Bank from September 2007. A five-star Pullman hotel and a two-star Formule 1 hotel were completed in mid-2008.

The parklands have undergone redevelopment with Blaxland Riverside Park (formerly Blaxland Common) being transformed into an urban park along Parramatta River. The Park opened on 3 March 2007. In addition the Wentworth Common area was upgraded with significant adventure playground facilities for children aged 8–13 years.

The former Auburn Council sought public comment on a proposal to rename the Homebush Bay area, to remove confusion with its namesake suburb Homebush. The area encompassing Sydney Olympic Park, which made up most of the suburb of Homebush Bay, was given autonomy as a suburb, the waterfront residential area was renamed Wentworth Point and the Carter Street industrial precinct was absorbed by the neighbouring suburb of Lidcombe.

Prior to the 2010s, Sydney Olympic Park was largely uninhabited. Together with Rookwood and Chullora to the south, it formed part of a string of uninhabited suburbs between Inner West Sydney and Greater Western Sydney. However, the suburb has seen substantial residential development in the 2010s. In the 2011 census, its population was only 65 people, but by the 2016 census five years later, this had grown dramatically to 1736. By 2021 this number had grown again to 4848.

On 10 May 2021, a COVID-19 mass vaccination hub opened in a commercial building in the suburb of Sydney Olympic Park.

On 17 July 2023, the suburb boundary was amended with some area surrounding Wentworth Point becoming part of the latter. This included the "Jewel Residences" and the adjacent Sydney Olympic Park ferry wharf on the northern side of Burroway Road, as well as the "Sanctuary" development area on the western side of Hill Road.

Sydney Olympic Park Authority (SOPA), Master Plan 2050 replaces the previously approved Master Plan 2030.

== Heritage listings ==
Sydney Olympic Park has a number of heritage-listed sites, including:

- Cathy Freeman Park near corner of Olympic Boulevard and the Grand Parade: 2000 Summer Olympics cauldron
- Holker Street: Newington Armament Depot and Nature Reserve
- Australia Avenue, State Sports Centre: New South Wales Hall of Champions Collection

== Events ==
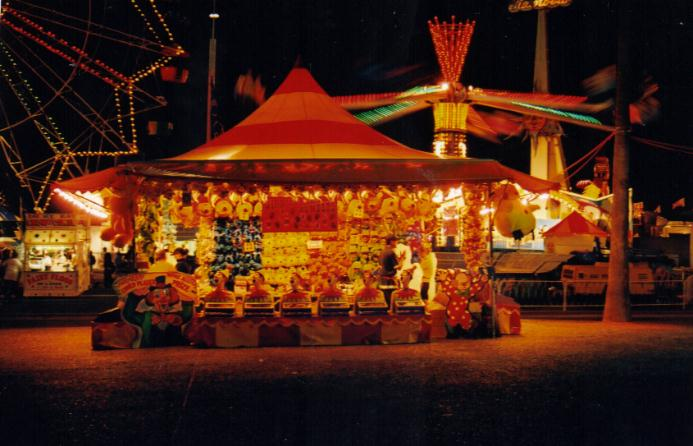
The Sydney Royal Easter Show is held at Sydney Olympic Park every Easter.

More than 5000 events are held at Sydney Olympic Park each year, including the Sydney Royal Easter Show, Supanova Pop Culture Expo, Rugby Union, National Rugby League, Australian Football League and Australian Rugby League games at Stadium Australia. The Sydney International is held each year at the Sydney Olympic Park Tennis Centre, and the park also hosts athletics and swimming events, using some venues for concerts during the year, and hosts boxing. It hosts the Big Day Out music festival and has been the venue for free, open air performances as part of the Sydney Festival such as Movies in the Overflow and Music by Moonlight.

The Newington Armory has in the past been the venue for the now-defunct "Great Escape" and "Acoustica at the Armory" music festivals, both of which were held over the Easter long weekend. Some venues function have changed from the original uses in the 2000 Olympics, such as the baseball stadium which has become the Sydney Showground; the former Sydney Superdome is now known as Afterpay Arena and the Olympic Stadium has been renamed a number of times, currently Accor Stadium. The latter two venues are now very successful in their own right, with the stadium serving as the venue for 49 major sporting events in 2007 and the Arena being the world's second-highest grossing venue of its type in the world in 2005 - behind only New York City's Madison Square Garden.

A funeral was held for the Lin family at Sydney Olympic Park on 8 August 2009, with the only surviving member, Brenda Lin, in attendance.

Between 2009 and 2016, the Sydney 500 V8 Supercar event was held through the streets of the Olympic precinct. EB Games Expo was also hosted at The Sydney Showgrounds within Sydney Olympic Park between 2012 and 2016 present.

During October 2018 the Invictus Games for wounded, injured and ill war veterans was hosted in the Sydney Olympic park as the fourth competition of its type, this was the first Invictus games held in the southern hemisphere.

Large hip-hop music festival Rolling Loud was held on 29 January 2019. Performers included Future, Rae Sremmurd, YG, Tyga, Playboi Carti, Gunna, Manu Crooks, Smokepurpp, Lil Uzi Vert, who was billed as a surprise guest, and a tribute set for the late XXXTentacion.

== Culture ==
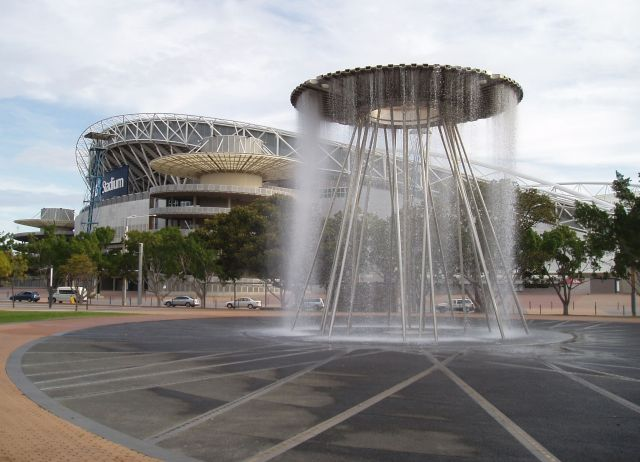
Olympic Cauldron

The suburb is home to a significant arts and cultural program including regular events, the largest single precinct public art collection in Australia, the Armoury Gallery which is the largest single room permanent art exhibition space in the Southern Hemisphere, a new theatre, an artist studio facility at Newington Armoury and a BMX track. The suburb is fully dedicated to environmentally and socially sustainable practices and has committed to 'Master Plan 2030': an opportunity to establish a best practice example of sustainable urban development for the next 20 years of the Park's growth.

The Master Plan 2030 vision is that the Park will, by 2030, be home to a daily population of 50,000 residents, students and workers, in addition to 10 million visitors per year.

== Demographics ==
In the 2021 Census, there were 4,848 people in Sydney Olympic Park, an increase of 179% from its population of 1,736 at the 2016 Census, and 7,358% in the decade since the 2011 Census, when the suburb had only 65 residents.

In 2021, 28.4% of people were born in Australia. The next most common countries of birth were China 18.1% and South Korea 10.3%. The most common reported ancestries were Chinese 28.8%, Korean 12.6%, English 11.1%, Australian 7.2% and Indian 5.2%. 26.6% of people spoke only English at home. Other languages spoken at home included Mandarin 19.6% and Korean 12.1%. The most common response for religion was No Religion at 43.0%.

== Governance and management ==
Sydney Olympic Park was part of Auburn Council at the time of its creation. When Auburn Council was abolished, it was absorbed by the City of Parramatta.

However, in practice, the Sydney Olympic Park Authority, the state government body which manages Sydney Olympic Park, has considerable autonomy and in many matters its powers are similar to that of a local government.

Sydney Olympic Park Authority is the successor of the Homebush Bay Development Corporation, which was originally established to manage the large-scale urban renewal project for the Homebush Bay area after industry moved out. After the site was nominated for the 2000 Olympics bid, in 1995 the Homebush Bay Development Corporation became the Olympic Co-ordination Authority. After the games, in 2001, it became the Sydney Olympic Park Authority. The Authority also remains a significant land owner in the area, having inherited land that was already owned by the state government or acquired for the purpose of the Olympics.

== Facilities ==
Interactive map

=== Sydney 2000 Olympics venues ===
- Stadium Australia - (capacity: 110,000 at time of Olympics, now 83,500)
- Afterpay Arena - formerly Sydney Superdome, Acer Arena, Allphones Arena, and Qudos Bank Arena (capacity: Concert 21,032; Basketball 18,200; Gymnastics 15,000)
- Sydney Showground Formerly Sydney Baseball Stadium - Home of Sydney's Royal Easter Show. Includes Sydney Showground Stadium (capacity: 21,500 from 1998 to 2011, 24,000 from 2012).
- Sydney Olympic Park Athletic Centre (capacity: Grandstand 5,000; Grass 10,000)
- Sydney Olympic Park Aquatic Centre - Formerly Sydney International Aquatic Centre (capacity: 17,500 at time of Olympics, now 10,000)
- Sydney Olympic Park Tennis Centre (capacity: 10,000)
- Sydney Olympic Park Hockey Centre (capacity: 15,000 at time of Olympics, now 8,000)
- Sydney Olympic Park Sports Centre (capacity: 5,006)
- Sydney International Archery Park (capacity: 4,500)
- Sydney Olympic Park Sports Halls
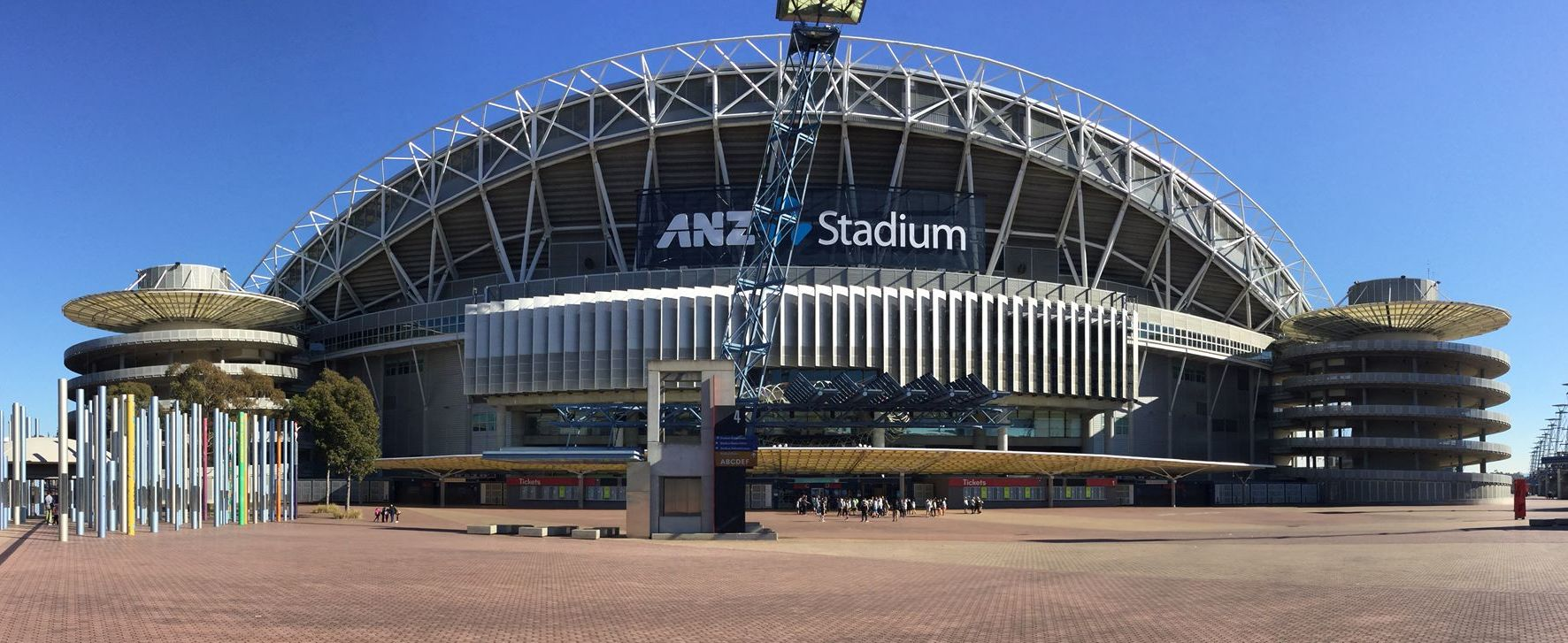
Stadium Australia - the second largest stadium in the southern hemisphere

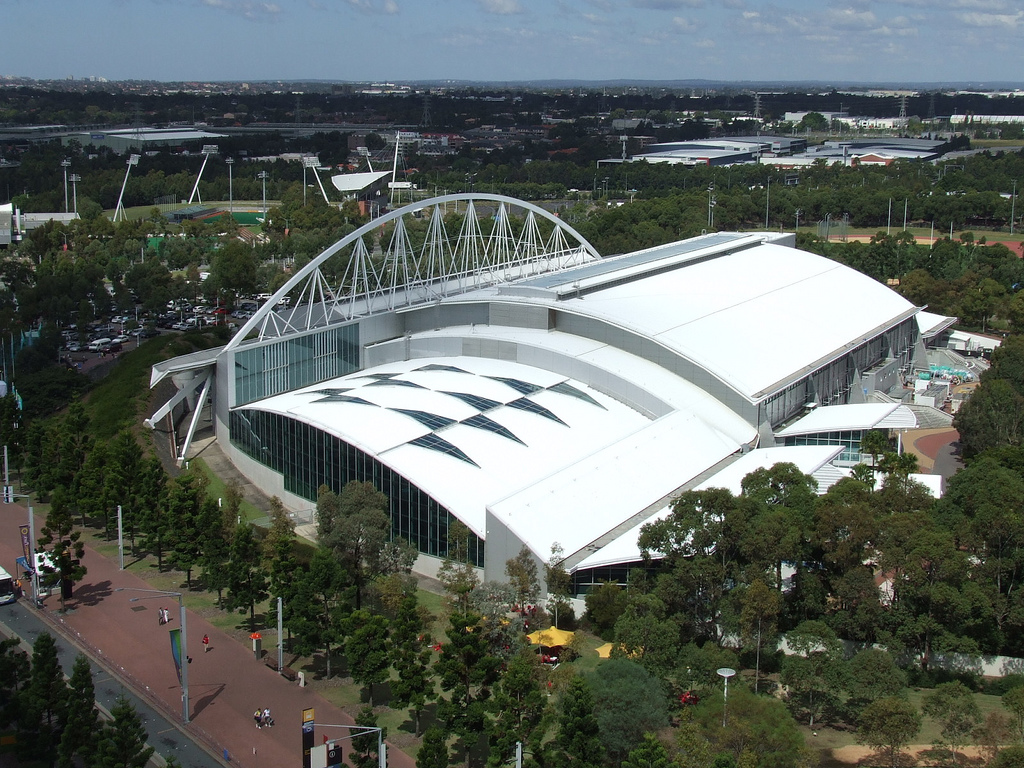
Sydney Olympic Park Aquatic Centre

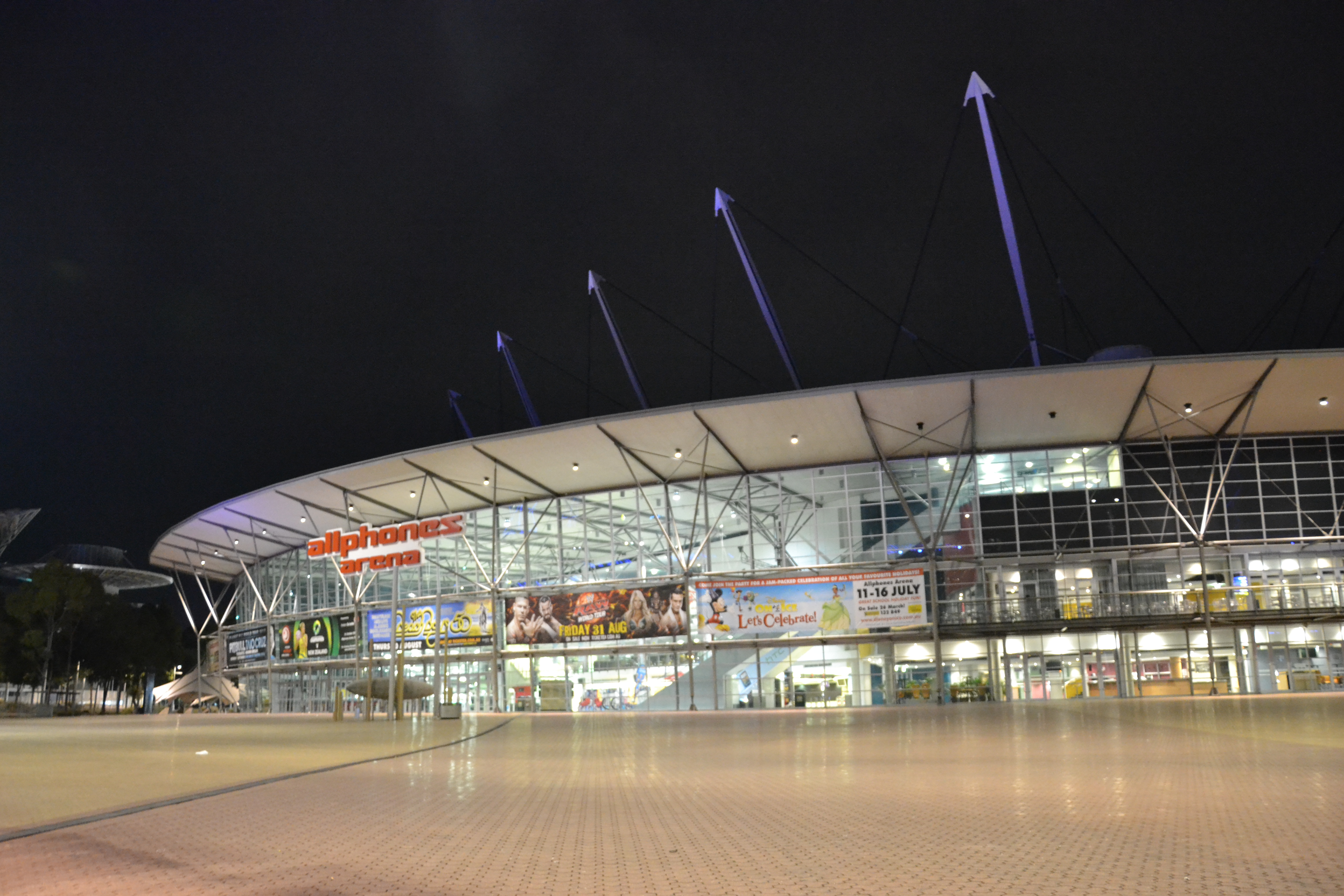
Afterpay Arena

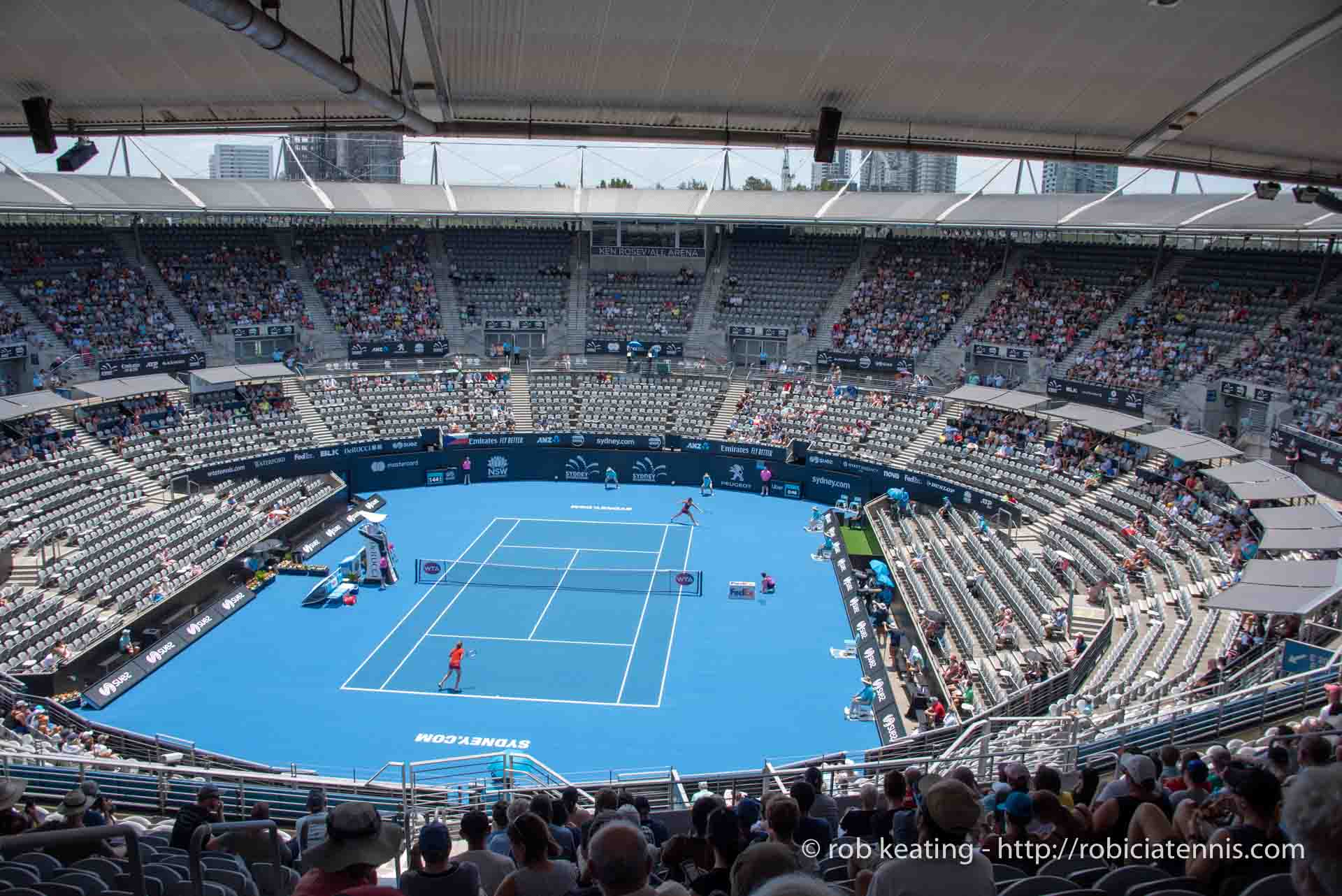
Ken Rosewall Arena

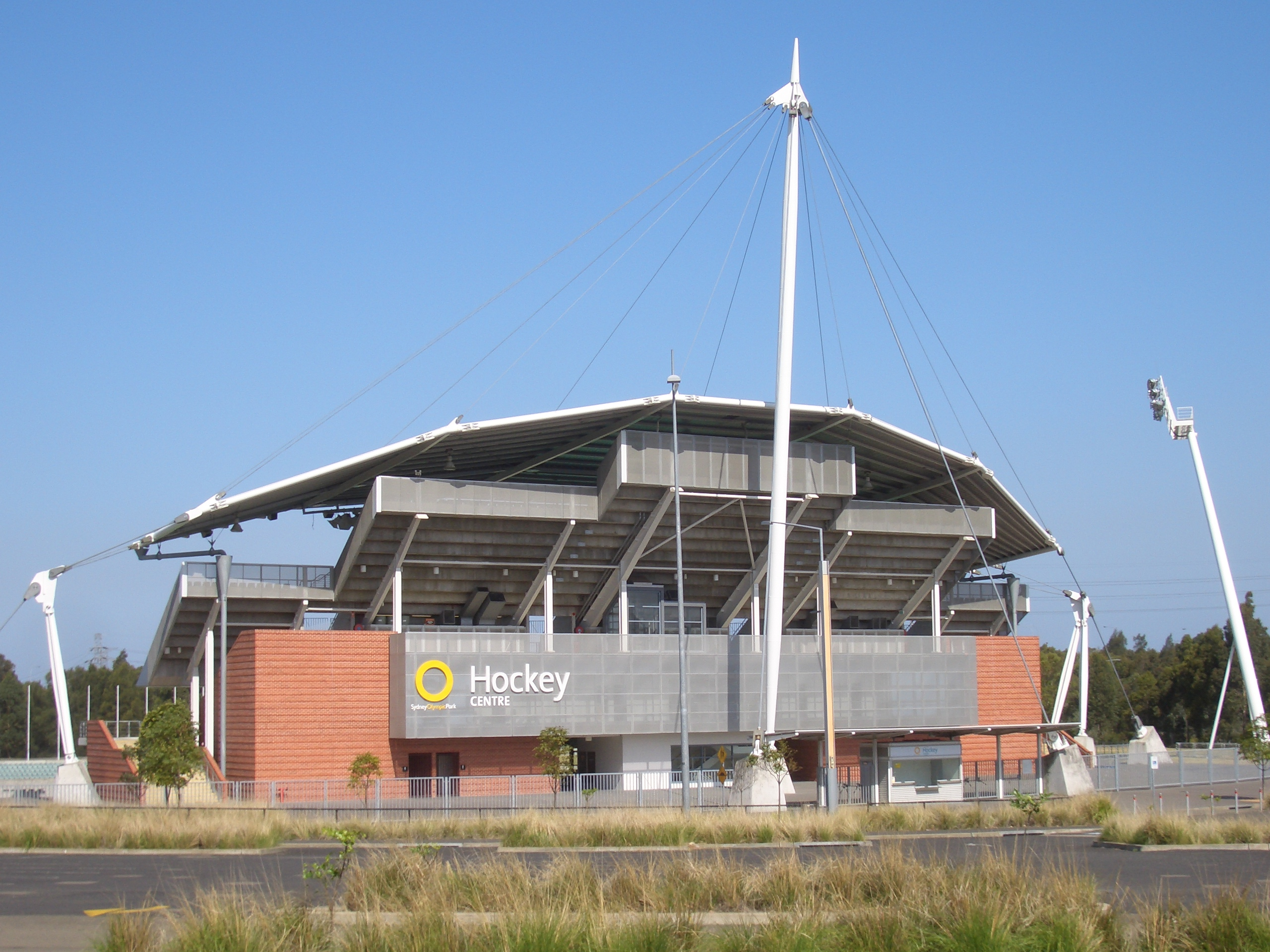
Sydney Olympic Park Hockey Centre

=== Non-Olympic facilities ===
- Monster Mountain X - Mountain Biking
- Monster BMX
- Monster Skate Park
- Newington Armory Gallery and Theatre
- Netball Central, Sydney Olympic Park

=== Accommodation ===
- Novotel and Ibis Hotel, Sydney Olympic Park
- Pullman, Sydney Olympic Park
- Ibis Budget, Sydney Olympic Park
- Sydney Olympic Park Lodge - Newington Armory
- Former Olympic Village - now suburb of Newington

=== Transport ===
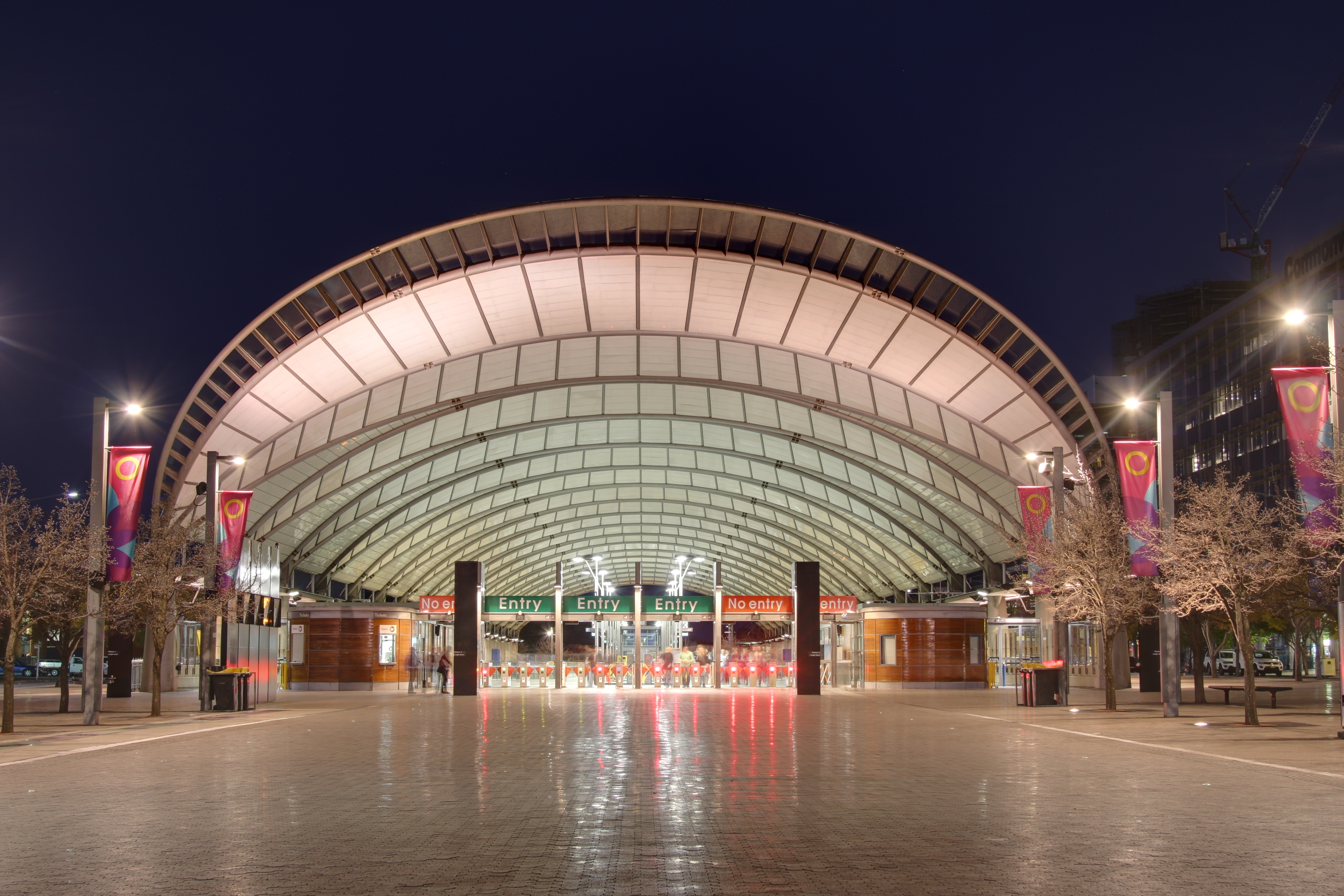
Olympic Park railway station

Sydney Olympic Park is served by the Olympic Park railway line and Olympic Park station. There are also regular ferry services to the nearby Sydney Olympic Park ferry wharf, at the end of Hill Road, serviced by Sydney Ferries to and from various points around Sydney Harbour.

During major events, Sydney Olympic Park bus routes operate.

The two-line Parramatta Light Rail project was announced in 2015. Original plans included a line between Westmead and Strathfield, passing through Sydney Olympic Park. Plans for this line were redesigned and truncated in 2017. The redesigned line will terminate at Sydney Olympic Park instead of continuing to Strathfield.

Sydney Metro West is a proposed metro line between the Sydney Central Business District and Westmead. The line was announced in 2016 and would include a station at Sydney Olympic Park.

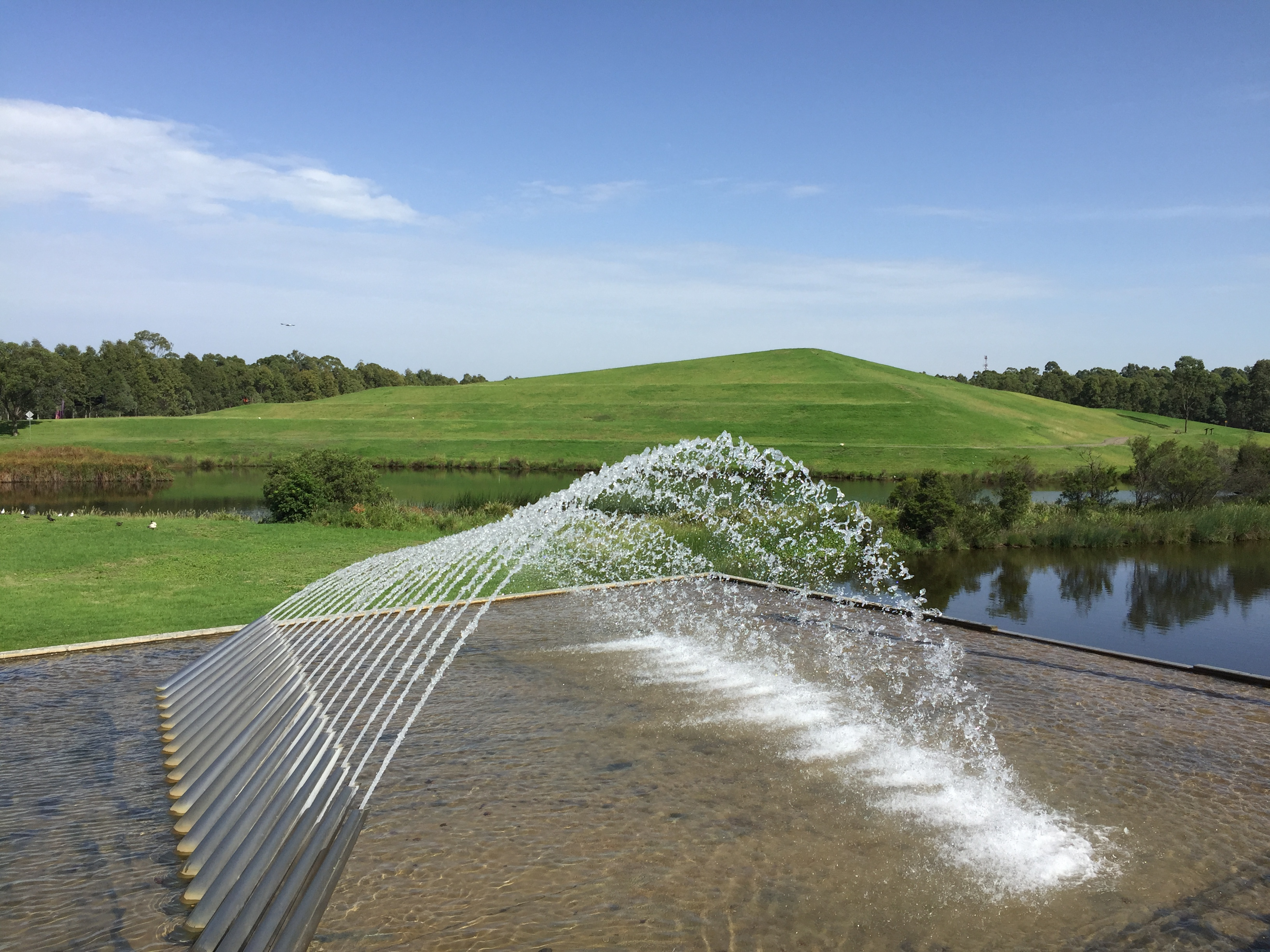
The Pyramid

=== Parklands ===
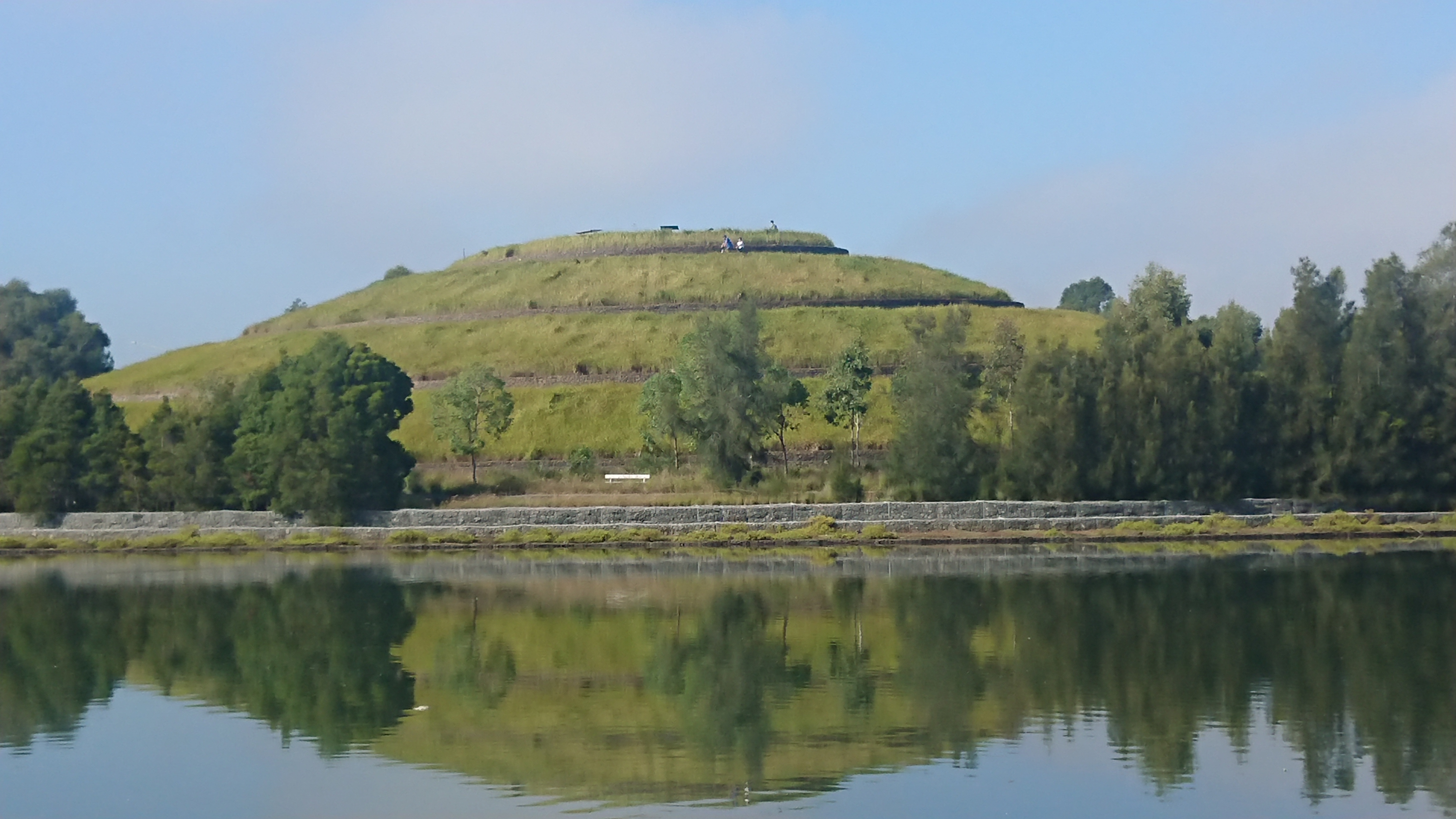
The shared path up the spiral mountain on Haslams creek in the south western corner of the park

- Bicentennial Park; 40 ha (99 acres) of parkland, opened in 1988 to celebrate Australia's Bicentenary
- Wentworth Common
- Archery Park
- Blaxland Riverside Park along Parramatta River
- Narawang Wetlands and Louise Sauvage Pathway
- The Brickpit and Brickpit Ring Walk
- 425 ha (1,050 acres) of parkland throughout the Sydney Olympic Park site

=== Restricted areas ===
- Newington Armory - Former Armory Store for the Royal Australian Navy - limited public access related to events and Sunday open days
- Newington Nature Reserve

=== Tom Wills Oval ===
Located at Olympic Boulevard and adjacent to the netball arena the Quaycentre, the Tom Wills Oval (known for sponsorship purposes as the WestConnex Centre) is the training ground and headquarters of professional Australian Football League club the GWS Giants. The Giants play home matches at the nearby Showground Stadium. The club moved into the facility in May 2013. As well as featuring a full-size training field, the facility also has a high-performance centre for indoor training and administration.

The facility is named after Tom Wills, one of the founders of Australian rules football, who was born in the colony of New South Wales.

In April 2013, an A$11.6 million redevelopment of a former golf driving range became the Tom Wills Oval. The facility opened on 6 May 2013 and was named "Tom Wills Oval".

In 2021, reports emerged that Tom Wills had been involved in reprisal attacks against Indigenous people following the Cullin-la-ringo massacre in 1861, which prompted calls to change the oval's name.

Tom Wills Oval hosted its first Victorian Football League (VFL) match in 2023, when the Giants played Southport.

The ground has a capacity of 1,000 people and has limited spectator facilities.

== Climate ==
The Olympic Park area has a humid subtropical climate (Cfa) with slightly warmer summers than in coastal Sydney, and mild to cool winters.

Climate data for Sydney Olympic Park (2011–present)
Month	Jan	Feb	Mar	Apr	May	Jun	Jul	Aug	Sep	Oct	Nov	Dec	Year
Record high °C (°F)	47.1 (116.8)	43.9 (111.0)	38.5 (101.3)	35.8 (96.4)	28.5 (83.3)	23.1 (73.6)	26.7 (80.1)	30.3 (86.5)	35.7 (96.3)	37.8 (100.0)	41.6 (106.9)	44.4 (111.9)	47.1 (116.8)
Mean daily maximum °C (°F)	28.9 (84.0)	27.8 (82.0)	26.7 (80.1)	24.4 (75.9)	21.4 (70.5)	18.4 (65.1)	18.6 (65.5)	20.0 (68.0)	22.8 (73.0)	24.9 (76.8)	25.9 (78.6)	27.7 (81.9)	24.0 (75.2)
Mean daily minimum °C (°F)	19.4 (66.9)	18.8 (65.8)	17.5 (63.5)	13.9 (57.0)	9.9 (49.8)	7.9 (46.2)	6.6 (43.9)	7.2 (45.0)	9.8 (49.6)	13.0 (55.4)	15.5 (59.9)	17.5 (63.5)	13.1 (55.6)
Record low °C (°F)	12.5 (54.5)	12.6 (54.7)	10.8 (51.4)	7.1 (44.8)	2.9 (37.2)	1.8 (35.2)	−0.9 (30.4)	1.7 (35.1)	2.3 (36.1)	6.4 (43.5)	8.4 (47.1)	10.1 (50.2)	−0.9 (30.4)
Average precipitation mm (inches)	121.4 (4.78)	148.0 (5.83)	181.1 (7.13)	92.6 (3.65)	45.3 (1.78)	112.0 (4.41)	56.7 (2.23)	59.1 (2.33)	47.0 (1.85)	64.8 (2.55)	80.6 (3.17)	75.5 (2.97)	1,068.8 (42.08)
Average precipitation days (≥ 1.0 mm)	7.9	9.2	11.5	7.2	4.8	7.2	6.3	5.2	5.6	6.8	7.3	7.3	86.3
Source: Sydney Olympic Park (archery centre)
