= Amy Edwards =

Australian actor and singer

- Born: Amy Yvette Edwards; Sydney, Australia
- Occupations: actor, singer
- Website: Official website

Amy Edwards is an Australian actor and singer, perhaps best known for playing Michelle Thomas on the Australian television series, All Saints on Channel 7 and for her roles in the musicals Priscilla, Queen of the Desert and The Lion King.

== Biography ==
=== Early life ===
Amy grew up on New South Wales’ Central Coast and began dance lessons at the age of seven, acting lessons at the age of nine and singing lesson when she was 11 years old.

Amy attended The McDonald College of Performing Arts in North Strathfield, New South Wales where she studied drama, music and dance.

In 2005, Amy starred in All Saints, playing 'Michelle Thomas', an abused prostitute, before going on to play a variety of roles, including Sarabi, in the Australian production of The Lion King.

Amy's next major role would come in 2009 when she appeared in the original West End production of Priscilla, Queen of the Desert. As the show's assistant dance captain and swing, she appeared as a Diva, Cynthia and Marion during her two-year run.

== Filmography ==
- 2005: All Saints .... Michelle Thomas
- 2003: Comedy Inc. .... Various Characters

== Notable performances ==
- 2011: Priscilla, Queen of the Desert .... Diva / Swing
- 2007: Human Nature Motown Tour ... Naturelle
- 2005: The Lion King ... Sarabi / Swing
