= The McDonald College =

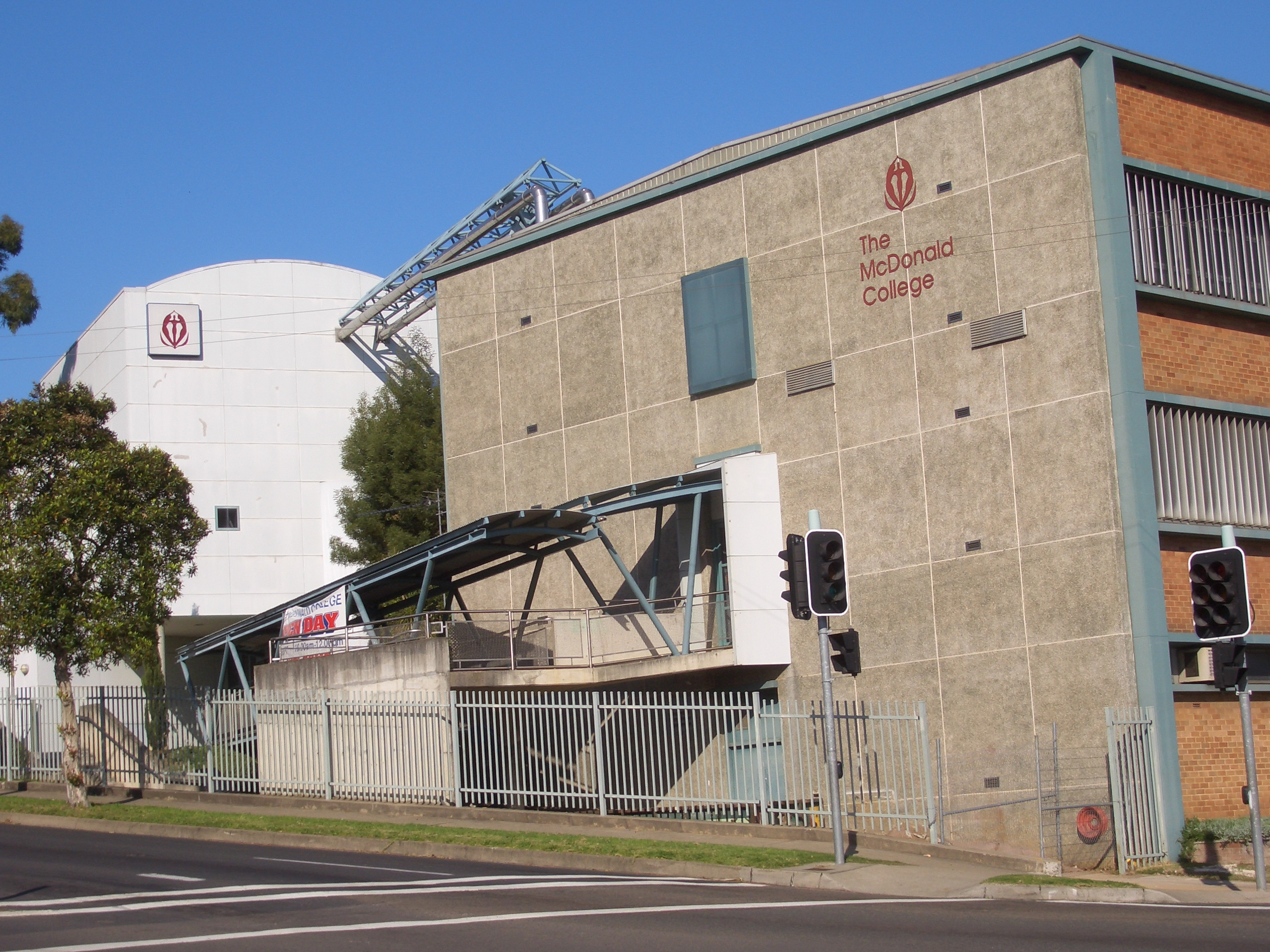
- Primary building of The McDonald College (pictured in 2007)

Location
- North Strathfield, Inner West, Sydney; Australia; 33°51′30″S 151°5′13″E

Information
- Former name: Ann McDonald College of Dancing
- Type: Independent co-educational specialist primary and secondary day and boarding school
- Established: 1984; 42 years ago
- Founder: Ann McDonald
- Specialist: Creative and performing arts
- Principal: Maxine Kohler
- Employees: ~45
- Years: Kindergarten to Year 12
- Enrolment: 300 (2006)
- Colours: Red, navy and white
- Slogan: Discover Your Journey
- Affiliations: Association of Heads of Independent Schools of Australia; Junior School Heads Association of Australia; Australian Boarding Schools' Association; Association of Independent Schools of New South Wales
- Website: www.mcdonald.nsw.edu.au

The McDonald College, formerly Ann McDonald College of Dancing, is a school in Sydney, Australia. It is an independent co-educational specialist primary and secondary day and boarding school with speciality in the creative and performing arts, located in North Strathfield, an inner western suburb.

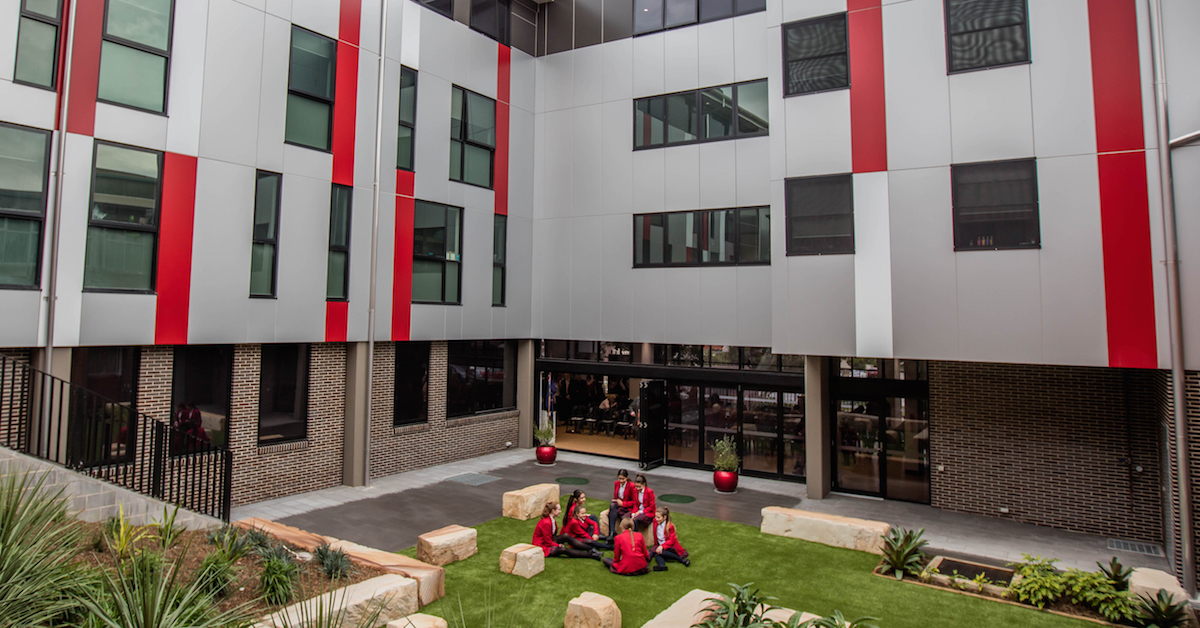
The McDonald College – Markkam House

Established in 1984, the school catered for approximately 300 students from Kindergarten to Year 12 in 2006, including 45 boarders of all genders from Year 7 to Year 12. It is Australia's only Kindergarten to Year 12 independent school that provides specialist training in the performing arts on a daily basis.

The college is a member of the Association of Heads of Independent Schools of Australia (AHISA), the Junior School Heads Association of Australia (JSHAA), the Australian Boarding Schools' Association (ABSA), and the Association of Independent Schools of New South Wales (AISNSW).

== History ==
While officially established in 1984, The McDonald College has a tradition and history dating back to the establishment of the Ann McDonald College of Dancing by Ann McDonald, a dance and singing teacher, in 1926.

On Ann McDonald's retirement her daughter, Margaret Markham, took over the Ann McDonald College of Dancing. In 1983 Markham saw the opportunity for establishing a specialist academic and performing arts school for gifted children, and subsequently, in partnership with Ann Fraser and Maxine Kohler, agreed to change the Ann McDonald College of Dancing from a private company into a community-based, not-for-profit company limited by guarantee, thus facilitating the establishment of The McDonald College Limited.

The McDonald College commenced in 1984 with 75 students in Strathfield. The school moved to its current campus, formerly the site of the Telstra Training School, in North Strathfield in 1999.

== Campus ==
Since 1999 the McDonald College has been located at North Strathfield, adjacent to North Strathfield Station. The school is close to the Olympic site and Bicentennial Park, and is 25 minutes from the Sydney central business district.

Facilities include air-conditioned classrooms, science and computer laboratories, art studios and exhibition space, nine dance studios, music studios and recital room, acting studios and performance spaces, television studio, recording studio, library, canteen, adjoining facilities and play equipment for junior students, and a boarding residence for up to 45 students of all genders.

== Curriculum ==
The McDonald College is registered and accredited by the New South Wales Education Standards Authority and therefore follows the mandated curriculum for all years. The school combines the academic curriculum together with an industry based performance program. These two areas of study complement each other, giving the students a broad, creative and engaging education.

=== Primary ===
The academic program is designed to ensure students achieve age appropriate developmental and learning goals. Students also have access to specialist performing arts programs including drama, dance and music

Junior School (Kindergarten to Year 6) students participate in performing arts, together with the Key Learning Areas as set out by the NSW Education Standards Authority. A Gifted and Talented program is integrated at this stage to cater for students identified as 'academically gifted'.

=== Secondary ===
The Stage 4 academic curriculum consists of the mandatory subjects English, History and Geography, all levels of Mathematics, Science, PDHPE and the Creative Arts. Specialist staff are used for subjects such as Design & Technology, Visual Arts, Music and PDHPE (Personal Development, Health and Physical Education). In Stage 5, i.e. years 9 and 10, students begin accumulating grades for their Record of School Achievement (ROSA). Students continue with the mandatory subjects from Stage 4 and also choose 2 electives. The performing arts program is an extension to the mandated academic curriculum and typically supports much of the study in the elective courses and study a language other than English. Students participate in a performing arts program for two hours each day. Students experiencing learning difficulties are assisted through the Learning Enrichment Department. In Stage 6 (Years 11 and 12) students have the opportunity to select all their subjects, except English which is compulsory. Some students choose to study a TVET course to complement their other subjects. Pathways is also an option for some students who want to complete their HSC in a longer timeframe (up to five years).

The senior students' programme is specifically geared towards helping them prepare for their futures beyond the Higher School Certificate.

=== Performing arts ===
Junior School Students in the Junior School have a choice between studying acting or dance (with a classical ballet base) three days per week for 1 1/2 hours each day. On day four, the students choose an elective of jazz dance, acting or sport and on day five, the students choose between learning a musical instrument or musical theatre.

Secondary School Students choose a core area of study from acting, classical ballet, dance music or musical theatre. The selected core area will be studied for four days per week (Monday, Wednesday, Thursday, Friday), two hours per day. On the fifth day (Tuesday) students choose and elective area of study from classical ballet, acting, tap dance, music or sport for two hours.

== Notable alumni ==
- Emma Watkins – member of children's group The Wiggles
- Nikki Webster – singer (also attended MLC School)
- Natalie Imbruglia – singer
- Rhys Wakefield – actor, best known for his role as 'Lucas Holden' on Home and Away
- Luke Baines – actor and model
- Josef Brown – dancer and actor. Former soloist with The Australian Ballet, Matt Turner on Neighbours
- Kathleen de Leon Jones – member of children's group Hi-5; theatre and television actress
- Amy Edwards – actor/singer/dancer, original cast member of the West End production of Priscilla, Queen of the Desert
- Lucia Field – member of children's group The Wiggles
- Kip Gamblin – actor, best known for his role as 'Scott Hunter' on Home and Away
- Sophie Lowe – AFI Award nominated actress
- Meg Mac – singer and songwriter
- Sarah Murdoch – international model, wife of Lachlan Murdoch (also attended Pittwater House Girls' College)
- Bojana Novakovic – AFI Award winning actress
- Tommaso Parisi – musician and winner of triple j unearthed high
- Mariam Saab – ABC news presenter and journalist
- Damian Smith – ballet dancer
- Josh Quong Tart – television and theatre actor and singer
- Martin Mulholland – sound engineer and a co-host of the popular YouTube series Mighty Car Mods
- Catherine Sutherland – actress, best known as Katherine Hillard the second Pink Ranger in Mighty Morphin Power Rangers, the Pink Zeo Ranger in Power Rangers Zeo and the first Pink Turbo Ranger in Power Rangers Turbo

== See also ==
- List of creative and performing arts high schools in New South Wales
- List of non-government schools in New South Wales
- List of boarding schools in Australia
