= John Henry Carver =

Australian physicist

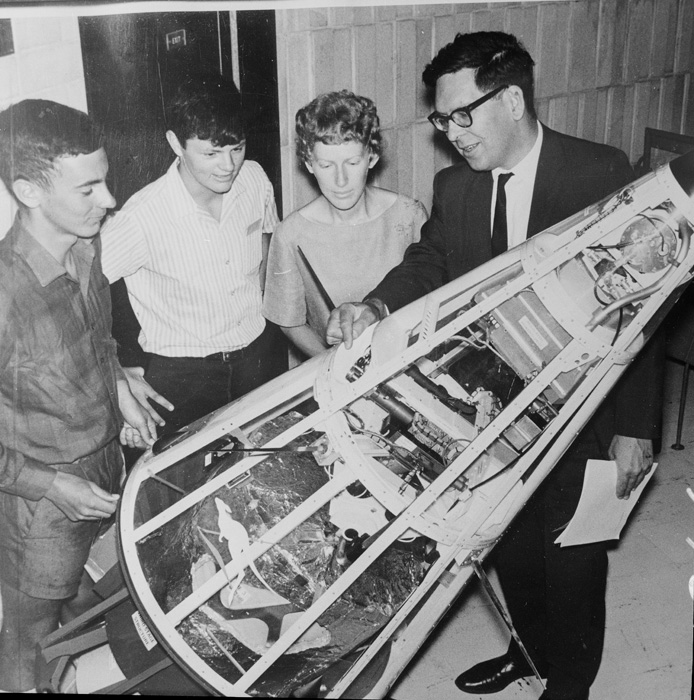
- University of Adelaide Professor John Carver (right), at a summer school of physics
- Born: 5 September 1926; Homebush, New South Wales
- Died: 25 December 2004 (aged 78); Canberra
- Scientific career
- Fields: Physics

John Henry Carver AM (5 September 1926 – 25 December 2004) was an Australian physicist who worked in nuclear and atmospheric physics.

== Education ==
John Carver was educated at Fort Street High School and obtained a first-class honors degree in physics in 1947 from the University of Sydney. On an Australian National University scholarship, he went to Cambridge and obtained a PhD in nuclear physics.

== Career ==
After obtaining a PhD from Cambridge, Carver returned to the Australian National University (ANU) as a Research Fellow in the Department of Nuclear Physics. Eight years later, he won the position of Elder Chair of Physics at the University of Adelaide. This institution was not well equipped for nuclear physics research, and so Carver utilised the proximity of the Weapons Research Establishment and entered the field of atmospheric physics.

Carver was involved in the design and launch of the first Australian-made satellite, which recorded data on the absorption of ultraviolet radiation in the upper atmosphere over a number of years. In 1970 Professor Carver was elected to the chair of the UN Scientific and Technical Sub-Committee on the Peaceful Uses of Outer Space, and he held this position for the next 26 years. In 2000 he was awarded the UN's COSPAR Medal for this outstanding contribution.

In 1978 he returned to the ANU as director of the Research School of Physical Sciences, a position he held until 1992.

== Bibliography ==
- Australian Institute of Physics obituary - John Henry Carver
- Bright Sparcs biography - John Carver
- Australian Academy of Science: Interviews with Australian Scientists - Professor John Carver
