= Homebush, New South Wales =

Homebush
- Suburb
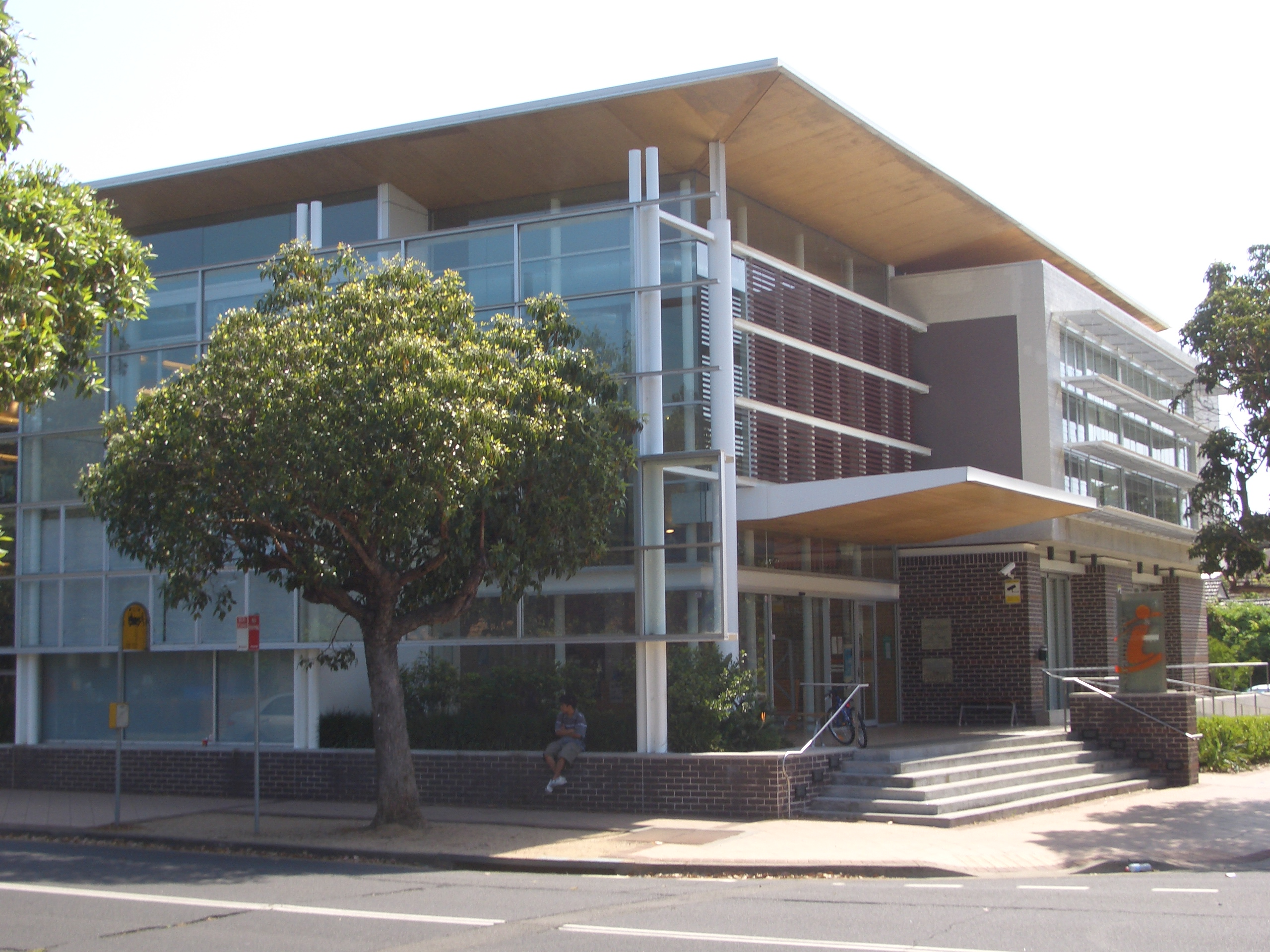
- Library, Rochester Street in 2007

- Interactive map of Homebush
- Country: Australia
- State: New South Wales
- City: Sydney
- LGA: Municipality of Strathfield
- Location: 12 km (7.5 mi) west of Sydney Sydney CBD

Government
  - State electorate: Strathfield Drummoyne
  - Federal division: Reid

Area
  - Total: 2 km^{2} (0.77 sq mi)
- Elevation: 14 m (46 ft)

Population
  - Total: 11,660 (2021 census)
  - Density: 5,800/km^{2} (15,000/sq mi)
- Postcode: 2140
Suburbs around Homebush
Sydney Markets	Sydney Olympic Park	Concord West
Flemington	Homebush	North Strathfield
Strathfield	Strathfield	Strathfield

Homebush is a suburb in the Inner West of Sydney in the state of New South Wales, Australia. It is located 12 kilometres west of the Sydney central business district, in the local government area of the Municipality of Strathfield.

The name of the suburb derives ultimately from an estate to the north, called "Home Bush" and owned by colonial surgeon D'Arcy Wentworth, via the historic Homebush railway station, named after the estate and built in 1855. The present-day suburb of Homebush is bisected by the main suburban railway, Parramatta Road and the M4 Motorway into distinct sections with separate histories of development and present patterns of land use.

South of the railway is the core of the historic "Village of Homebush" estate developed in 1878. This part of the suburb is predominantly low-rise historical homes, with a school, a historic commercial high street and newer mid-rise apartments clustered around the station. It was part of "Strathfield" from 1885 until 1977, and the boundary with Strathfield was further adjusted in 1995.

North of the railway was known as North Homebush in the early 20th century when it experienced industrial and residential development. Homebush Municipal Council was established in 1906 covering the areas of Homebush and Homebush West north of the rail line. It remained a separate municipality until 1947. In the early 21st century, north Homebush has experienced significant population growth due to high density residential developments. The construction of the M4 Motorway in north Homebush led to the demolition of historic homes. Commercial premises now predominate in this area.

A number of geographical names outside the suburb also take their names from the Home Bush Estate. The separate suburb of Flemington was officially gazetted as "Homebush West" in 1992. Homebush Bay (early known as The Flats) is a major inlet on the southern side of the Parramatta River, now surrounded by the separate suburbs of Wentworth Point, Sydney Olympic Park and Rhodes.

== History ==
=== Early history ===
The first name of settlement in the Concord Plains area was "Liberty Plains". This was a group of grants given to the Colony's first free settlers, who came on the ship "Bellona", in 1793. Most of the original settlers soon departed for agriculturally more attractive places, like the Hawkesbury. One of them, Edward Powell, later returned and established there the Half Way House Inn, on Parramatta Road just west of the creek that now bears his name. The Parish of Liberty Plains remains one of the 57 parishes of Cumberland County, New South Wales (the parish is a cadastral unit for use on land titles). That parish covers the suburb of Homebush West (Flemington), but not the suburb of Homebush, which is instead in the Parish of Concord.

=== The Home Bush Estate and the railway ===
When the Great Western Railway line came through there, with a station just behind Powell's Inn, the station borrowed the name "Homebush" from the nearest large estate, that of the "Home Bush Estate", owned by the Colony's then-assistant surgeon, D'Arcy Wentworth. The station was briefly the early terminus of the Great Western Line in 1855. It is commonly thought that this property and house with the name of "Home Bush" was established and named by D'Arcy Wentworth. Historian Michael Jones who had been commissioned by Stathfield Council to write the history of that municipality wrote: "Wentworth is popularly credited with having called the area after his 'home in the bush', although Homebush is also a place in Kent". However, according to local historian David Patrick it was not D'Arcy Wentworth who named "Home Bush" but an earlier grantee on the land – that being the military figure Thomas Laycock.

It would appear that after Laycock became mentally ill, following his direct involvement in suppressing the Castle Hill convict rebellion, D'Arcy Wentworth became his doctor. It has been reputed that D'Arcy Wentworth either bought the Laycock Home Bush Farm from Laycock or, more fancifully, won the property in an unfair game of cards from the ailing Laycock. Wentworth retained Thomas Laycock's name of the property and added to its extent.

Laycock had been granted 40 hectares in 1794 and increased this to 318 hectares (790 acres) by 1803 and named it "Home Bush". A notice that Laycock placed in the newspapers about his property "Home Bush" is from before when Wentworth acquired the land from him. Later on, Wentworth acquired more land there himself and the estate had grown to 400 hectares (990 acres) by 1811. However, the "Home Bush Estate" had only minor overlaps with the present suburb: most of Wentworth's Home Bush Estate (later a race course and paddocks) is located in present-day Olympic Park and Flemington. Most of the former "Home Bush Estate" became a separate suburb of former Auburn Council named "North Lidcombe", and (from 1989) "Homebush Bay", most of which became in 2009 the suburb of Olympic Park in the City of Parramatta, and a smaller part became the suburb of Wentworth Point.

=== "Village of Homebush" and incorporation of Strathfield ===
By contrast, the village and 19th century locality of Homebush was subdivided from Powell's estate, a separate grant to the south. Powell's grant, enlarged in his lifetime, passed eventually to his son-in-law James Underwood in 1823. It was from the "Underwood Estate" that the "Village of Homebush", located south of the railway and west of Powell's Creek, was subdivided in 1878 for residential development, with a small village "high street" forming on Rochester Street adjacent to the railway station. An extended area to the south followed the oblique street pattern of Coventry Road (part of which was renamed Mackenzie Street in 1918) and Beresford Road, such as Albert Road and Oxford Road. The suburb of "Homebush" thus included the northern and central part of today's suburb of Strathfield, bounded by Homebush Road in the east. Near its southern extremity, Bushy Hill Street Estate, Homebush was subdivided in 1880. This estate included the south side of Redmyre Road, Florence Street and Bushy Hill Street (now Albyn Road), to the west of Homebush Road.

The then-locality of Homebush (consisting of the part of today's Homebush and Strathfield south of railway and west of Homebush Road), together with the northern part of Druitt Town (which lay to its south), and the western part of Redmyre (east of Homebush Road) became part of Strathfield Municipality in 1885, after which directories listed houses in all three areas as being in "Strathfield".

=== The new 'Homebush' ===
After 1885, "Homebush" usually referred to the unincorporated part of the Underwood and Wentworth estates located north of the railway. This area remained underdeveloped for many years, and when "Homebush Municipality" was established over this area (Homebush North) in 1906, there were only 90 houses and 548 residents in the municipality. The incorporation of Homebush North and the development of primary and secondary industry nearby led to rapid development in that area. In 1925, the opening of the Homebush Theatre (later a cinema, now disused) on Parramatta Road spurred development of a commercial area along that road, but this area fell into decline in the late 20th century.

Homebush Municipality merged into Strathfield Municipality in 1947. In 1977, the geographical name "North Homebush" was gazetted. The modern suburb of "Homebush", combining former "North Homebush" and the northern part of Strathfield, were gazetted in 1995.

The 2000 Sydney Olympics marked a pivotal moment in North Homebush's history. The closure of the Homebush Abattoir and the NSW Brickworks in the late 1980s paved the way for redevelopment. Sydney's successful bid for the Olympic Games accelerated this transformation, leading to the construction of Olympic venues and the creation of public spaces and parklands. The area, now known as Sydney Olympic Park, was designed to be a lasting legacy of the Games, blending sports facilities with residential and commercial developments.

== Description ==
Homebush is made up of a number of areas that were developed at different times. The modern suburb is bounded roughly by Saleyards Creek in the west and Powells Creek in the north and east. In the northwest, since 1992 it has been divided from the suburb of Sydney Olympic Park in the City of Parramatta by the A3 arterial road; prior to that, the northwest boundary was Boundary Creek. In the south, it is divided from the suburb of Strathfield by an irregular boundary roughly following the local artery road formed by Arthur Street, Broughton Road and Beresford Road, but which brings all of the properties facing that road within the boundaries of the suburb of Strathfield. The boundary has repeatedly changed since 1977, after north Homebush became part of Strathfield Municipality. The Homebush village centre (extending much further south than today's boundary) was first carved out of the suburb of Strathfield, eventually to be combined with north Homebush to form the modern suburb. The southern part of the historical suburb of Homebush (between Broughton Road and Albyn Road) is now part of the suburb of Strathfield. The area to the north of the railway that formed the historical Municipality of Homebush is now in the suburbs of Homebush and Homebush West (Flemington). Small strips to the northwest and northeast are in Sydney Olympic Park and North Strathfield respectively.

=== Homebush South (Homebush Village) ===
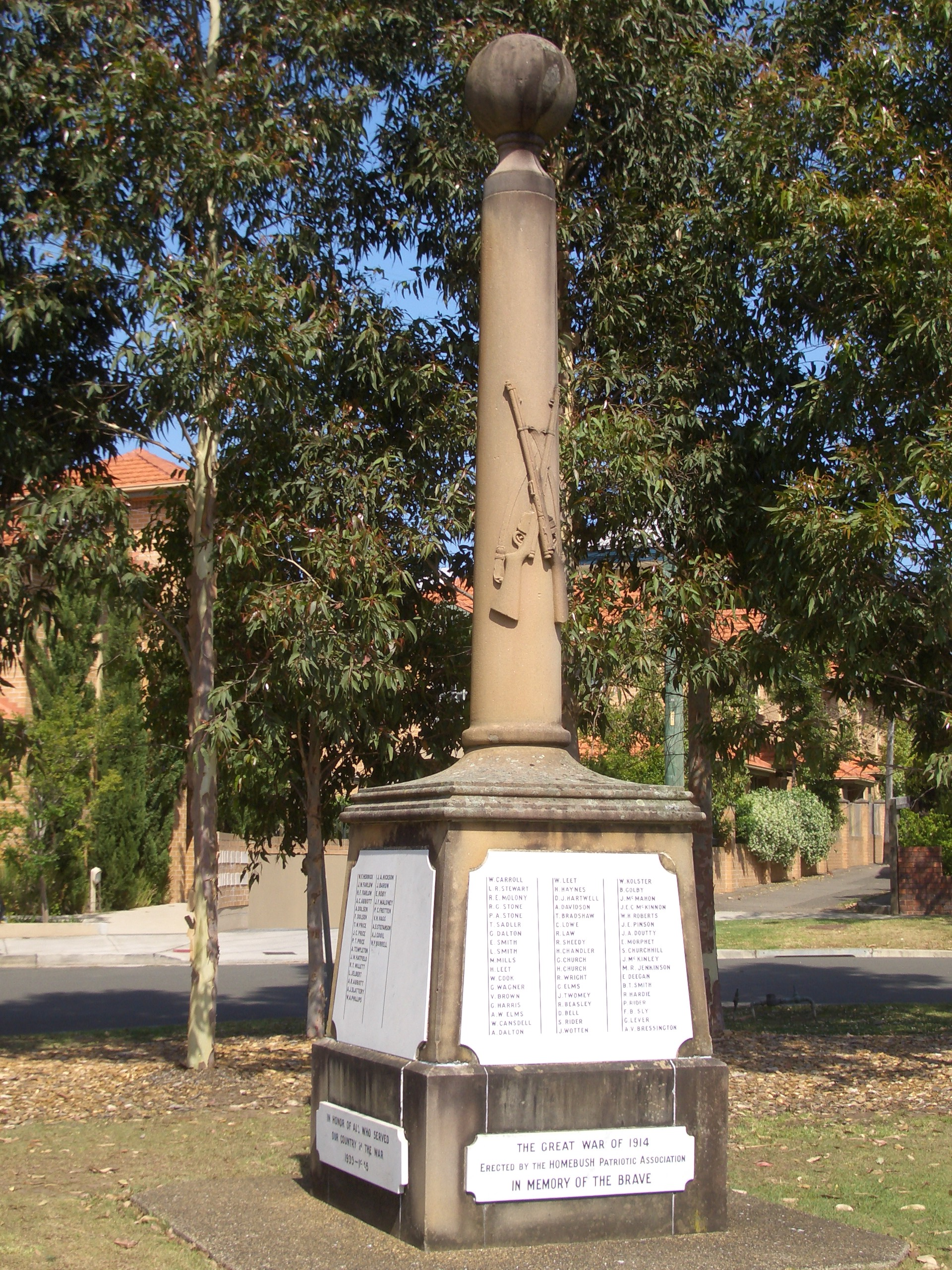
Homebush War Memorial in Davey Square, a small reserve at the intersection of Rochester Street and Beresford Road.

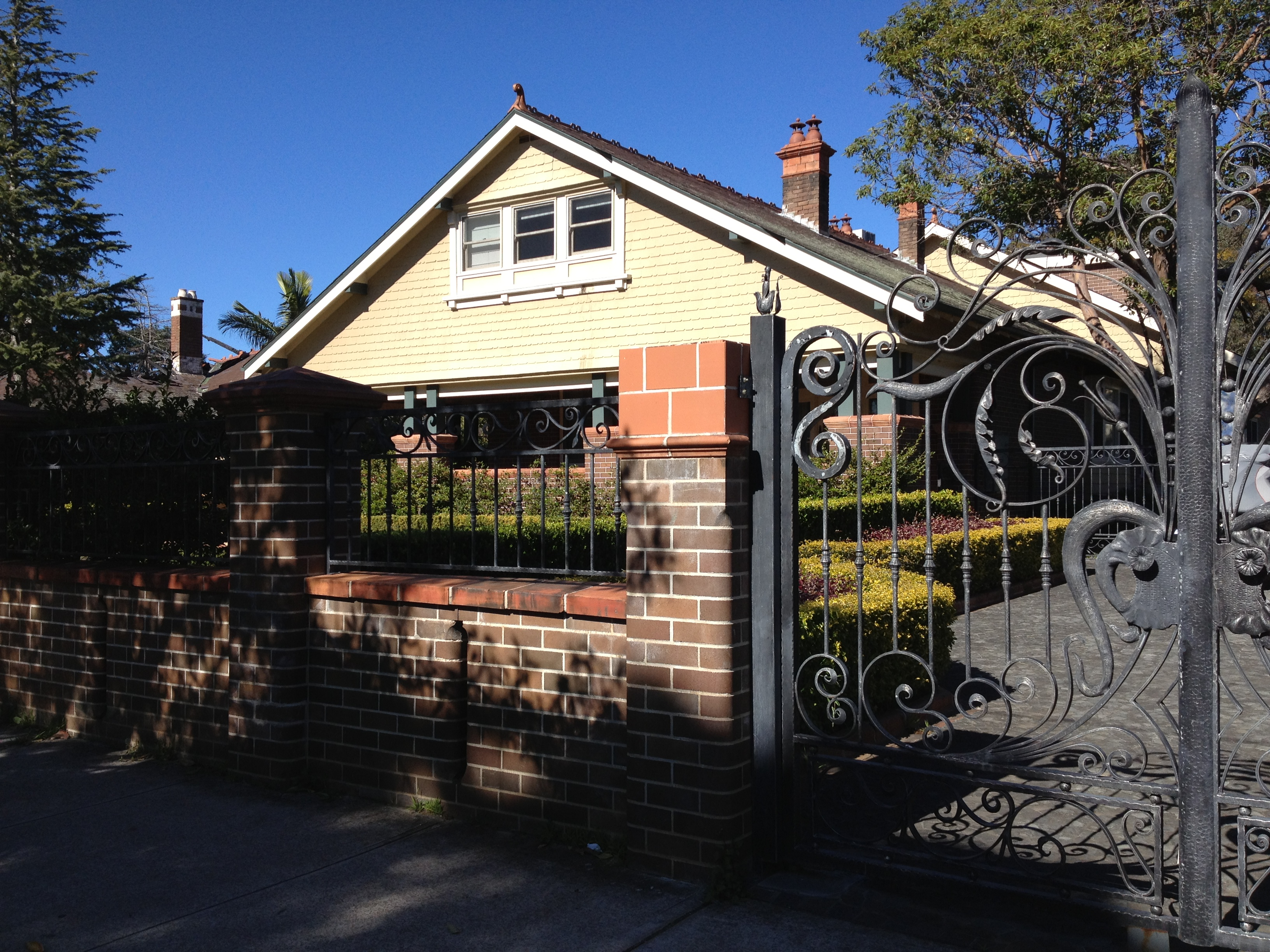
Billesdon Burlington Road

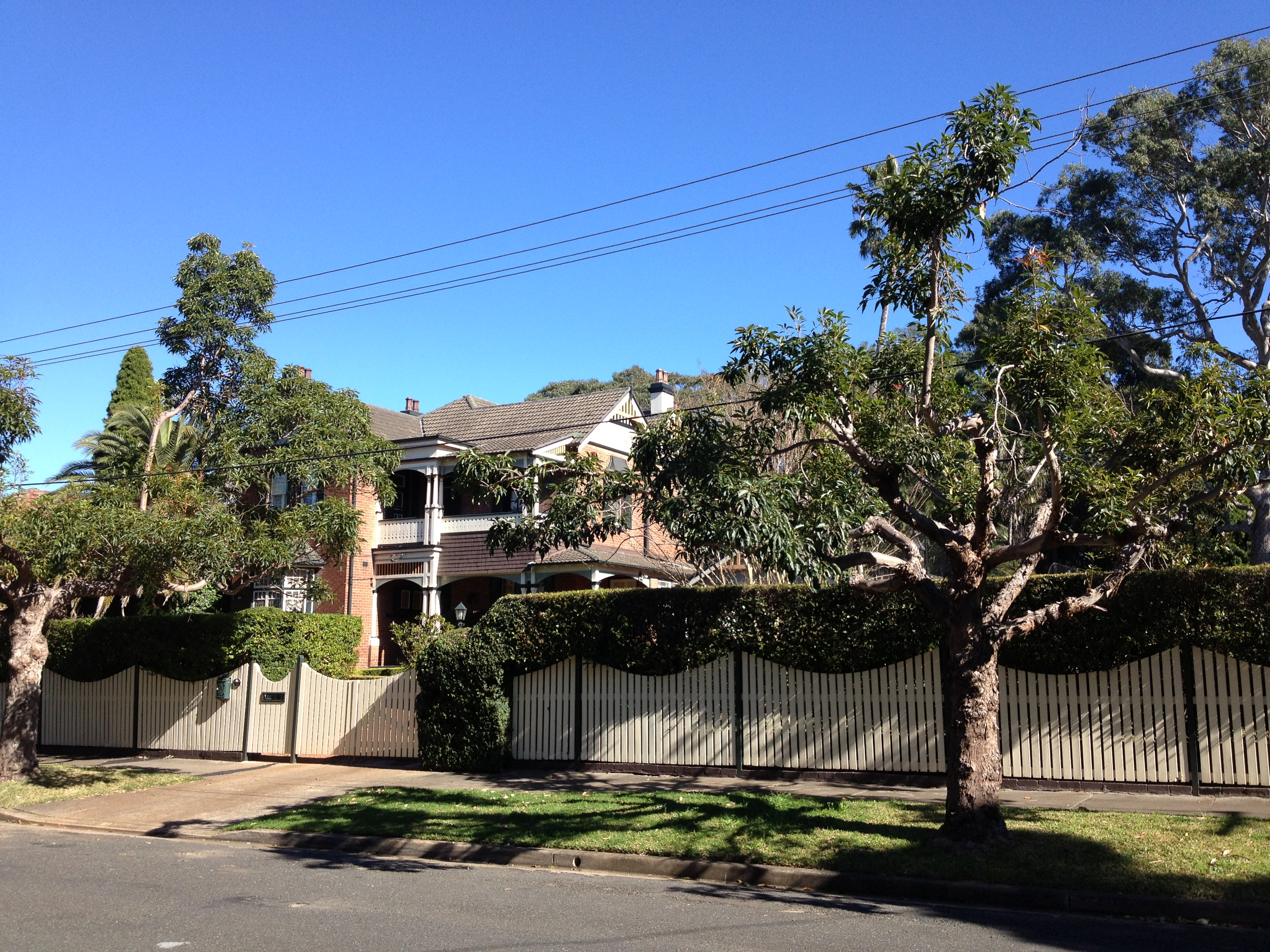
Dunkeld Meredith Street

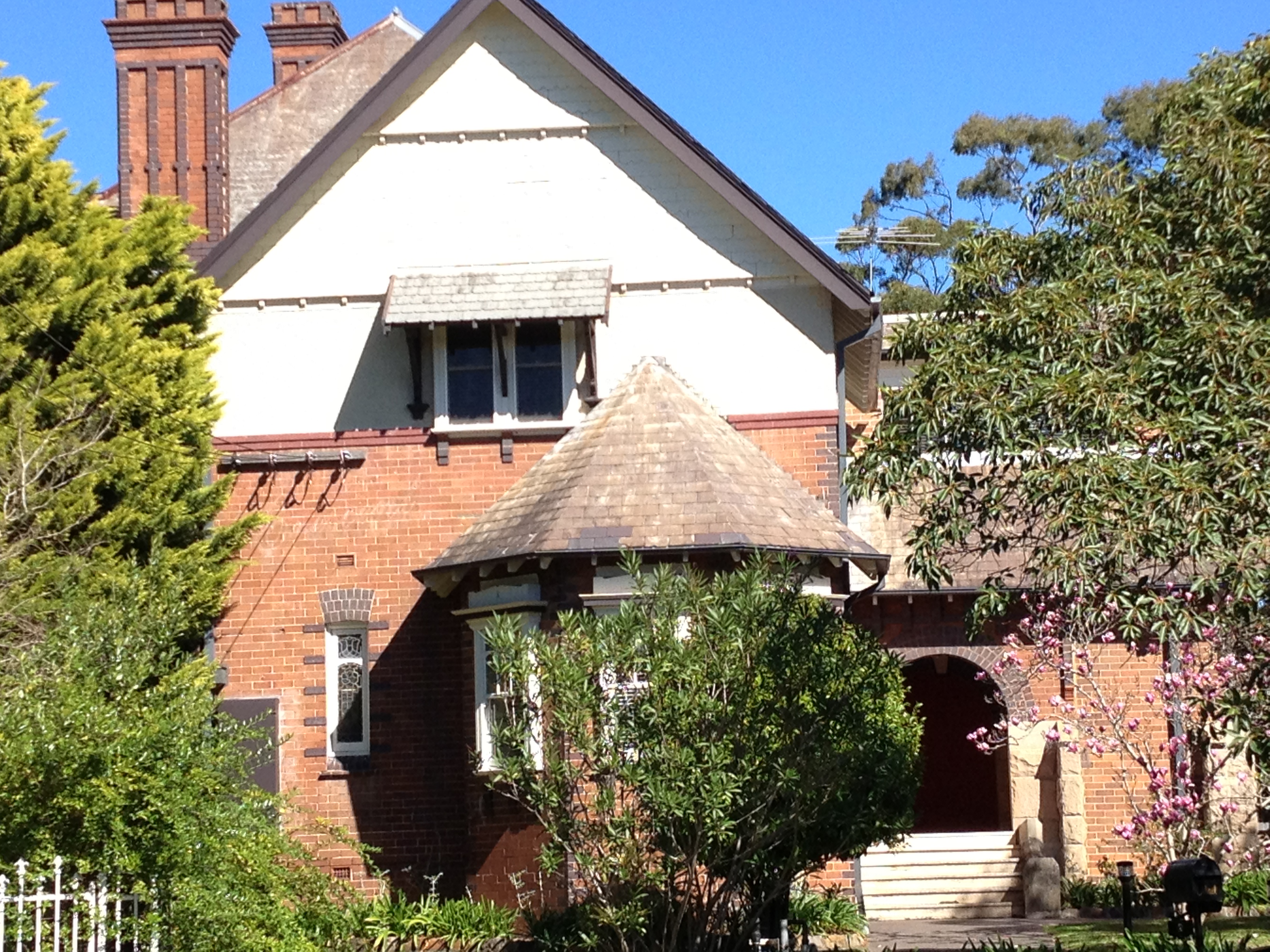
Ingera Abbotsford Road

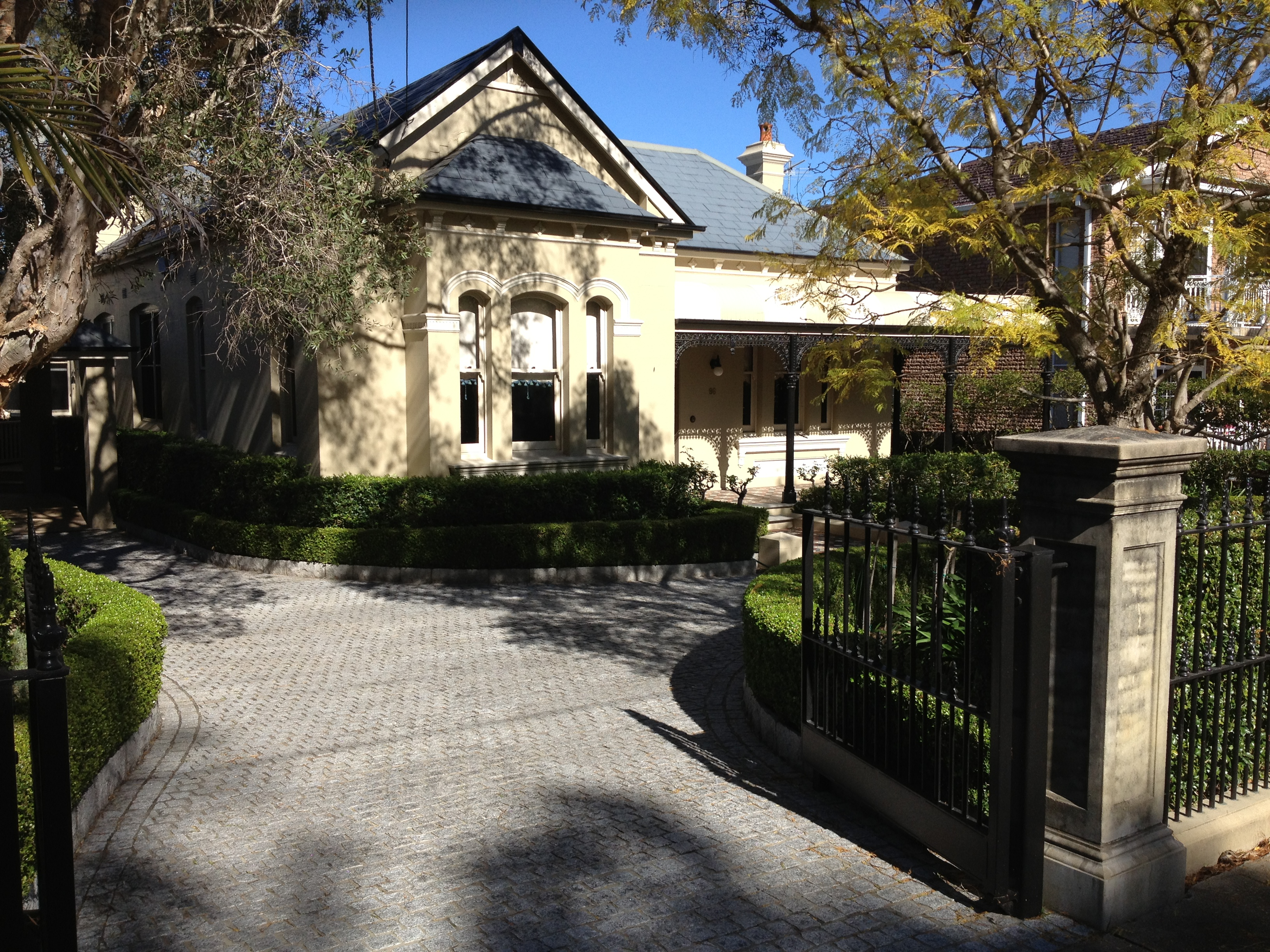
Wellbeck/Warwick Abbotsford Road

Homebush South, also called Homebush Village, is a locality comprising the part of the suburb of Homebush to the south of the railway. Homebush South has a population of 2,806 and a population density of 4,306 people per square kilometre. "Homebush South" was gazetted as a "neighbourhood" in 1992.

Homebush South consists of the bulk of the Village of Homebush estate which was first subdivided in 1878. This development was subdivided from the larger Underwood Estate and is today split between the suburbs of Homebush and Strathfield. The land had boundaries of The Crescent, Homebush, Beresford, Coventry and Bridge Roads. Homebush Village became part of Strathfield Municipality, proclaimed in 1886. Within the estate, Broughton, Abbotsford and Burlington Roads and Rochester and Meredith Streets were also gazetted. In the December of that year, 381 house blocks were auctioned. By the end of the century, many large houses and substantial villas had been built. In the 20th-century house construction continued and most blocks had been built on by the end of the 1920s. Due to boundary changes after North Homebush was incorporated into Strathfield in 1947, the historic "Village of Homebush" estate is today partly in Homebush South and partly in the suburb of Strathfield.

The western boundary of Homebush South is Saleyards Creek, which flows through Airey Park and divides Homebush South from Flemington village, in the suburb of Homebush West. The creek also serves as the boundary between the cadastral units (used for land title purposes) of the Parish of Concord (to the east, including Homebush) and the Parish of Liberty Plains (to the west, including Flemington).

The Homebush Village centre lies on a section of Rochester Street close to the railway, which forms the "high street" of the village. The commercial buildings along the village high street are largely preserved from the 19th century and are protected as a heritage conservation area. Today, the village centre is populated by numerous cafes and restaurants, as well as independent businesses such as a bakery, a flower shop, a newsagency, a butcher, a bank, a post office, a pharmacy, doctors' surgeries and grocery stores. These shops extend to The Crescent, opposite Homebush railway station.

While there are low-to-medium-rise apartment blocks around the village centre, most of Homebush South is made up of freestanding residences. Reflecting the age and well-preserved condition of these residential streets, significant parts of the former Village of Homebush are protected as heritage conservation areas, including almost the entirety of Abbotsford Road, which runs east-west across most of the Village, as well as parts of Meredith Street.

Because the southern part of the village of Homebush is now administratively part of the suburb of Strathfield, various sites previously identified with Homebush are no longer within the boundaries of the suburb. These include the Homebush War Memorial in Davey Square, at the southern tip of the village of Homebush.

Homebush Public School, opened in 1885, is in the village centre. Homebush Boys High School is located on the western edge of Homebush South. A girls' school, Strathfield Girls High School, is located nearby in Strathfield and also serves Homebush South. Strathfield's main library is located on Rochester Street in Homebush South. The Catholic Seminary of the Good Shepherd, a training institution for priests, is also located in Hommebush South.

Homebush South is connected to North Homebush via two road connections: Subway Lane, which passes under the railway line to the west of the station, and Bridge Road, which passes over the railway line further west.

==== Notable or heritage listed houses in the Village of Homebush estate ====
- Billesdon built 1915 for Stephen Rabone to a design by Rupert Minnett.
- Broughlea built c.1881 for Horatio Aylward, a solicitor in the firm of Aylward and Wild.
- Camden Lodge 1917 built as Canlidgy for Robert Trevethan and designed by Alfred Gambier Newman. The house was burnt out on 2012 and in 2023 the front of the house is being restored with James Phillips of Weir and Philips doing the heritage work and Litera Trotta architects designing the new two level rear wing with underground parking.
- Dunkeld (now Edensor) was designed by Joseph Alexander Kethel and was built in 1906 by pastoral agent and tennis player John Peate Duguid (1875–1961). The house was then owned by James Pearce (1857–1916), who was the proprietor of the Strathfield Flour Mills.
- Florenceville built c.1880 by John Shiply
- Hawthorn built c.1886 for Frederick William Binney to a design by Cyril and Arthur Blacket. Binney was Secretary of the Newcastle-Wallsend Coal Company and the Northern Collieries Association.
- Ingera built c.1894 for William Norton
- Rothsay built c.1884 for stockbroker Samuel Thompson (1821–1910)
- Wellbeck built c.1892 for solicitor Albert Nicholson. In 1902 the house became known as Warwick when Emily Forrester (the widow of William Forrester of Warwick Farm) owned the house. Emily Forrester died at Warwick, Homebush, in 1917.

=== North Homebush ===
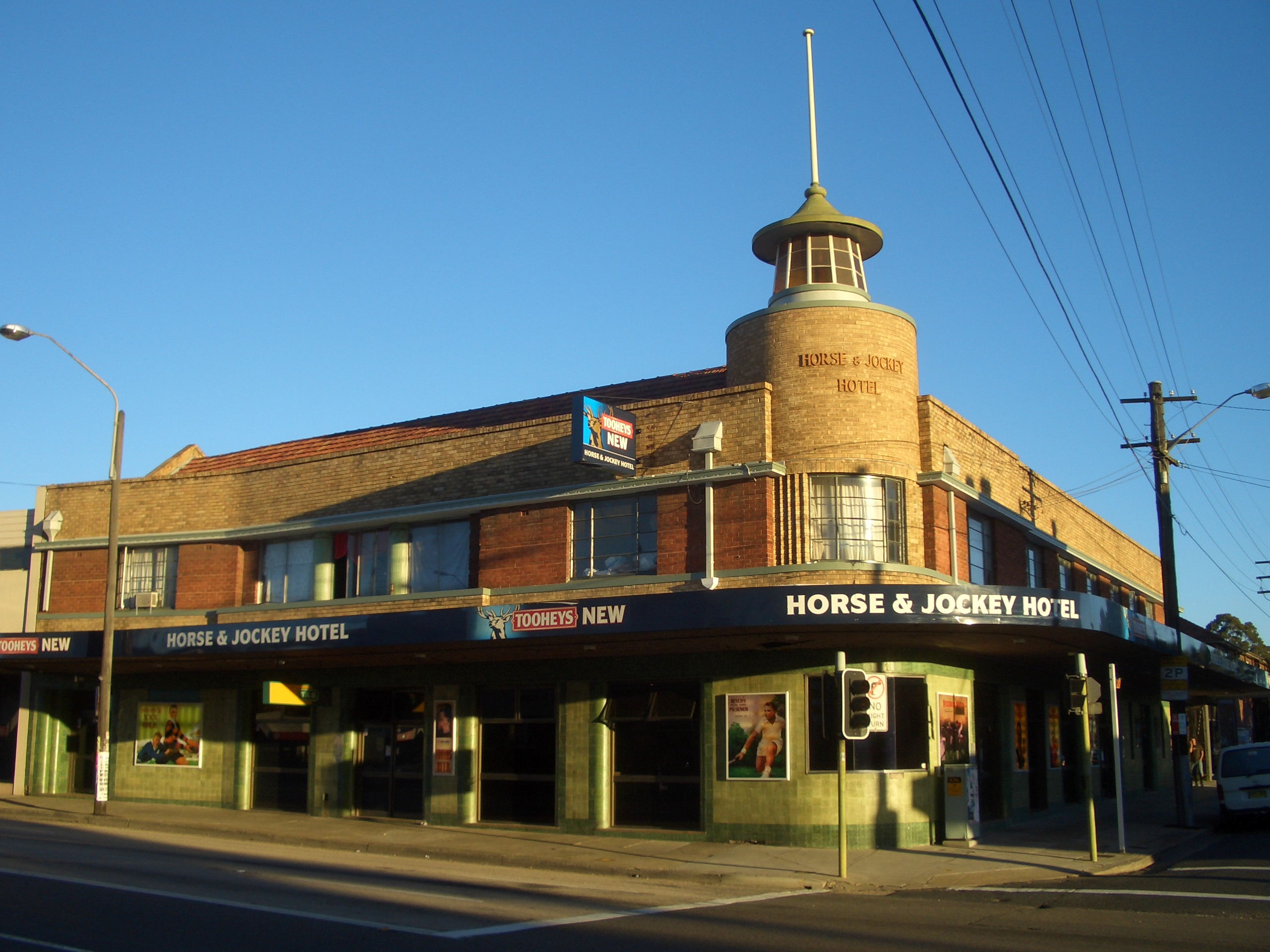
Heritage-listed Horse and Jockey Hotel, Parramatta Road

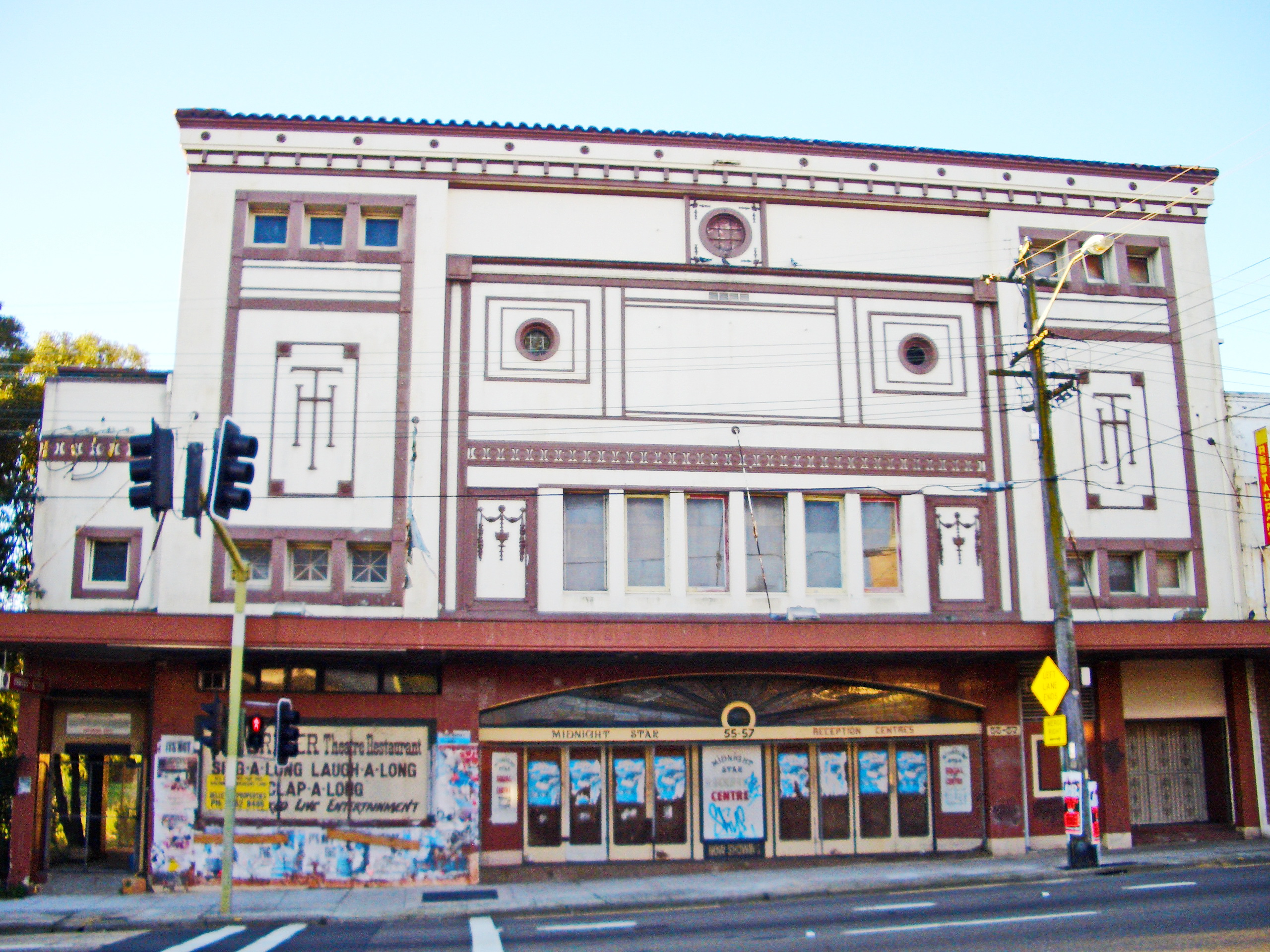
Former cinema, Parramatta Road

North Homebush, the part of Homebush north of the railway, is bisected by Parramatta Road and the M4 Western Motorway. It has a total population of 8,966, of which the vast majority (7,797 people) is concentrated in the area south of the M4 motorway and north of the railway.

Because North Homebush is much better integrated with North Strathfield and Concord West, and Homebush South with Strathfield, than the two halves of Homebush are to each other, government planning documents refer to North Homebush and North Strathfield together, as the "Homebush Precinct". The "Homebush North Precinct" as defined by state government planning documents in fact lies in North Strathfield and Concord West, outside the suburb of Homebush completely.

The North Homebush area was developed slightly later than Homebush South. Although Edward Powell's Half Way House Inn on Parramatta Road had been established early in the life of the colony, the rest of the area was largely used for grazing. In the 1870s, stockyards (for the sale of livestock by auction) were erected adjacent to the station. In 1881, an attempt was made to subdivide the part of the former Home Bush Estate north of Parramatta Road, as the "Homebush Park Estate". However, this and subsequent subdivision proposals were not successful, and other than the lots adjacent to Parramatta Road, most of the land remained unsold and was sparsely populated.

When the NSW Government abattoirs were moved from Glebe to present-day Sydney Olympic Park, the stockyards were closed and replaced by Flemington stockyards, further west, in 1883. Hotels and other businesses were established in the area adjacent to the stockyards, servicing stockyard and abattoir workers.

The removal of the stockyards allowed development of North Homebush to begin, around the turn of the 20th century, with its own local government (the Municipality of Homebush) established in 1906. The area immediately around Parramatta Road became a busy commercial area, serving workers at factories located along Parramatta Road and further to the north, such as the Arnott's Biscuits factory and the EMI records factory, established in the early 20th century. This area was centred on the intersection of Knight Street with Parramatta Road. In 1947, North Homebush became part of the Municipality of Strathfield.

With the decline of industry and the increase of traffic congestion along Parramatta Road after World War II, many of the shops formerly located in the North Homebush commercial area are now shut or abandoned, similarly to other parts of Parramatta Road. Some remnants of the former commercial area remain, including the Horse and Jockey Hotel, a heritage-listed pub on the site of the original Half Way House Inn, as well as the imposing former Homebush Cinema, now abandoned. At least for the time being car sales yards continue to flourish along Parramatta Road but this main artery through North Homebush has now been re-zoned high density residential, with mid- and high-rise apartment blocks proliferating. The only commercial area along Parramatta Road which remains thriving is in the extreme west of this part of the suburb. It is part of Sydney Markets Plaza and serves the Sydney Markets at Flemington.

The construction of the M4 Motorway in the 1970s led to the demolition of some of the fine houses of North Homebush, such as "Pomeroy House".

North of the M4 Western Motorway, the suburb boundaries extend further west to the western bank of Saleyards Creek. A large portion of this area is occupied by former industrial land, now redeveloped into parklands, office parks and the DFO Homebush shopping centre.

Other nearby commercial areas are the 'Bakehouse Quarter' in neighbouring North Strathfield and the Homebush Village centre in Homebush South.

As a postal town (for Australia Post purposes) the name "Homebush" refers only to North Homebush.

There are no schools in North Homebush, but the area is served partly by Homebush Public School and partly by North Strathfield Public School. It is also within the catchment areas of Homebush Boys High School and Strathfield Girls High School.

=== Heritage listings ===
Homebush has a number of heritage-listed sites. This includes the following state heritage listed site:

- Great Southern and Western railway: Homebush railway station.

== Governance ==
Homebush (now Homebush South and part of Strathfield) was one of the three areas that formed the Strathfield Council when it was proclaimed in 1885, the other two being Redmyre and Druitt Town. The part of the modern suburb north of the railway remained unincorporated until Homebush Municipality was established in 1906. Homebush Municipality operated until 1947, when it was amalgamated with Strathfield Municipality.

At state level, the part of Homebush south of the M4 motorway is represented in the Parliament of New South Wales by the seat of Strathfield, while the part north of the M4 is represented by the seat of Drummoyne. Until the 2011 state election, the division line was the railway: North Homebush was in Drummoyne, Homebush South was in Strathfield. For the 2015 and 2019 state elections, both parts of Homebush were in Strathfield.

At federal level, Homebush is in the Division of Reid. Prior to the 2009 redistribution that abolished the Division of Lowe, it was in the Division of Lowe.

== Transport ==
Homebush railway station is serviced by all stations and limited stops services on the Leppington & Inner West Line and Liverpool & Inner West Line of the Sydney Trains network. Homebush South is also served by Strathfield railway station, located a short distance east of the suburb boundary, which provides express services on the North Shore & Western Line, Northern Line, Leppington & Inner West Line and Liverpool & Inner West Line, as well as regional and intercity lines. North Homebush is also served by North Strathfield railway station, located a short distance east of the suburb boundary. North Strathfield is on the Northern Line of the Sydney Trains network. It will also be served by the future Sydney Metro West rapid transit line. Transit Systems buses also service the area.

Parramatta Road (Great Western Highway) and the M4 Motorway are the main arterial roads passing through North Homebush. Underwood Road is a local arterial connecting Parramatta Road with Homebush Bay Drive. Homebush South is accessible from the south via the local arterial Homebush Road, and from the east and west via the local arterial formed by Beresford and Broughton Roads. There are two road connections between North Homebush and Homebush South: the Bridge Road overpass and the Subway Lane underpass.

== Education ==
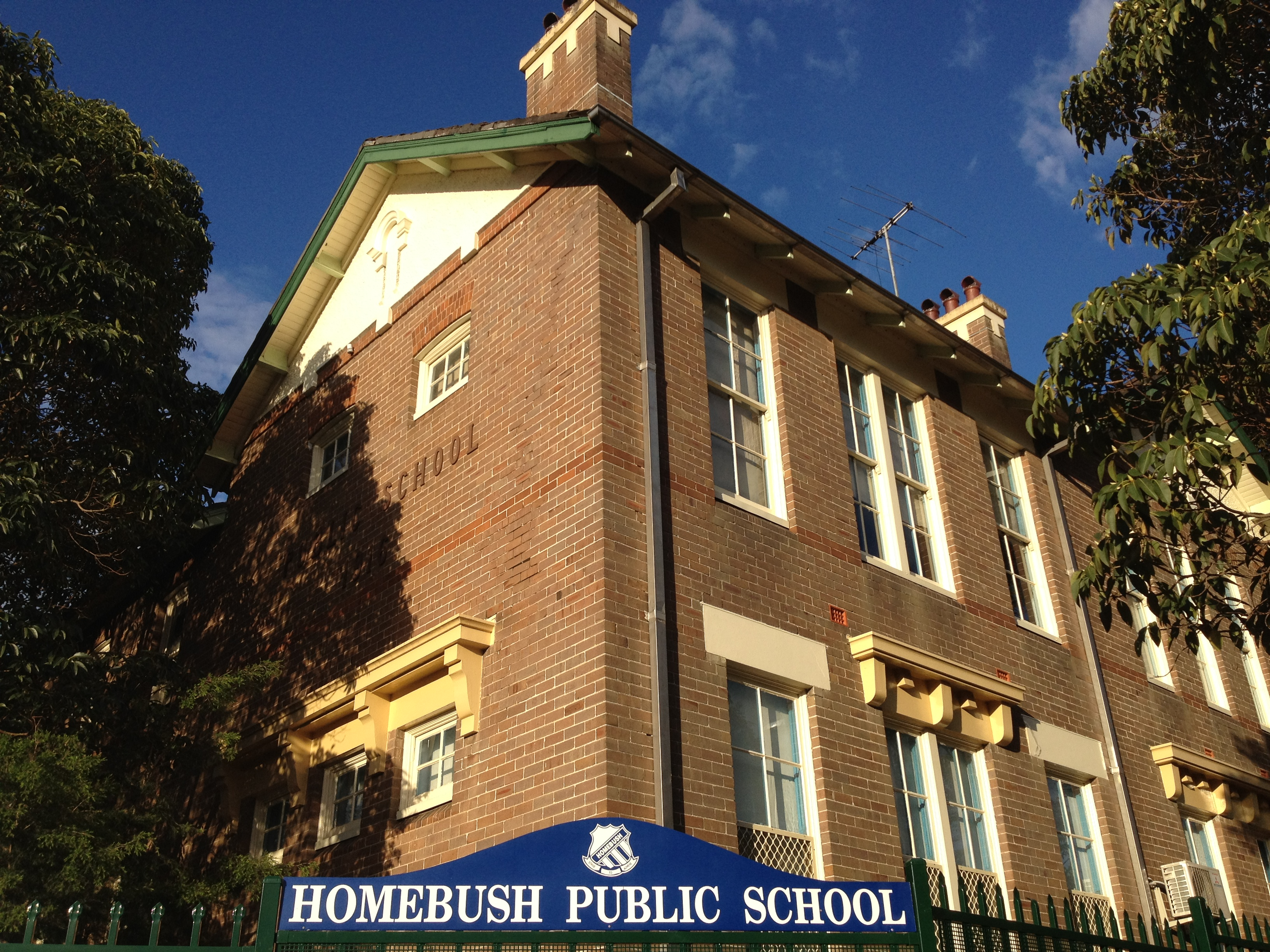
Homebush Public School

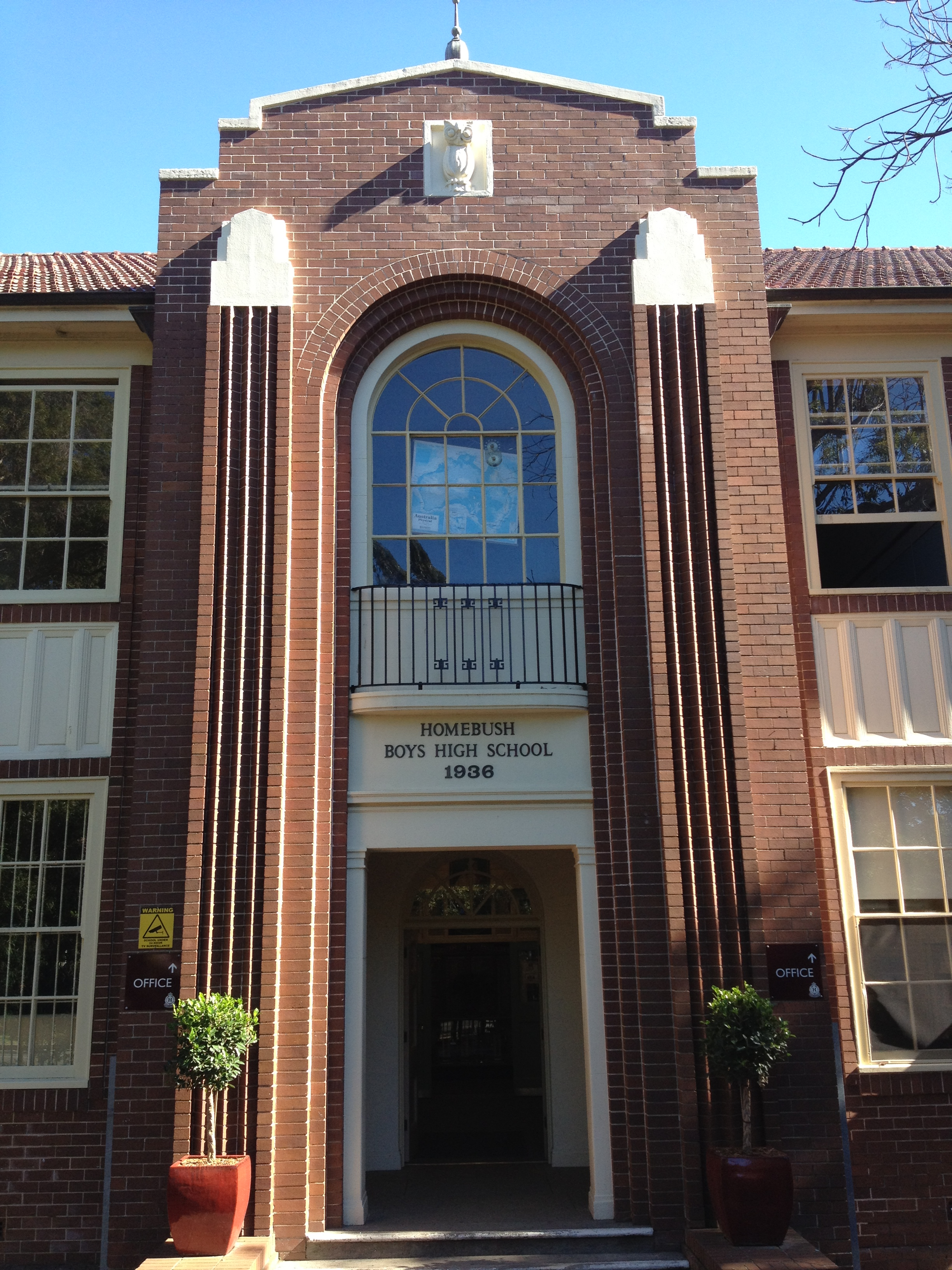
Homebush Boys High School

- Homebush Public School, a government primary school, was established in 1885 on its present site between The Crescent, Rochester Street and Burlington Road. Brick buildings were originally built facing The Crescent in 1897 and Burlington Road in 1916.
- Homebush Boys High School was founded in 1936 and is a comprehensive public high school for boys. Formerly a selective high school until the 1970s, Homebush Boys was regarded as one of the academically best-performing comprehensive schools, and has, in the past, been ranked above selective schools on the Higher School Certificate results. The school has an enrolment of approximately 1200 students and the students and staff are from diverse backgrounds and many of them live outside the area.
- The Seminary of the Good Shepherd is a Catholic seminary located in Homebush.
- From 1888 until 1892 David Joseph Sly operated Eton College in Albyn Road Strathfield, New South Wales then listed as being in Homebush.
- From 1892 until 1914 Homebush Grammar School was an independent non-denominational day school for boys located in Albert Road, Strathfield. At the time Albert Road was listed as being in Homebush.

== Demographics ==
At the 2021 census, there were 11,660 people in Homebush, a significant increase from the 7,007 residents in the 2016 census, reflecting the rapid increase in density in North Homebush. 27.9% of people were born in Australia. The next most common countries of birth were India 19.7%, China 12.6%, South Korea 7.1%, Nepal 5.9% and Sri Lanka 2.7%%. The top responses for ancestry were Chinese (23.1%), Indian (16.5%), English (9.1%), Korean (8.6%) and Australian (6.9%). 25.3% of people only spoke English at home. Other languages spoken at home included Mandarin 13.8%, Korean 8.1%, Tamil 6.6%, Nepali 5.8% and Cantonese 5.6%. The most common responses for religion were No Religion 30.3%, Hinduism 25.1%, Catholic 14.8% and Buddhism 5.8%. Median weekly household income was $2,101, 20.3% higher than the national median.

== Residents ==
The following were either born or have lived at some time in the suburb of Homebush:

- Patricia Carlon, writer
- John Henry Carver, physicist
- Ray Griggs, naval officer
- Greg Haddrick, screenwriter
- May Hollinworth, theatre producer and director
- Billy Hughes, Prime Minister of Australia
- Sir Ronald Irish, tobacco magnate
- Thomas Keneally, writer, author of Homebush Boy: A Memoir (1995)
- Fenella Kernebone, arts presenter
- Richard Killen, politician
- Rosa Angela Kirkcaldie, hospital matron and army nurse
- Chris Lang, politician
- Evan Mander-Jones, educator and United Nations official
- Phyllis Mander-Jones, librarian
- Fred Shaw Mayer, zoologist
- James McGirr, Premier of New South Wales
- Charles Meredith, colonial politician in Tasmania
- Louisa Anne Meredith, writer and illustrator
- Michael Quinn, politician
- Warren R Rodwell, former soldier, university teacher, hostage survivor and lyricist
- Don Talbot, national swimming coach and sports administrator
- D'Arcy Wentworth, surgeon

== Gallery ==
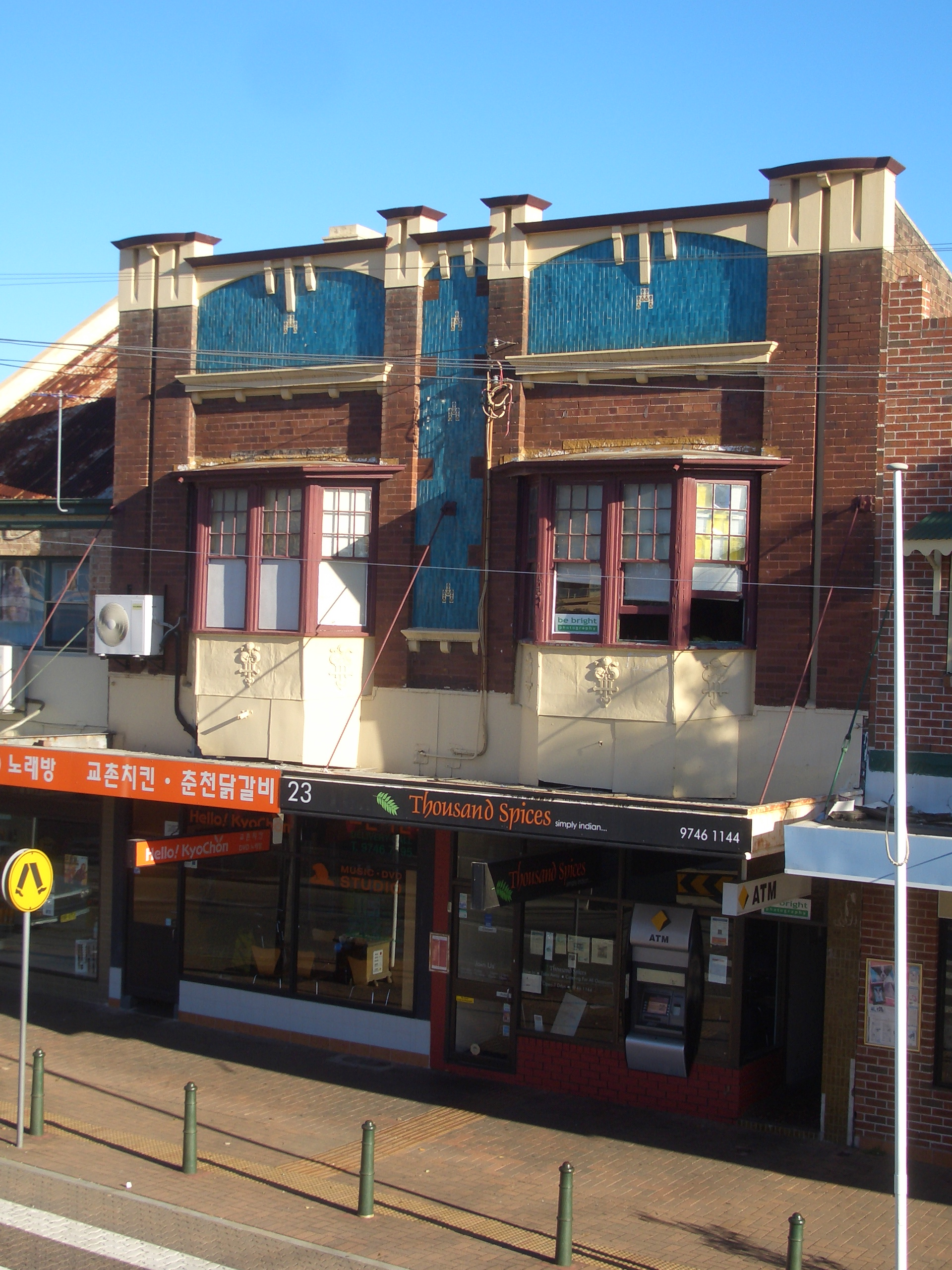
Shops, The Crescent

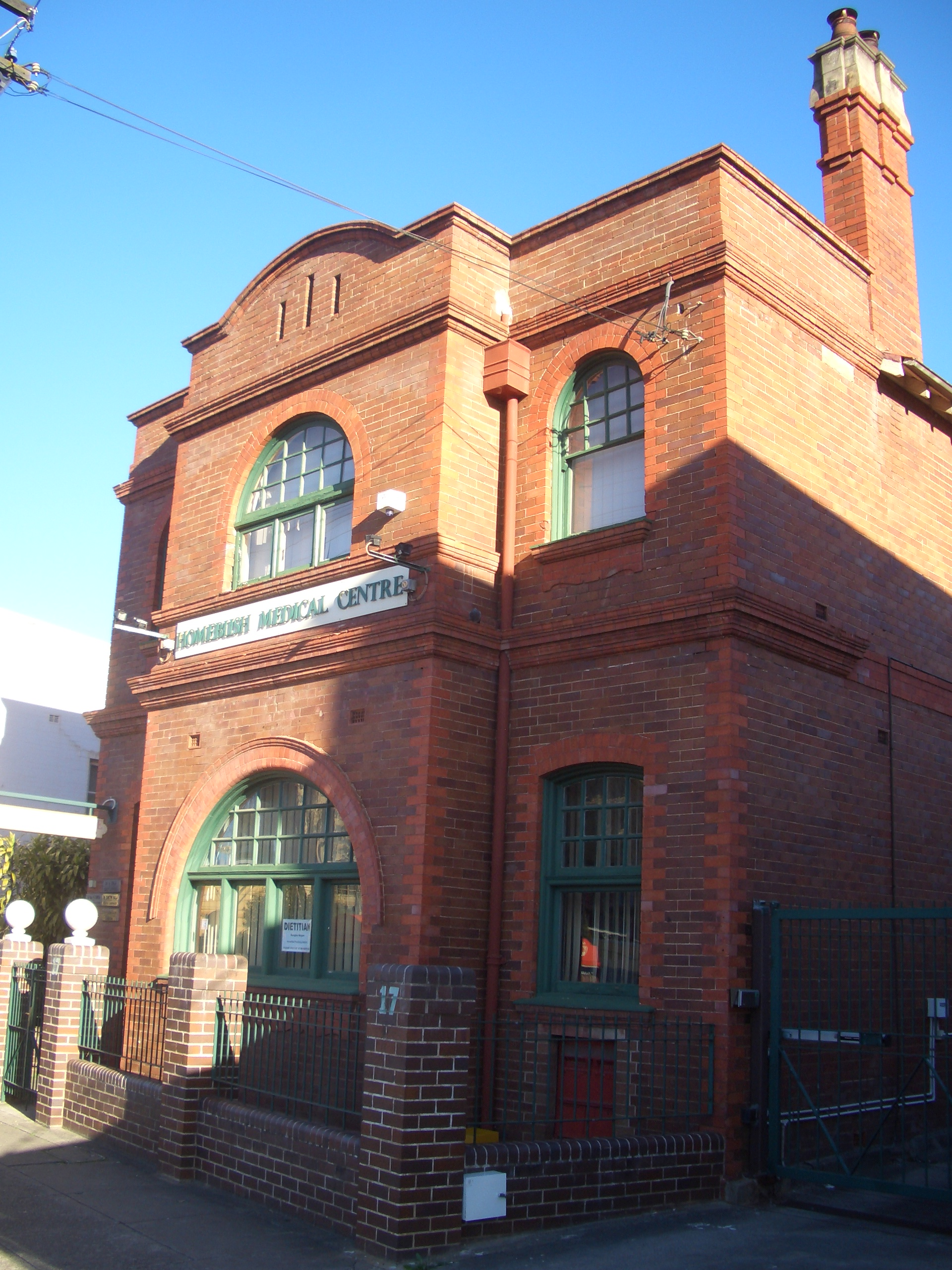
Former Homebush Post Office, The Crescent
