= Mariam Saab =

Lebanese-Australian journalist and television presenter

Mariam Saab is a Lebanese-Australian journalist and television presenter. Saab is a news presenter on ABC News.

== Background ==
Saab was born in Sydney, New South Wales, in a Lebanese-Australian family. She grew up in the Sutherland Shire and attended Illawong Public Primary School followed by The McDonald College performing arts high school.

Her mother, Majida Abboud-Saab, migrated to Australia from Beirut in 1967 aboard RHMS Patris and became a prominent Arabic-language broadcast journalist. A former SBS Arabic language executive producer, Abboud-Saab is widely regarded as having put the world's first dedicated multicultural public television channel to air.

== Career ==
In 2004, Saab began her career at SBS Radio as a broadcaster for Alchemy, the station's national youth news, current affairs and music program.

During a stint in the Middle East, Saab was a journalist for the Lebanese Daily Star newspaper. Her work included coverage of continued poverty in the country, and was reported in policy briefings. During this period, Saab also worked as a freelance producer for Al Jazeera English, France 24, SBS TV and the Australian Broadcasting Corporation (ABC) with assignments in Doha, Tunisia, Beirut and Paris.

Saab was one of the organisers of the Beirut Music and Art Festival, featuring 200 local and international artists, including headliners Sister Sledge, Roger Hodgson and Earth Wind and Fire.

From around 2014 to 2018, Saab lived in Paris, where she was an English-language news and programs presenter for France 24, a global French-government-owned TV channel. She covered the November 2015 Paris attacks and their aftermath. She also frequently appeared as a music critic for France 24's Arts program, Encore, reporting on music trends from destinations including Tripoli and Beirut, and interviewed high-profile artists and entertainers including Australian music icon Paul Kelly.

Since 2019, Saab has presented for Australia's national ABC News channel, appearing as an evening news anchor. She covered the worst of the 2019–20 Australian bushfire season. Her work has also appeared on various ABC digital platforms.

== In the media ==
In September 2020, Saab featured in the Australian edition of Marie Claire, commenting alongside a diverse group of high-profile Australians about their hopes and dreams for the Australian nation and its growing need for change when it comes to much of the country's cultural, social and environmental framework.

In the December 2020 edition of Australian Marie Claire, Saab featured alongside her husband and their two children in a portfolio of candid moments honouring the COVID-19 pandemic year that was, and joining in celebration of family, high fashion and frills fit for the festive season.

== Personal ==
Saab is married to Franco-Lebanese musician Rami Khalifé. The couple met when she interviewed him for SBS broadcasting during a music tour in Australia in 2009.

Saab is praised for her fashion sense on screen.
