= Rami Khalifé =

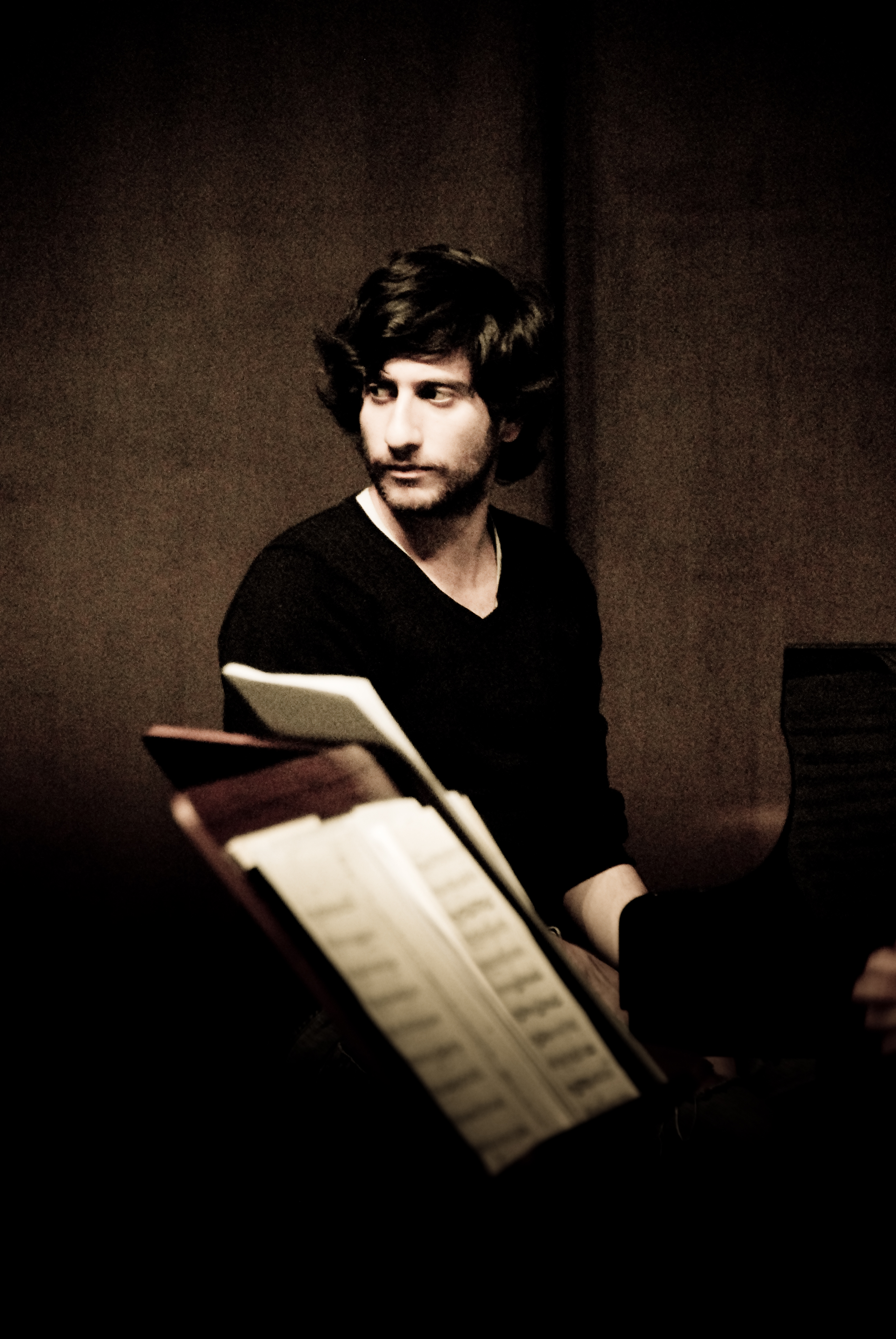

Background information
- Born: September 25, 1981 (age 45); Beirut, Lebanon
- Origin: Paris, France
- Occupations: Composer; Pianist
- Instrument: Piano
- Years active: 1995–present
- Spouse: Mariam Saab
- Website: rami-khalife.com

Rami Khalifé (born September 25, 1981) is a French-Lebanese composer and pianist.

== Early life and education ==
Khalifé was born in Beirut, Lebanon, into a family of musicians. His father is musician Marcel Khalifé and his mother is vocalist Yolla Khalifé. His brother is the percussionist Bachar Mar-Khalifé. Khalifé lived in Beirut until the age of eight when his family moved to Paris as part of a large wave of Lebanese people emigrating to France during the Lebanese Civil War. He eventually got French citizenship.

In Paris, Khalifé attended the Conservatoire National de Région de Boulogne-Billancourt where he studied piano with Louis-Claude Thirion and Marie-Paule Siruguet, and later with Lebanese pianist Abd El Rahman El Bacha. Khalifé was awarded first place on piano and a degree in music theory.

In 2000, Khalifé moved to New York City to study piano with Hungarian pianist Gyorgy Sandor at the Juilliard School of Music. He graduated in 2003.

== Career ==
In Paris before college, Khalifé won piano competitions at Radio France, at the UFAM Competition, and at the Claude Kahn International Piano Competition. In 1994, he performed at the Gaveau Music Hall. He toured the Middle East with the Boulogne-Billancourt Orchestra, where he performed the Rachmaninov piano concerto No. 4 and Ravel's piano concerto in G.

Khalifé has performed in the Middle East and the United States as a solo artist as well as with clarinetist Kinan Azmeh, often playing classical works as well as improvised compositions.

Khalifé performed in Brazil with Brazilian cellist Fabio Presgrave.

While at Juilliard, Khalifé met pianist Francesco Tristano. They performed several improvised concerts for piano-duo and began what would be a long-term creative collaboration. Khalifé also performed improvised concerts for two pianos at Juilliard with pianist Francesco Schlimé.

Khalifé has released multiple live and studio records as a solo artist. In 2002, Khalifé released his first record, a double record called Live in Beirut, which was reinterpretations of traditional classical music pieces. In 2005, he released his second record, Scene from Hellek, which consisted of original compositions.

In 2006, Khalifé performed at the University of Michigan's Hill Auditorium as part of the Arab World Music Summit.

In 2007, Khalifé released a record called Piano Concertos which was Piano Concerto No. 5 by Sergei Prokofiev and Piano Concerto No. 1 by Lebanese-Russian composer Abdalla El-Masri.

In 2013, Khalifé performed original music inspired by the Arab Spring called Requiem for Beirut at the Qatar Philharmonic Orchestra and the MDR Leipzig Radio Choir. In 2015, he performed the work at an outdoor concert at Martyrs' Square in Beirut.

In 2016, Khalifé performed his composition Stories for piano and orchestra with the Chamber Orchestra of Philadelphia.

In May 2017, he performed his work, Voyage with Marcel Khalifé at the Philharmonie de Paris with his father and at the Orchestre national d'Île-de-France, conducted by Julien Leroy.

In 2018, Khalifé released his fifth solo record, an almost completely instrumental work called Lost.

=== Aufgang ===
In 2005, Khalifé founded the classic electronic group Aufgang, initially as a modern experimental music piano duo with Francesco Schlimé aided by digitized music. Aufgang then became a three person project with Khalifé, Francesco Tristano, and Aymeric Westrich, with a record deal with the French label InFiné. They broke out at the 2005 Sonar Festival in Barcelona.

=== Marcel, Rami and Bachar Khalifé ===
In 2011, Khalifé began a new project with his father and brother called "Marcel, Rami & Bachar Khalifé". They debuted at the Beirut Music & Art Festival and was broadcast on MTV. The group was made up of Marcel Khalifé on oud with son Rami Khalifé on piano and son Bachar Khalifé on percussion – with Gilbert Yammine on qanun.

In 2016, the group released a collaborative record called Andalusia of Love, a mixture of traditional music inspired by the Palestinian writer Mahmoud Darwish and improvised compositions from Rami and Bachar. They toured the United States under the sponsorship of American-Arab Anti-Discrimination Committee, making their United States debut at Town Hall in New York City.

== Personal life ==
Khalifé lives in Paris with his wife, ABC Broadcast Journalist Mariam Saab and their two children.

== Discography ==
=== Solo records ===
- 2002: Live in Beirut (Nagam Records)
- 2005: Scene from Hellek (Nagam Records)
- 2007: Piano Concertos (Nagam Records)
- 2008: Pop Art: Francesco Tristano Piano Duet Rami Khalifé (Nagam Records) – with Francesco Tristano
- 2009: Chaos (Nagam Records)
- 2016: Stories (Nagam Records)
- 2018: Lost (Nagam Records)
- 2019: Requiem for Beirut (Live) featuring Whalran Seo, Michalis Economou, Qatar Philharmonic Orchestra & Leipzig MDR Choir

=== Aufgang ===
- "Ellenroutir (Remixes)" (InFiné)
- "Kyrie (Remixes)" (InFiné)
- "Barock Remixes" (InFiné)
- 2009: "Channel 7 Remixes" 12" single EP with 20th Floor Remix By Cubenx and You And Me Remix By John Talabot (InFiné)
- 2000: "Sonar" 12" single (InFiné)
- 2010: Air on Fire EP (InFiné)
- 2010: Dulceria EP (InFiné)
- 2010: Aufgang, self-titled (InFiné)
- 2013: Istiklaliya (InFiné)
- 2016: Turbulences (InFiné)

=== Marcel, Rami and Bachar Khalifé ===
- 2016: Andalusia of Love

=== Selected collaborations ===
- 2002: Música Do Campus: Música Brasileira Para Violoncelo E Piano (Universidade Federal Do Rio Grande Do Norte/Petrobras) – piano
- 2002: Concerto Al Andalus / كونشرتو الأندلس by Marcel Khalifé (Nagam Records)
- 2004: Caress / مداعبة by Marcel Khalifé (Nagam Records)
- 2005: Ne Retiens Pas Tes Larmes / À Mon Amour... by Amel Bent single (Jive/Epic) – piano
- 2006: The Green Armchair (Agoria)
- 2007: Not for Piano by Francesco Tristano (InFiné) – piano
- 2008: Damascus Festival Chamber Players
- 2010: Oil Slick by Bachar Mar-Khalifé
- 2011: Aah by Yolla Khalifé

== Filmography ==
- 2016: Aufgang: Summer (video short) – Composer
