= North Strathfield =

- Suburb
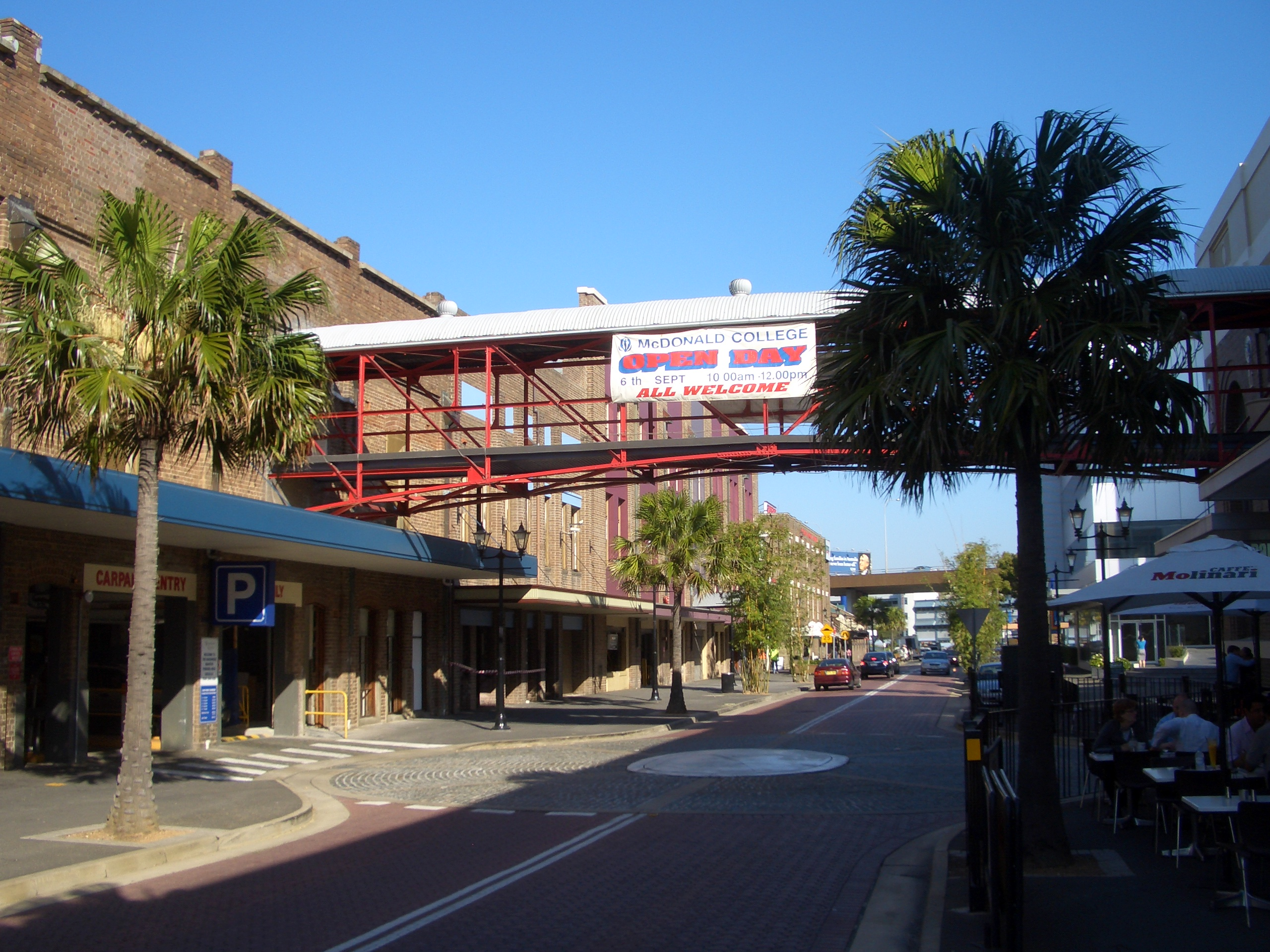
- Bakehouse Quarter

- Interactive map of North Strathfield
- Country: Australia
- State: New South Wales
- City: Sydney
- LGA: City of Canada Bay
- Location: 11 km (6.8 mi) west of Sydney CBD

Government
  - State electorates: Drummoyne; Strathfield
  - Federal division: Reid
- Elevation: 22 m (72 ft)

Population
  - Total: 4,618 (2021 census)
- Postcode: 2137
Suburbs around North Strathfield
Sydney Olympic Park	Liberty Grove	Concord West
Homebush	North Strathfield	Concord
Homebush	Strathfield	Strathfield

North Strathfield is a suburb in the inner-west of Sydney, in the state of New South Wales, Australia. North Strathfield is located 15 kilometres west of the Sydney central business district, in the local government area of the City of Canada Bay. Strathfield and Strathfield South are separate suburbs, to the south.

== History ==
The western part of this suburb was originally part of Homebush, while the eastern part was part of Concord.

The area became part of the Municipality of Concord when the latter was established in 1883. The name "North Strathfield" came from the station, built in 1918. Although the station was in the western part of Concord, there was already a station further north called "Concord West", so the station took its name from neighbouring Strathfield to the south. Strathfield was the name of one of the large homes in the present-day suburb of Strathfield, which in turn was originally named "Stratfield Saye", after the estate of the Duke of Wellington in England.

A major landmark in the area is Ardill House (or Our Children's Home) in Davidson Avenue, which was built by in 1861 John Bibb for Henry David Bray. It was enlarged circa 1880 and is now on the Register of the National Estate.

Because it was bisected by the Main North railway line, with easy access to the major arterial road Parramatta Road as well as to Parramatta River, the area became largely industrial in the early 20th century. Arnott's Biscuits moved its factory to Homebush in 1908. Centred on George Street with direct access to the railway, the factory expanded over time and eventually covered a large portion of the present-day suburb of North Strathfield. The railway bridge immediately south of the Arnott's Factory site is a well known landmark and has carried an advertisement for Arnott's since the 1930s, and is state heritage listed.

With industry moving out in the late 20th century, the area has been gentrified and became largely residential. The Arnott's factory moved out in 1997, with the former factory site redeveloped into the "Bakehouse Quarter" retail and restaurant complex, although its corporate headquarters remains on George Street in the suburb. More recently, many high density residential developments have replaced former industrial sites.

In 2000, the Municipality of Concord merged with Drummoyne Council to become the City of Canada Bay Council.

The suburb name of "North Strathfield" was gazetted in 1993, joining together the northeastern part of Homebush and the southwestern part of Concord and giving the area its own identity as a separate suburb. The suburb name remains seldom used, with many places in the suburb still identified as being in "Homebush" (western part) or "Concord" (eastern part) in common parlance and even in some official sources. Because North Strathfield is much better integrated with the northern part of Homebush than the two halves of Homebush are to each other, government planning documents refer to North Homebush and North Strathfield together, as the "Homebush Precinct", and Canada Bay Council in particular refers to a section of this precinct as the "Homebush North Precinct", even though no part of that section lies in the suburb of Homebush.

In the 21st century, North Strathfield experienced substantial urban renewal, particularly with the redevelopment of the former industrial precinct into the Bakehouse Quarter. The area now features a mix of residential apartments, commercial spaces, and recreational facilities, contributing to the suburb's vibrant community atmosphere. North Strathfield railway station underwent a significant upgrade in 2019, enhancing accessibility with the addition of new lifts, modern amenities and improved security features, all while preserving the site's heritage character.

== Population ==
In the 2021 Census, there were 4,618 people in North Strathfield. 45.0% of people were born in Australia. The next most common countries of birth were China 9.0%, India 6.2%, South Korea 6.1%, Nepal 3.1% and Philippines 2.9%. The most common ancestries reported were Chinese 21.0%, Australian 14.9%, English 12.3%, Italian 8.2% and Korean 7.6%. 43.6% of people spoke only English at home. Other languages spoken at home included Mandarin 9.7%, Korean 7.0%, Cantonese 6.2%, Nepali 3.1% and Italian 3.0%. The most common responses for religion were No Religion 31.2% and Catholic 26.7%.

== Commercial area ==
North Strathfield has residential, commercial and industrial developments. A small group of restaurants and cafes is located opposite the North Strathfield railway station. More commercial developments can be found on nearby Concord Road in the "North Strathfield Shopping Village".

The site of the former Arnott's Biscuits factory in George Street has been redeveloped as the 'Bakehouse Quarter' and feature office space, restaurants, cafes, supermarkets and shops. Arnott's corporate headquarters remains at the Bakehouse Quarter on George Street. The head office and main call centre of NRMA Motoring and Services is also located in the former factory.

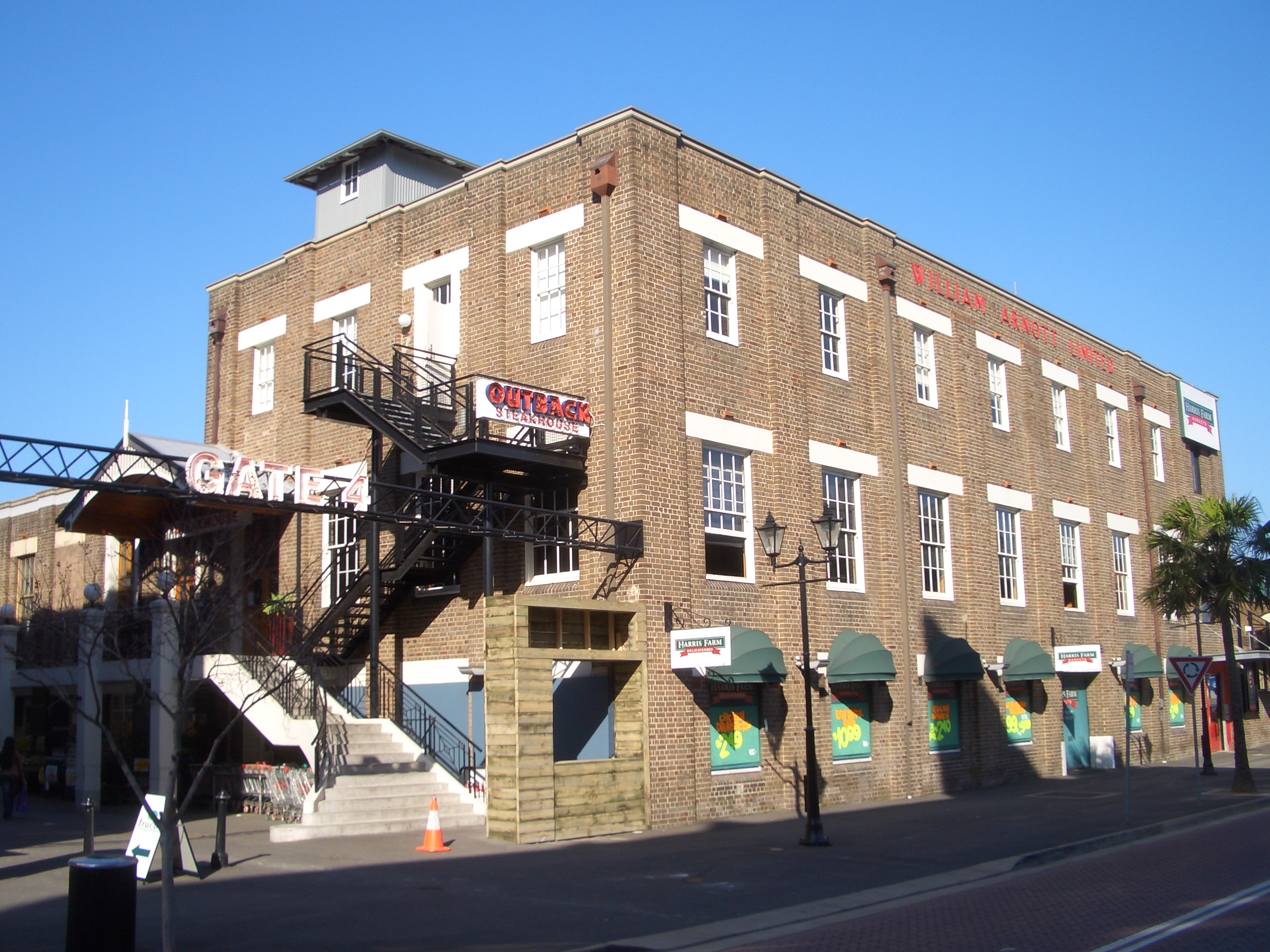
Bakehouse Quarter, former Arnotts factory

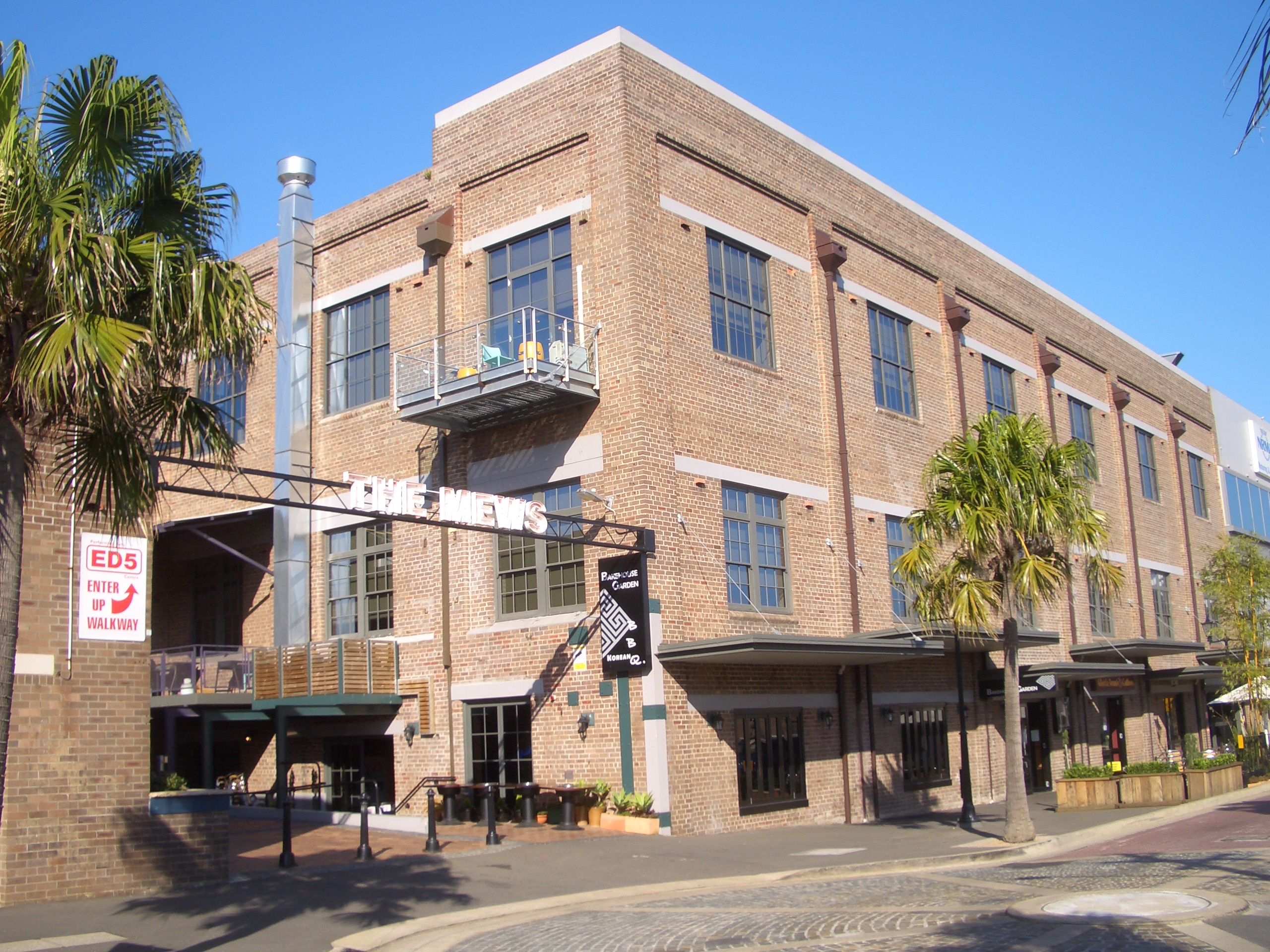
Bakehouse Quarter

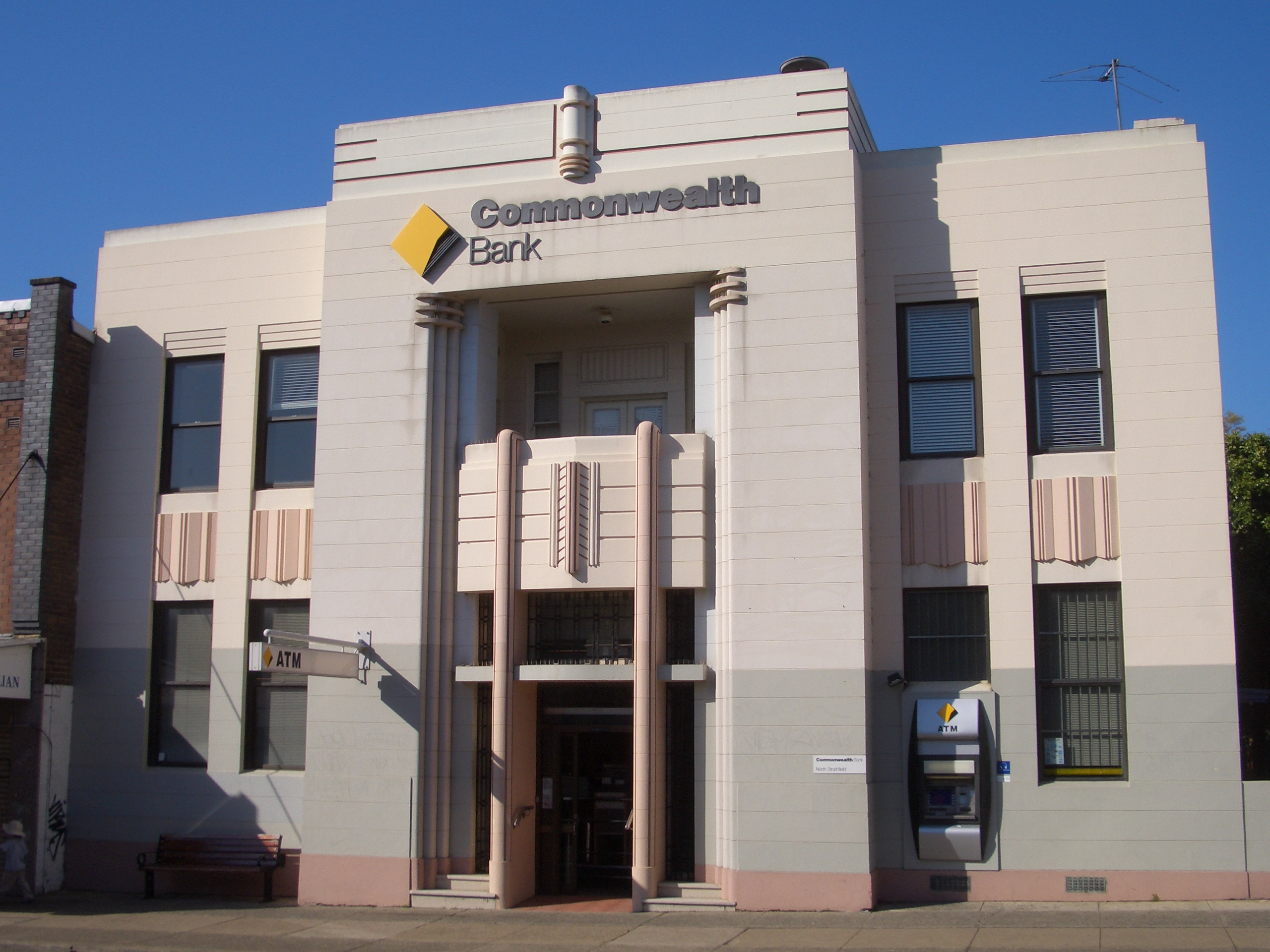
Commonwealth Bank, Concord Road

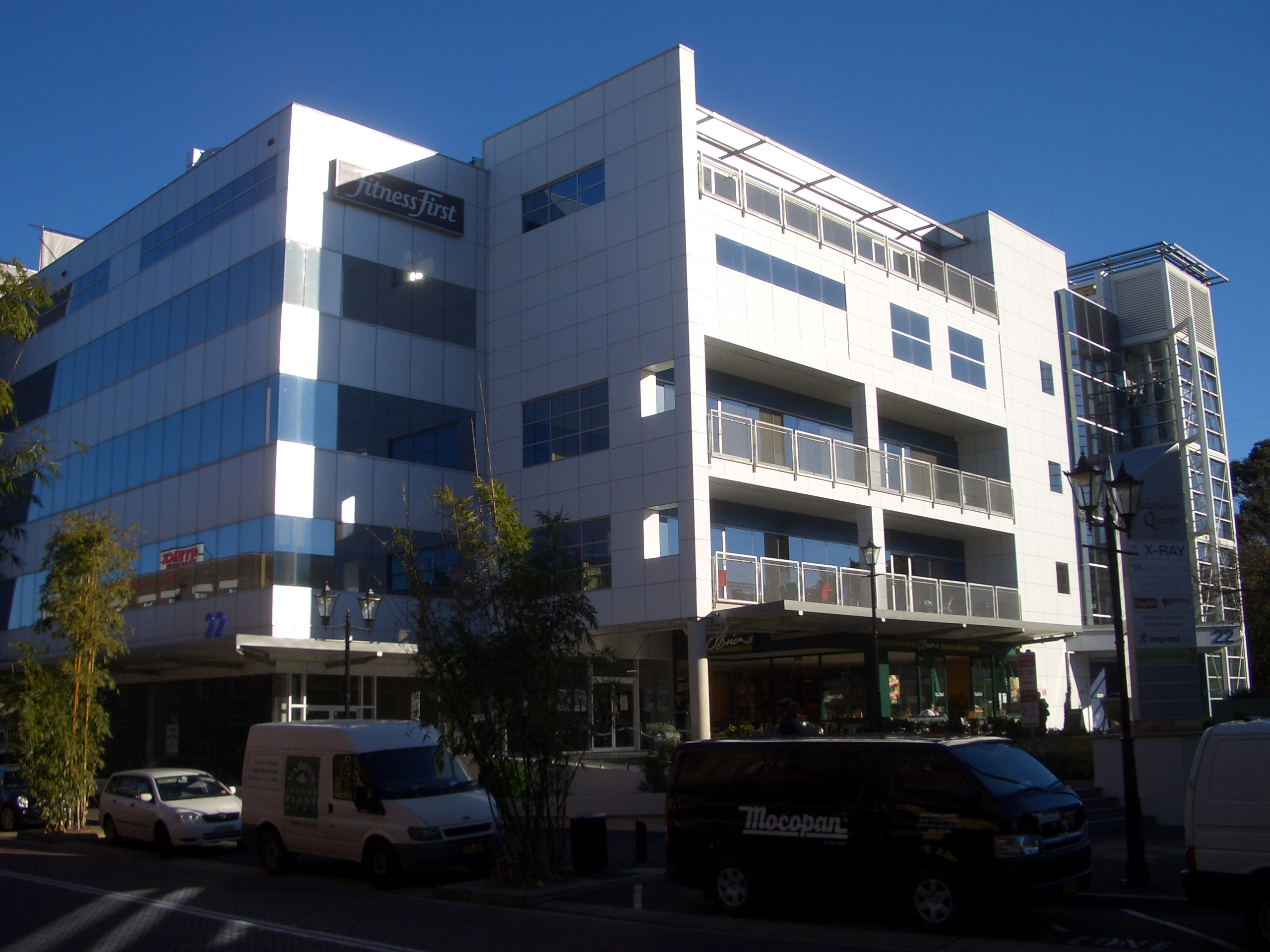
Bakehouse Quarter

== Transport ==
North Strathfield railway station is on the Northern Line of the Sydney Trains network.

Transit Systems operates two bus routes through the suburb of North Strathfield:

- 410: Macquarie Park to Hurstville
- 458: Ryde to Burwood

== Schools ==
Strathfield North Public School is located on Concord Road. The McDonald College is a performing arts school. There is also a new Catholic School (opened 2015) - Our Lady of the Assumption Catholic Primary School.

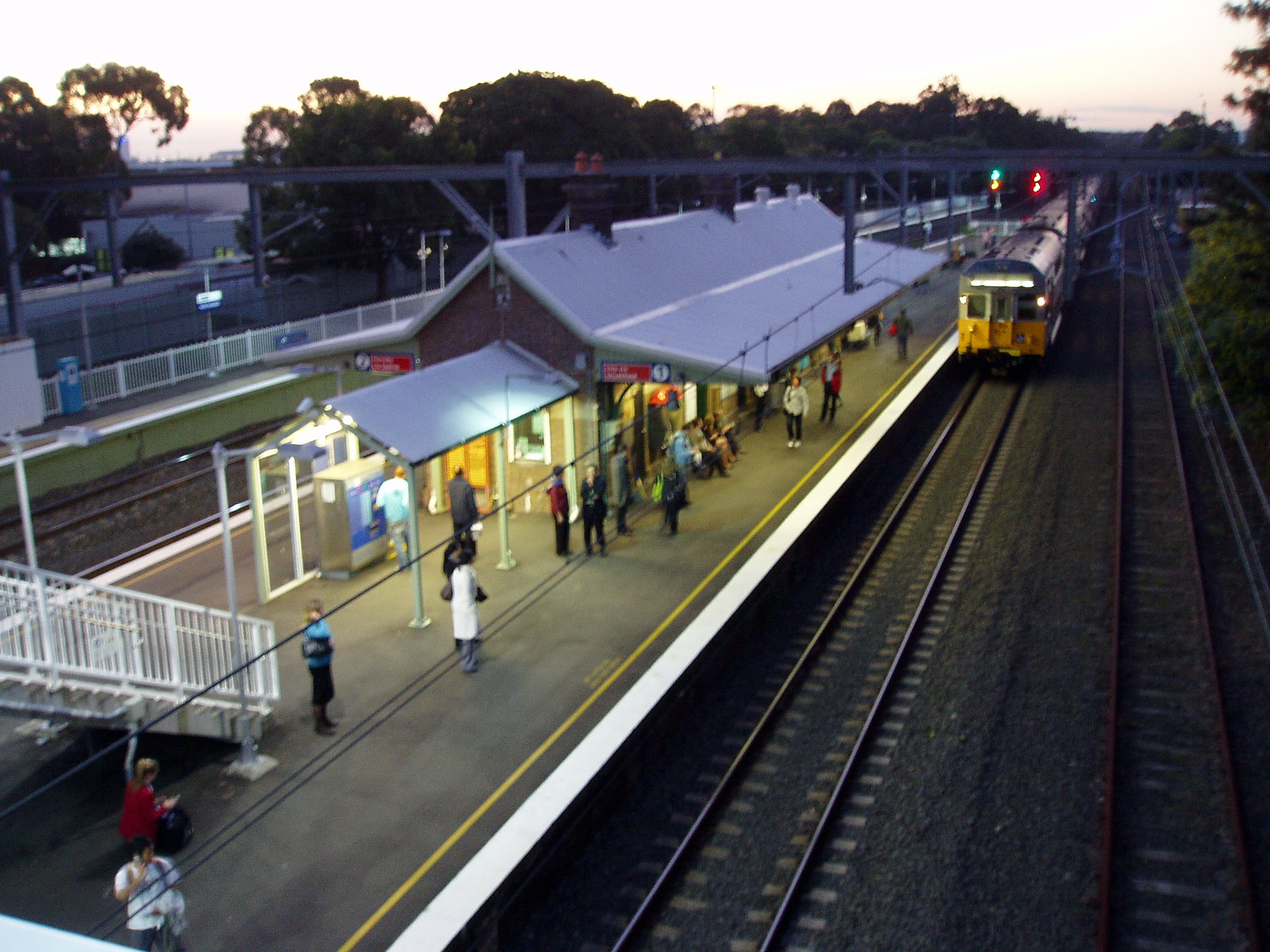
North Strathfield Station

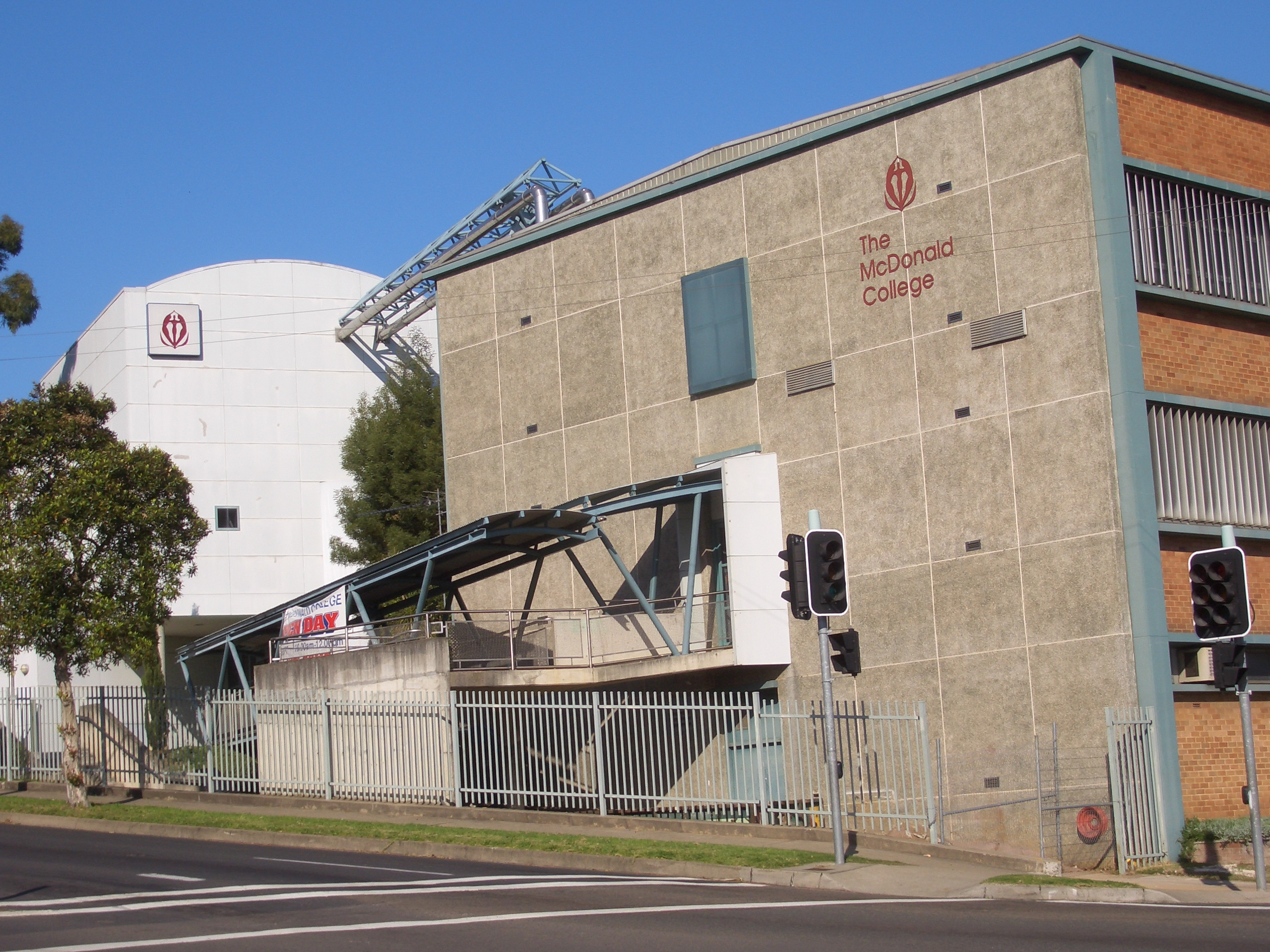
The McDonald College

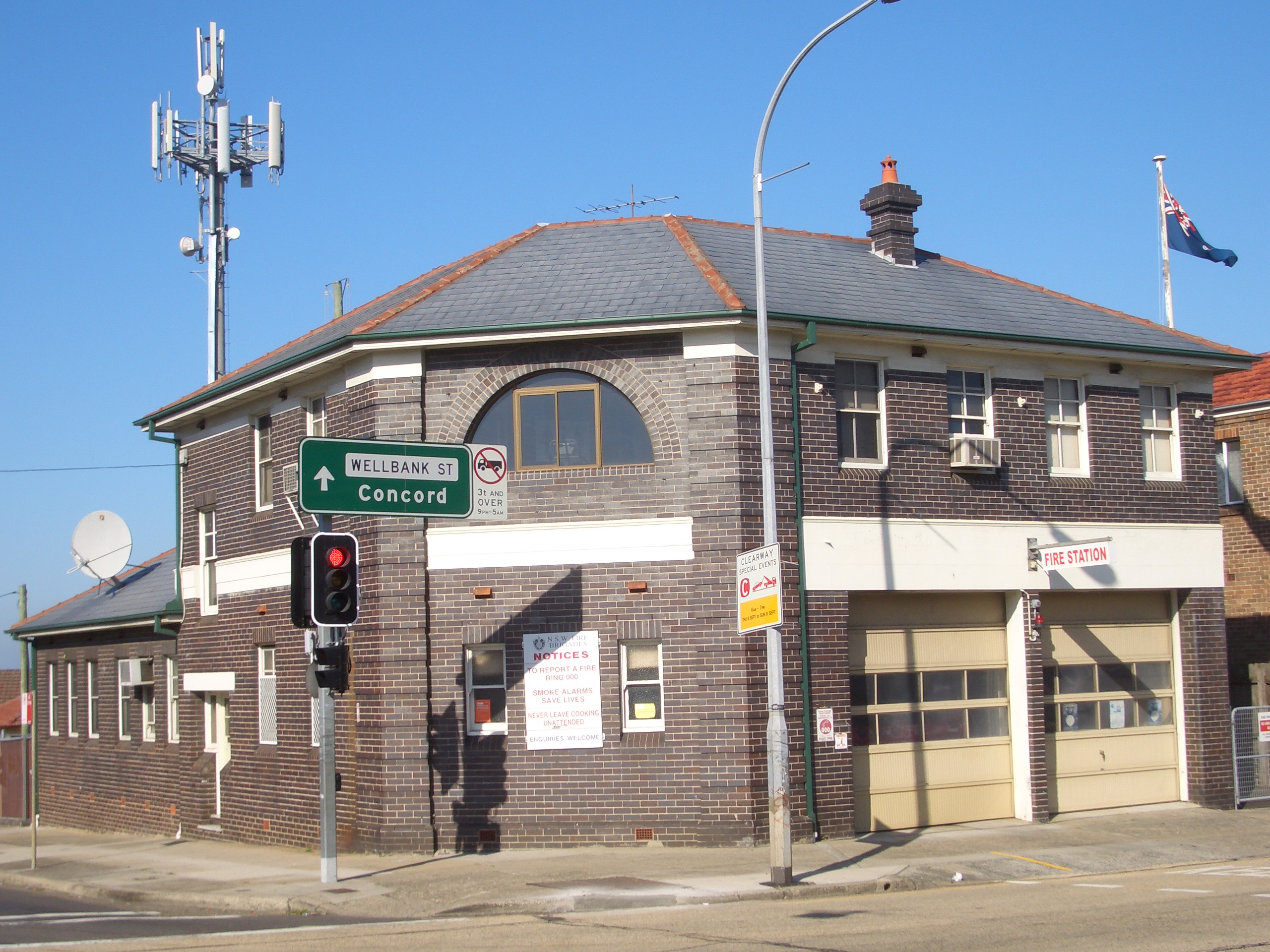
Fire Station, Concord Road
