= SS Ayrfield =

Australian tourist attraction

Coordinates: 33°49′59.6″S 151°4′36″E

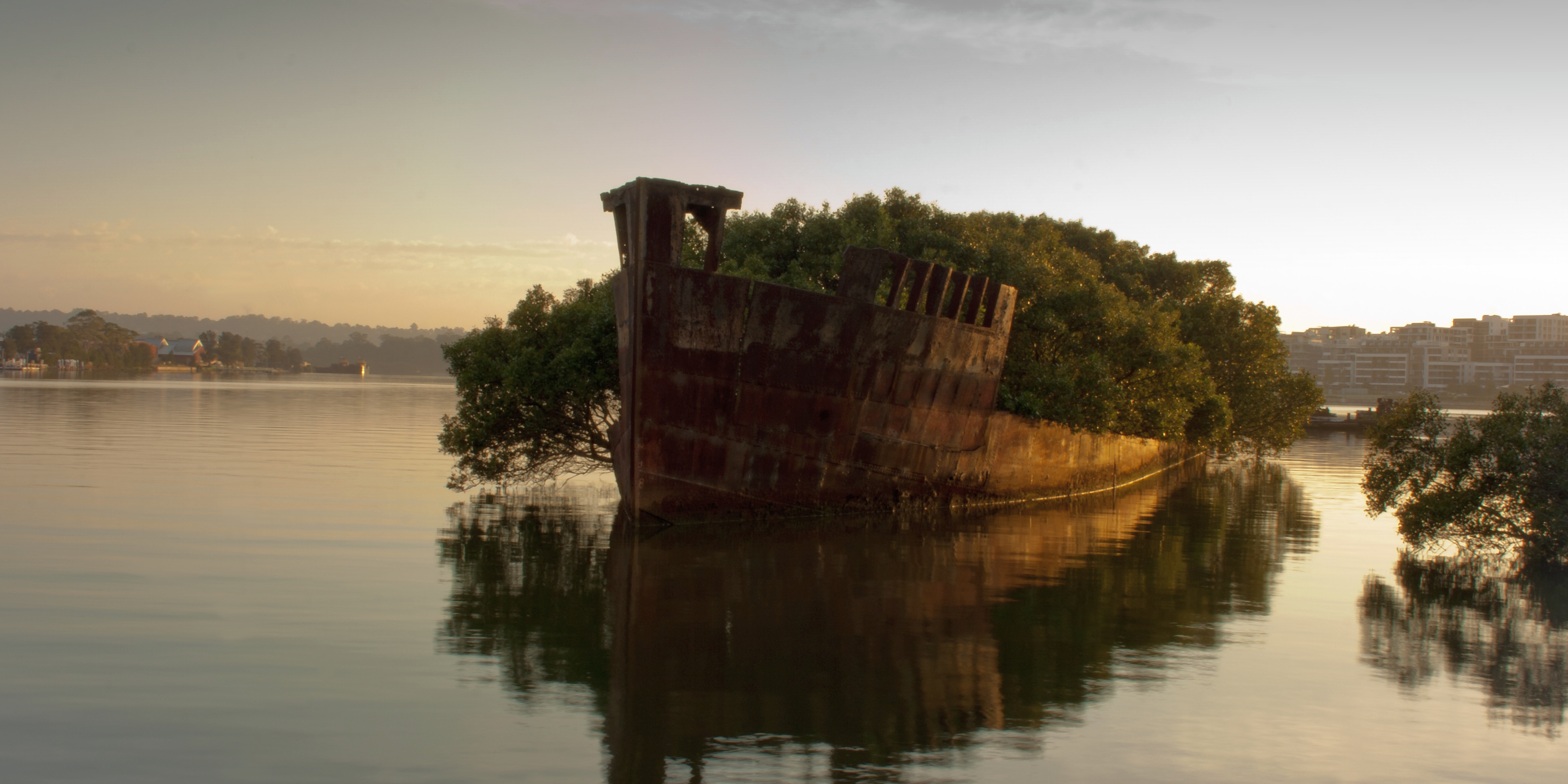
- The remains of the SS Ayrfield in Homebush Bay

History

Australia
- Name: SS Ayrfield
- Owner: R. W. Miller Steamship Company
- Route: Newcastle to Sydney
- Builder: Grangemouth Dockyard Company
- Launched: 24 August 1911
- Completed: 1911
- Maiden voyage: Grangemouth, Scotland to Sydney, Australia
- Out of service: 1972
- Fate: Decommissioned and abandoned
- Status: Tourist site

General characteristics
- Class & type: Coal-fired cargo ship
- Tonnage: 1,140 tonnes
- Length: 79.1 m (260 ft)
- Beam: 10.5 m (34 ft)
- Speed: 10.5 knots

The SS Ayrfield was a steel-hulled cargo ship that was built in Scotland, United Kingdom and was registered in Sydney, Australia in 1912. It was in service for 60 years before becoming a mangrove as it remained aground on Homebush Bay in Western Sydney. Known as a "floating forest", the ship has been reclaimed by dense stands of trees whose branches cascade over its sides, and gradually break down the hull. It is the most popular of the abandoned freighters found in the Parramatta River, with the other lesser known ones being the SS Heroic, HMAS Karangi, and SS Mortlake Bank.

== History ==
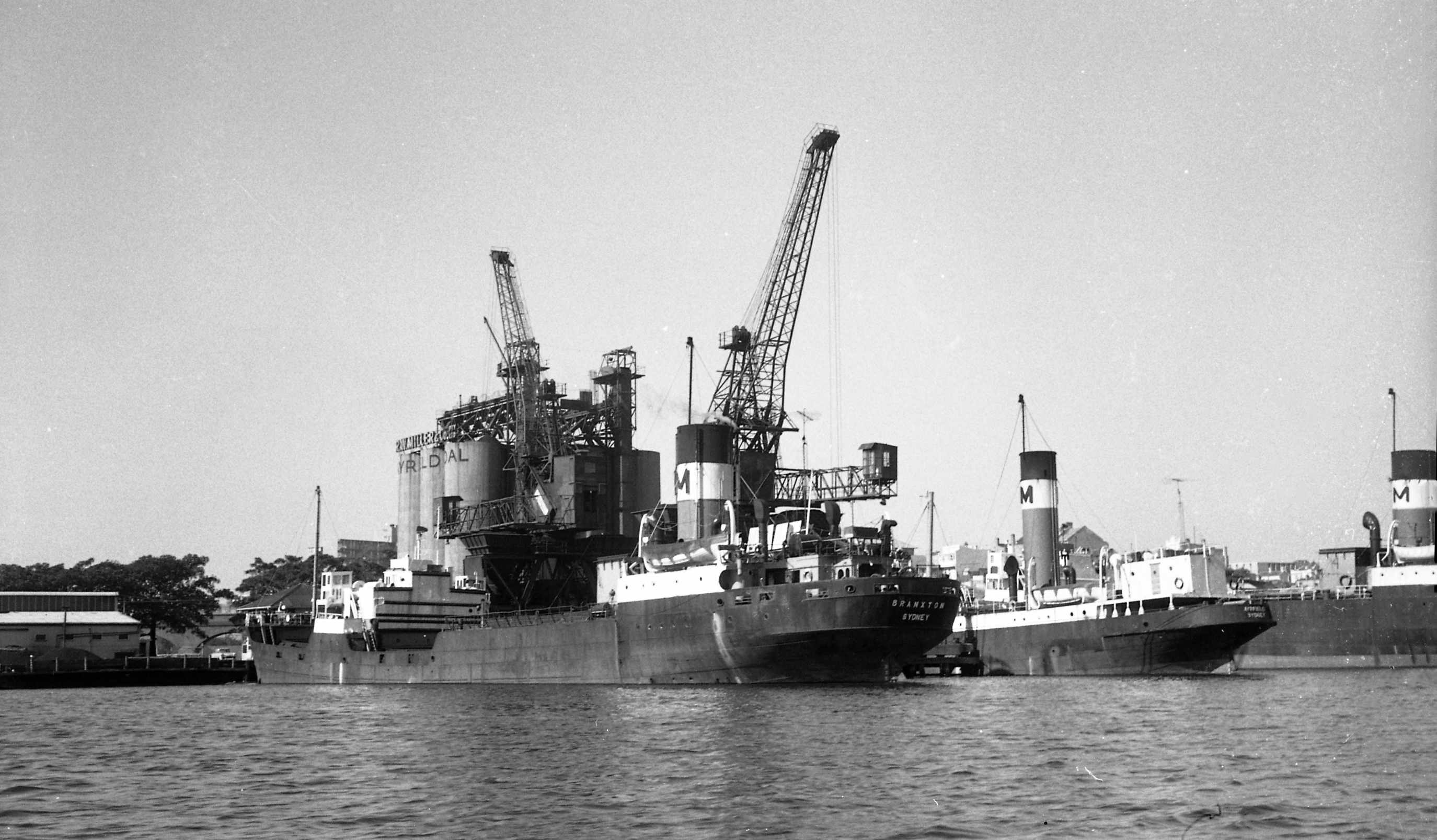
The ship (between Branxton and Teralba) at Blackwattle Bay (1968).

In 1911, G.S. Yuill & Company had a ship built called the Corrimal in a dockyard in Grangemouth, Scotland. It landed in Sydney a year later and served in coastal trade.

In 1926, J.G. White, who had been Yuill's agent, founded the White Steam Ship Company and took over the Corrimal. A year later, he was bankrupt, and in July the ship was acquired by Hammond & Co., only to be bought again in November by James Patrick & Co.

From 1941 through 1945, during World War II generally, and specifically the Pacific War, the Corrimal transported supplies to US troops. The ship had been in Darwin Harbour during the Japanese bombing of it and the British nuclear tests at the Montebello Islands in Western Australia.

In 1951, after the war, the Corrimal was renamed the Ayrfield, when Miller Steamship Company took over the ship, converting it into a collier at Mort's Dock for use as a sixty-miler on short-haul coastal trades. It ran from Newcastle to Sydney for the rest of its working life, remaining in service until 1969, before being designated for scrapping or scuttling.

On 6 October 1972, the SS Ayrfield was decommissioned and sent to Homebush Bay, at the location of old shipwrecking yards, where disused ships were stripped and repurposed.

As the Ayrfield remained floating in the bay, waiting its fate, the value of scrap metal dropped and the wreck yards went defunct. Eventually, the Ayrfield became abandoned in the yard at the bay on the river, as it was rusting and had partially sunk, while gradually being overgrown with trees.

In 1976, nature having reclaimed the Ayrfield, the wreck formally became part of the Homebush Bay Shipwrecks Conservation Area. The shipwreck is protected under the Historic Shipwrecks Act 1976 and the Heritage Act 1977, as the former protects relics over fifty years old.

== Ecology ==
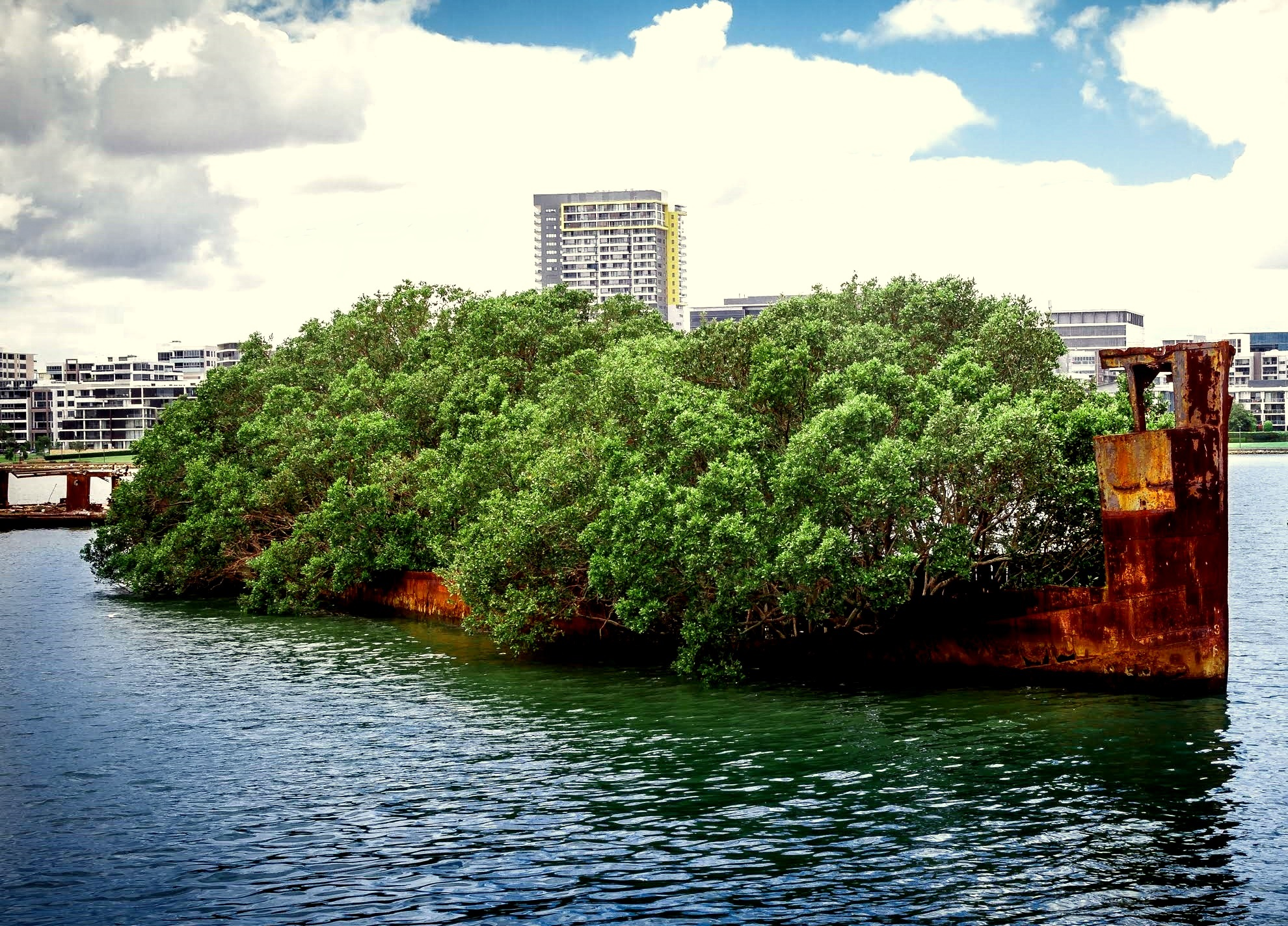
The dense mangroves engulfing the wreck

The mangrove forests along the shores of Homebush Bay, primarily composed of Avicennia marina (grey mangrove), produced abundant seeds that were dispersed by birds and gradually fell onto the wreck. Therefore, over time, the seeds sprouted on the ship’s hull and grew into the large trees that form the mangrove visible today. Shorebirds like silver gulls, the pied stilt and grey teal, among others, take refuge in the wreck.

The mangrove forest on the ship are proximate to the Badu Mangroves in Bicentennial Park, which are also connected to the coastal salt marsh ecological community in the area. The grey mangrove, which is found on the wreck, is known to colonise saltmarsh habitats (which include Wilsonia backhousei), mainly due to increased tidal inundation. Routine tidal inundation of salt marsh can promote the growth of mangroves, hence the vigorous stand of them on the wreck. Mangroves are protected under the Fisheries Management Act 1994 (NSW).

In the future, the Ayrfield and the other wrecks in the area will rust way, though the mangroves and trees that took root in the Ayrfield's hull will most likely persist in its place.

== Sightseeing ==
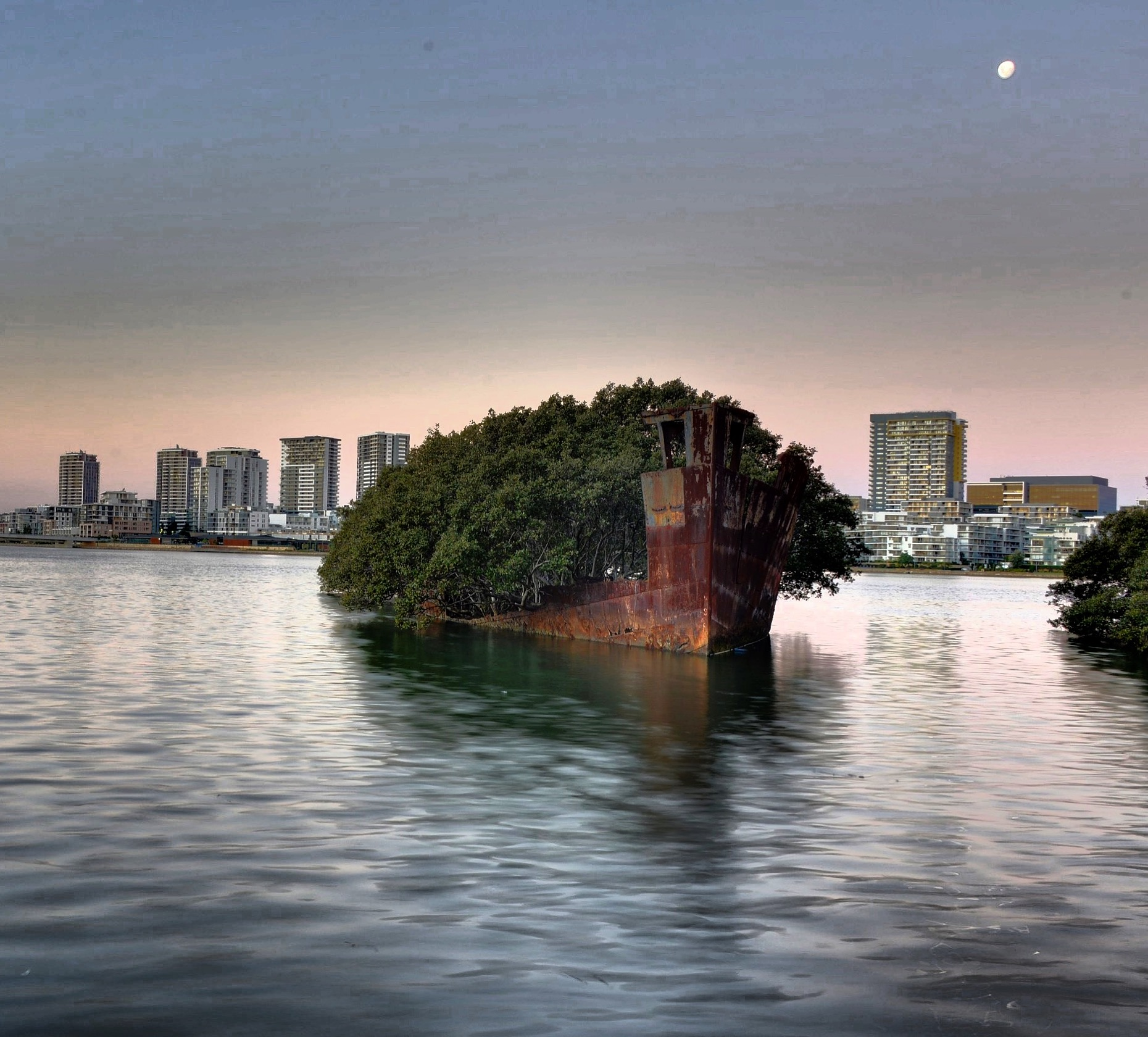
The wreck with Rhodes apartment blocks in background

Located on the south bank of the Parramatta River in Western Sydney, the wreck today is a small tourist attraction and it attracts ruin photographers, as the shipwreck is engulfed in bright green, lush vegetation that contrast the decaying ship hull. Its eroding hulks have become a favourite for photography, in addition to its dense mangroves that have grown in the cabins and on the decks. During sunset, the rust on the hulls light up in a striking orange colour that contrast the bright green vegetation. The ship can only be observed from a distance. Due to the rotting deck and rusting parts, boarding the ship is impossible.

The wreck is located near the mouth of Haslams Creek with its bow facing the shore. The site can be spotted from Wentworth Point and Sydney Olympic Park, the two most proximate suburbs to the wreck. It can be accessed from Bennelong Parkway via The Promenade, just opposite of the Sydney International Archery Park, or from Bicentennial Park in the south via the Parklands Circuit walk. The wreck catches the eyes of visitors because in some angles it looks out of place (as if it were in a tropical rainforest), when it is actually in the vicinity of modern apartments in Sydney. Recent residential developments on the shore that overlook the Ayrfield have encouraged more people to learn of the wreck's existence and a Japanese television crew have filmed a part of a game show with the ship used as a locale.

== See also ==
- HMAS Karangi, another shipwreck at Homebush Bay
