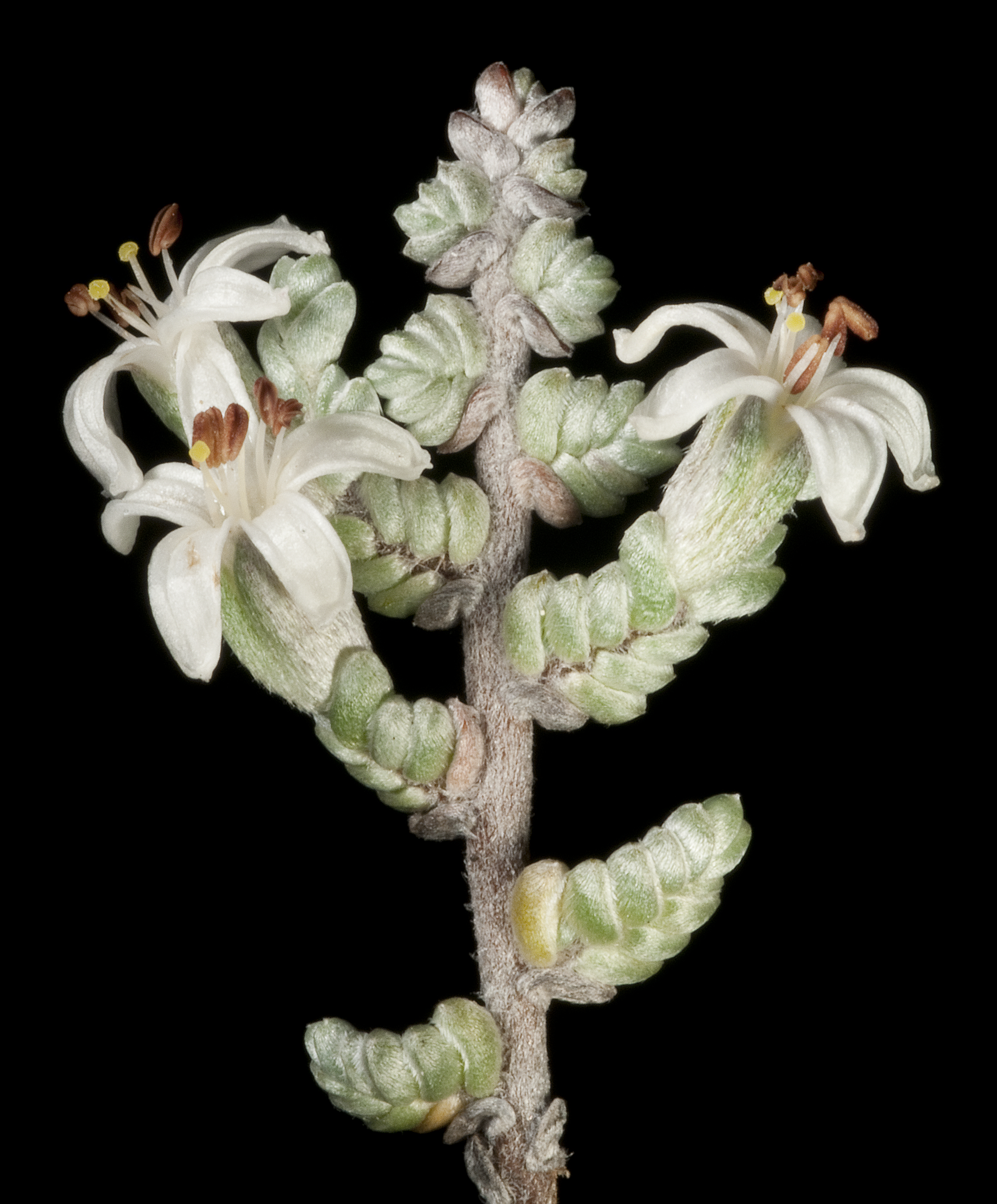
- Wilsonia humilis

Scientific classification
- Kingdom: Plantae
- Clade: Tracheophytes
- Clade: Angiosperms
- Clade: Eudicots
- Clade: Asterids
- Order: Solanales
- Family: Convolvulaceae
- Tribe: Cresseae
- Genus: Wilsonia; R.Br.

= Wilsonia (plant) =

Genus of flowering plants

Wilsonia is a genus of perennial subshrubs in the family Convolvulaceae. The genus is endemic to Australia, occurring in coastal saltmarshes and occasionally in inland saline areas.

== Taxonomy ==
The genus was first formally described in 1810 by Robert Brown in Prodromus Florae Novae Hollandiae. The name honours John Wilson, author of A Synopsis of British Plants.

=== Species ===
The following species are recognised in the genus Wilsonia:

- Wilsonia backhousei Hook.f. - narrow-leaf wilsonia
- Wilsonia humilis R.Br. - silky wilsonia
- Wilsonia rotundifolia (Benth.) Summerh. - round-leaf wilsonia
