= Bicentennial Park, Sydney Olympic Park =

Park in New South Wales, Australia

Bicentennial Park
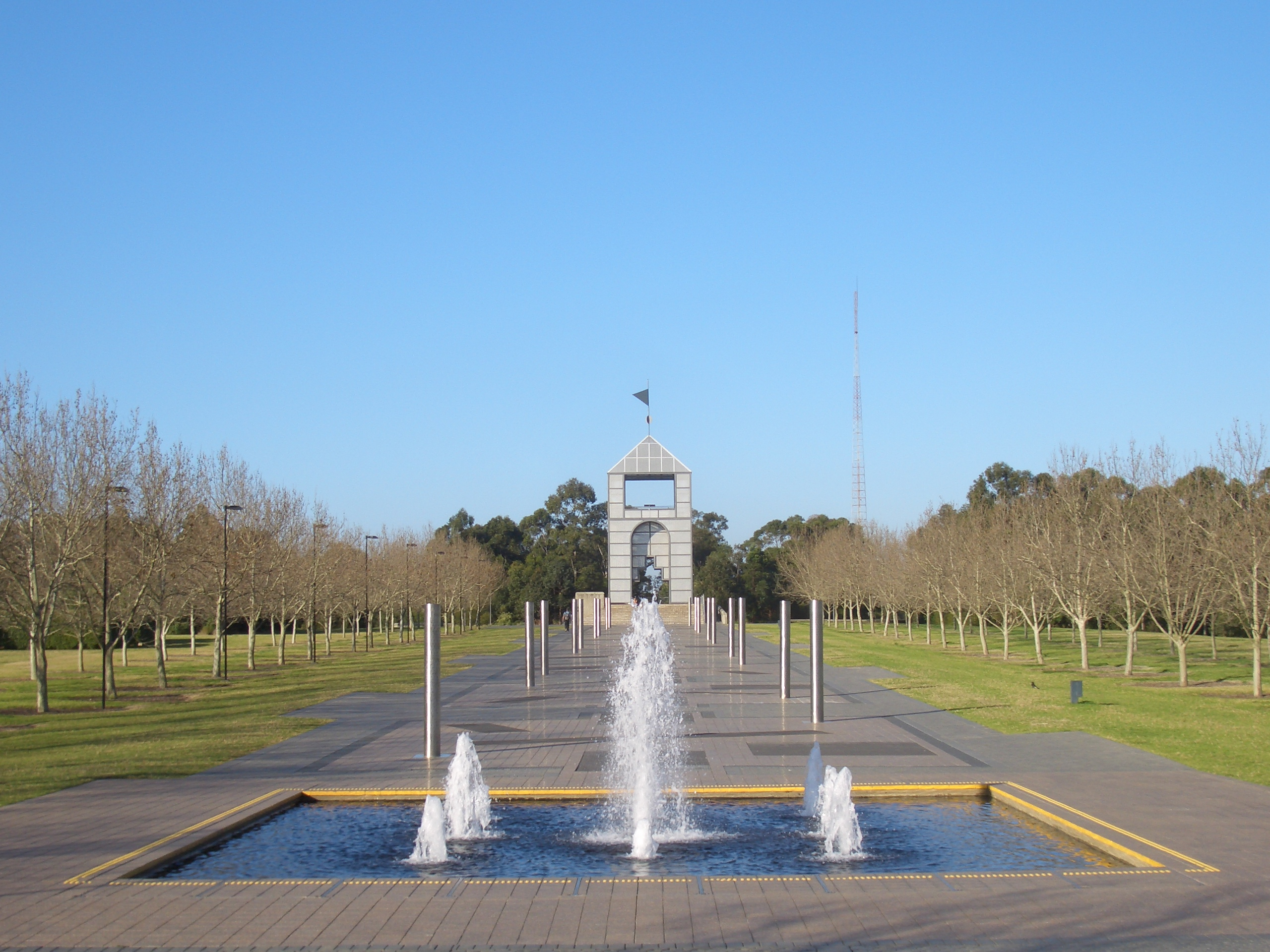
- The fountain, located in the Bicentennial Park
- Interactive map of Bicentennial Park
- Type: Suburban parkland
- Location: Sydney Olympic Park, Homebush Bay, Sydney, New South Wales, Australia
- Coordinates: 33°50′58″S 151°04′41″E
- Area: 40 hectares (99 acres)
- Created: 1 January 1988
- Operator: Sydney Olympic Park Authority
- Open: Sunrise to sunset
- Status: Open all year
- Website: www.sydneyolympicpark.com.au/parks/bicentennial-park

Bicentennial Park is a 40-hectare (99-acre) suburban parkland located 16 kilometres (9.9 mi) west of the Sydney central business district in the suburb of Sydney Olympic Park, in the local government area of City of Parramatta, New South Wales, Australia. Bicentennial Park is situated on the shores of Homebush Bay and is a part of the Sydney Olympic Park. The park is a natural heritage site featuring an important wetland ecosystem and parklands.

== Features ==
It offers visitors recreation, nature-based tours, environmental education and outdoor event experiences. The park has picnic areas, playgrounds, pathways and cycle ways, access to the wetlands, salt marsh and bird hides. It also features Lake Belvedere, Peace Monument, Treillage Tower, Sundial, 'Cyrus the Great' statue, the Silent Hearts Memorial Garden and water features, including the Brickpit Ring Walk. Powells Creek runs through the eastern side of the park.

The Homebush Bay wetland is occupied by animals that thrive in the salt water wetlands.

== History ==
Bicentennial Park was created by the state and federal governments during the 1980s, to celebrate Australia's Bicentenary in 1988. The project involved recycling 47.4 hectares (117 acres) of former rubbish dump into a regional recreation area and the conservation of 53 hectares (130 acres) of a wetland ecosystem on the Parramatta River. The park officially opened on 1 January 1988.

== See also ==
- Parks in Sydney
- Geography of Sydney
- Louise Sauvage Pathway
- Haslams Creek
- Powells Creek
