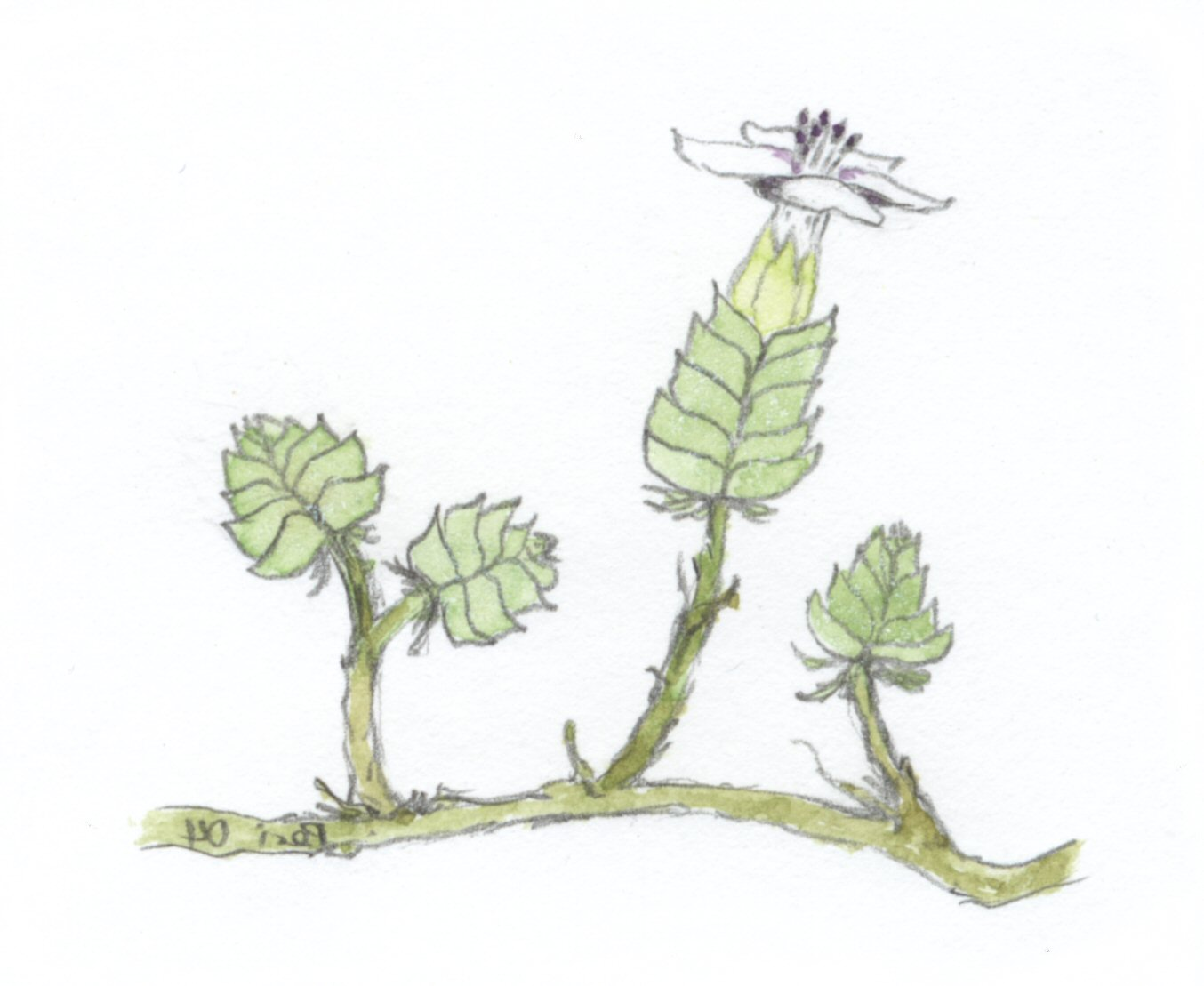

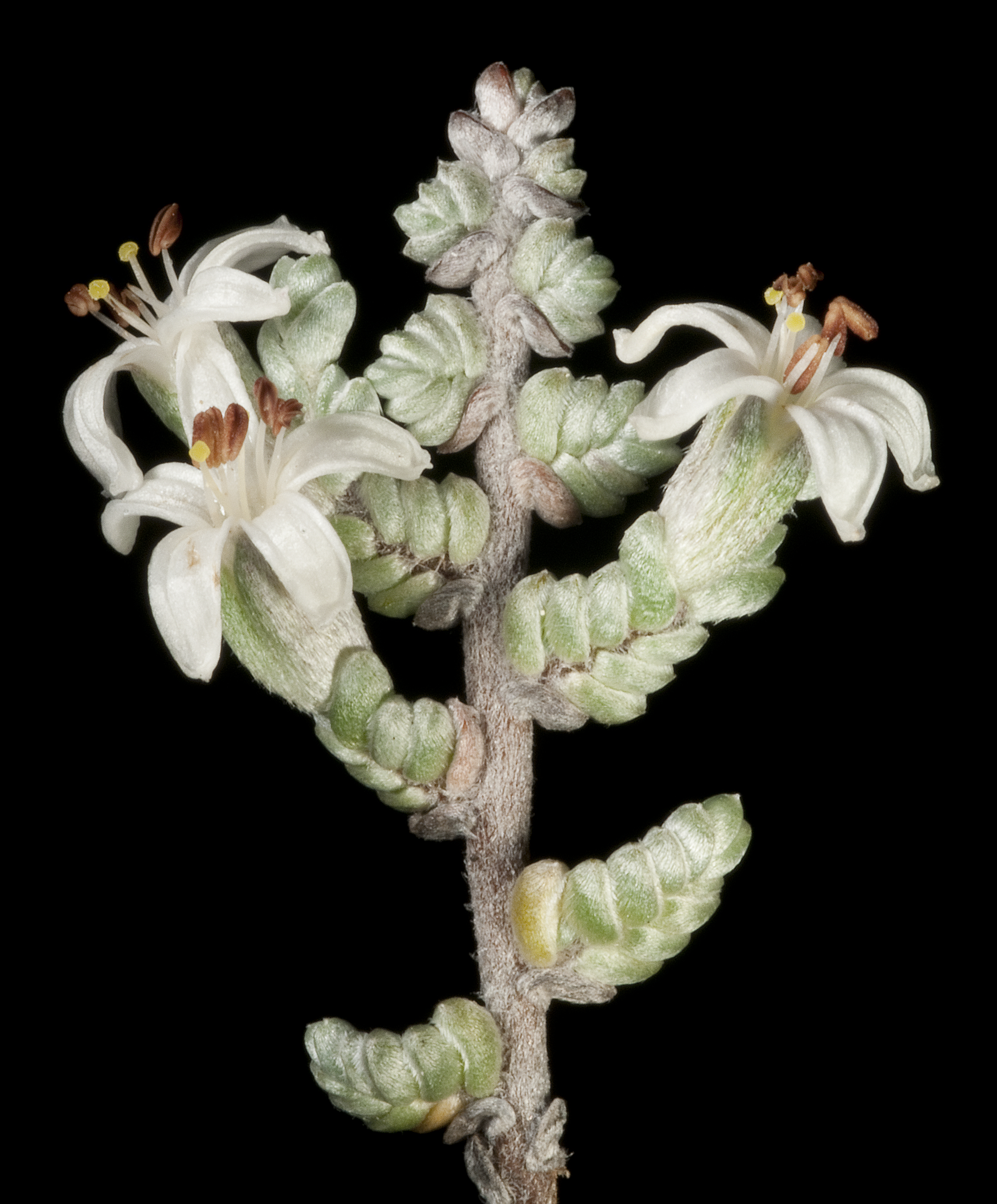

Scientific classification
- Kingdom: Plantae
- Clade: Tracheophytes
- Clade: Angiosperms
- Clade: Eudicots
- Clade: Asterids
- Order: Solanales
- Family: Convolvulaceae
- Genus: Wilsonia
- Species: W. humilis

Binomial name
- Wilsonia humilis R.Br.

Synonyms
- Frankenia cymbifolia Hook.

= Wilsonia humilis =

Species of plant

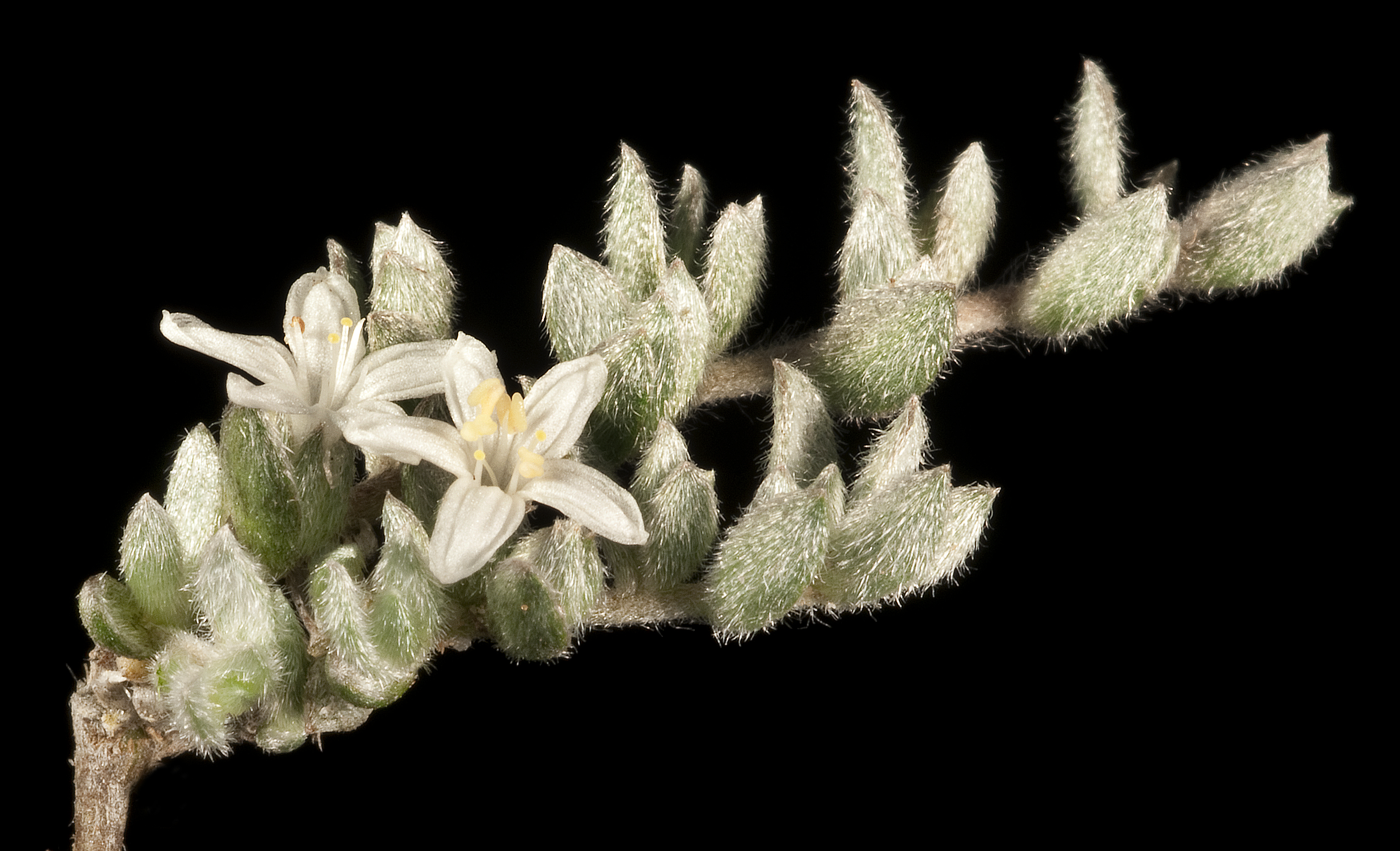

Wilsonia humilis, the silky wilsonia, is a species of perennial subshrub in the family Convolvulaceae. The species is endemic to Australia, occurring in coastal saltmarshes and also occasionally in inland saline areas, often colonising bare ground.

== Description ==
Silky wilsonia is a low-growing mat forming species, growing to 10 cm tall. The plant is covered with short, white hairs imparting a silvery appearance. The small, crowded leaves are concave and overlapping and are 1.5 to 4 mm long and 2 to 3 mm long. White flowers appear between September and December in the species' native range. These are followed by capsular fruits which are 3 mm long.

== Taxonomy ==
The species was first formally described in 1810 by botanist Robert Brown in Prodromus Florae Novae Hollandiae.

== Distribution ==
The species is native to Western Australia, South Australia, Victoria and Tasmania. It has been recorded in New South Wales, but the record is regarded as doubtful. In Tasmania, the species is rare, occurring near Pitwater, Dunalley and Cape Portland.
