= Saleyards Creek =

River in Sydney, Australia

Saleyards Creek (also known as Saleyard Creek) is a canalised urban stream, acting as a stormwater channel, located in Sydney, Australia. Its upstream course follows approximately the boundary between the suburbs of Homebush and Flemington. North of Parramatta Road, both sides of the creek fall within Homebush.

== Description ==
Saleyards Creek has its source in the Rookwood Cemetery beside the suburb of Strathfield, and flows generally northward, approximately following the boundary between the suburbs of Homebush and Flemington.

Saleyards Creek flows through a man-made tunnel under Sydney Markets, Flemington. Emerging into daylight, it continues under Parramatta Road and the M4 Western Motorway. When driving westbound on the M4 Western Motorway it is possible to see a sign showing where Saleyards Creek flows under the motorway, not far east of Homebush Bay Drive.

North of the M4 motorway, both banks of the creek are in the suburb of Homebush, and the creek finally flowing into Powells Creek at Bressington Park, at the boundary between Homebush and Concord West. Powell Creek itself flows into Homebush Bay a short distance to the north.

Saleyards Creek is now lined with concrete banks for its entire length, although the portions of the creek flowing through Airey Park and beside Bressington Park also have trees planted alongside. Since its water is largely provided by rainfall in the Sydney area, flows are reduced to little more than a trickle during dry weather.

The southern part of Saleyards Creek was used as the boundary when cadastral divisions, used for land title purposes, were set down in the 19th century. As a result, the suburb of Homebush, which mostly lie east of the creek, is in the Parish of Concord, while the neighbouring suburb of Flemington (officially Homebush West since 1992), is in the Parish of Liberty Plains. On one definition, the creek also forms the boundary between the Inner West region of Sydney and the neighbouring region of Greater Western Sydney.

== History ==
Saleyards Creek is named after the Flemington cattle saleyards, established in 1909. Once a natural stream, Saleyards Creek was canalised by the Metropolitan Water and Sewerage Board in the 1930s, partly as a work relief project during the Great Depression. The saleyards were rebuilt as the Sydney Markets in the 1970s, and the part of the stream that flows through the markets was culverted.

== Ecological issues ==
Canalisation of the stream has affected salinity and pollution levels in nearby tidal wetlands. Silt build-up from stormwater flows provides a feeding habitat for birds such as ducks and gulls, but interferes with water flow, and so is occasionally removed.

== See also ==
- Powells Creek
- Haslams Creek
