= Powells Creek (Sydney) =

Powells
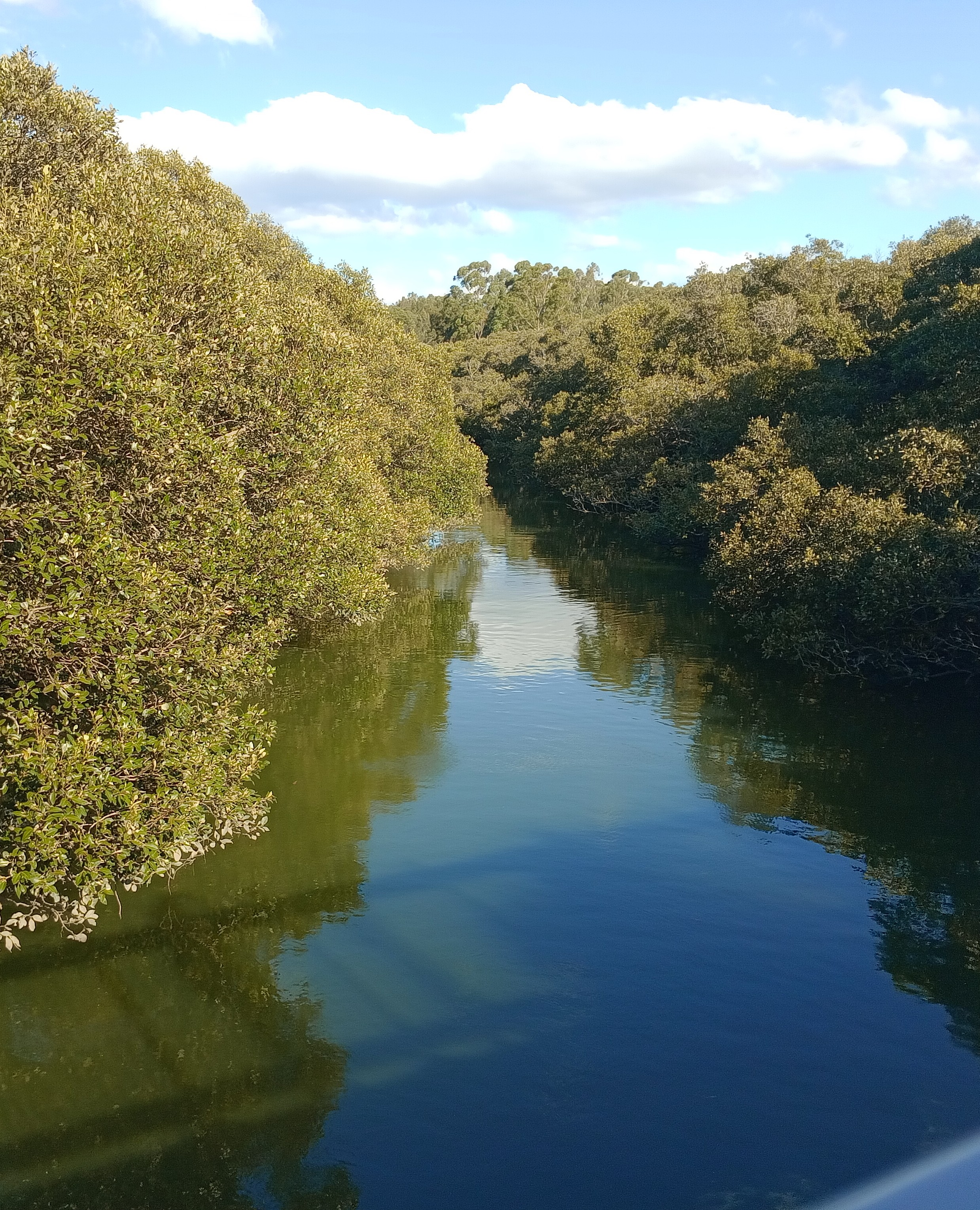
- Powells Creek in Sydney Olympic Park

Location
- Country: Australia
- Municipality: Sydney

Physical characteristics
- Source
  - location: Strathfield
  - coordinates: 33°52′8.1552″S 151°5′27.6792″E
- Source confluence: Saleyards Creek
  - location: Bressington Park, Bicentennial Park
  - coordinates: 33°51′7.3152″S 151°4′55.2786″E
- Mouth: Parramatta River
  - location: Homebush Bay
  - coordinates: 33°50′22.3146″S 151°4′49.8792″E

Basin features
- River system: Parramatta River

Powells Creek, a southern tributary of the Parramatta River, is an urban stream west of Sydney Harbour, located in Sydney, Australia. It flows through Sydney Olympic Park and joins Parramatta River at Homebush Bay.

== Ecology ==
Powells Creek begins as a concrete stormwater channel in the inner-western suburb of Strathfield, and flows north-west between the suburbs of Homebush and North Strathfield, past Bressington Park, where it joins Saleyards Creek. Beyond this point its concrete walls do not continue, and it becomes a mangrove-lined stream, flowing through Bicentennial Park and emptying into Homebush Bay.

In 2008 the City of Canada Bay called for community responses to the Powells Creek Renewal Project, that intended to improve the appearance of the creek upstream of the confluence with Saleyards Creek. Canalisation of Powells Creek and Saleyards Creek in the 1930s affected salinity and pollution levels in nearby tidal wetlands. A drop board weir installed in 1998 has partly restored natural tidal flows.

Once extensive, salt marsh borders of Powell's Creek have largely vanished with infilling and urbanisation. A local project seeking, and compiling information on the past of the land bordering Powell's Creek has been ongoing since 2008.

== See also ==
- Haslams Creek
- Saleyards Creek
