= Homebush Bay =

Area of the Parramatta River in New South Wales, Australia

Coordinates: 33°49′43″S 151°04′51″E

- Suburb
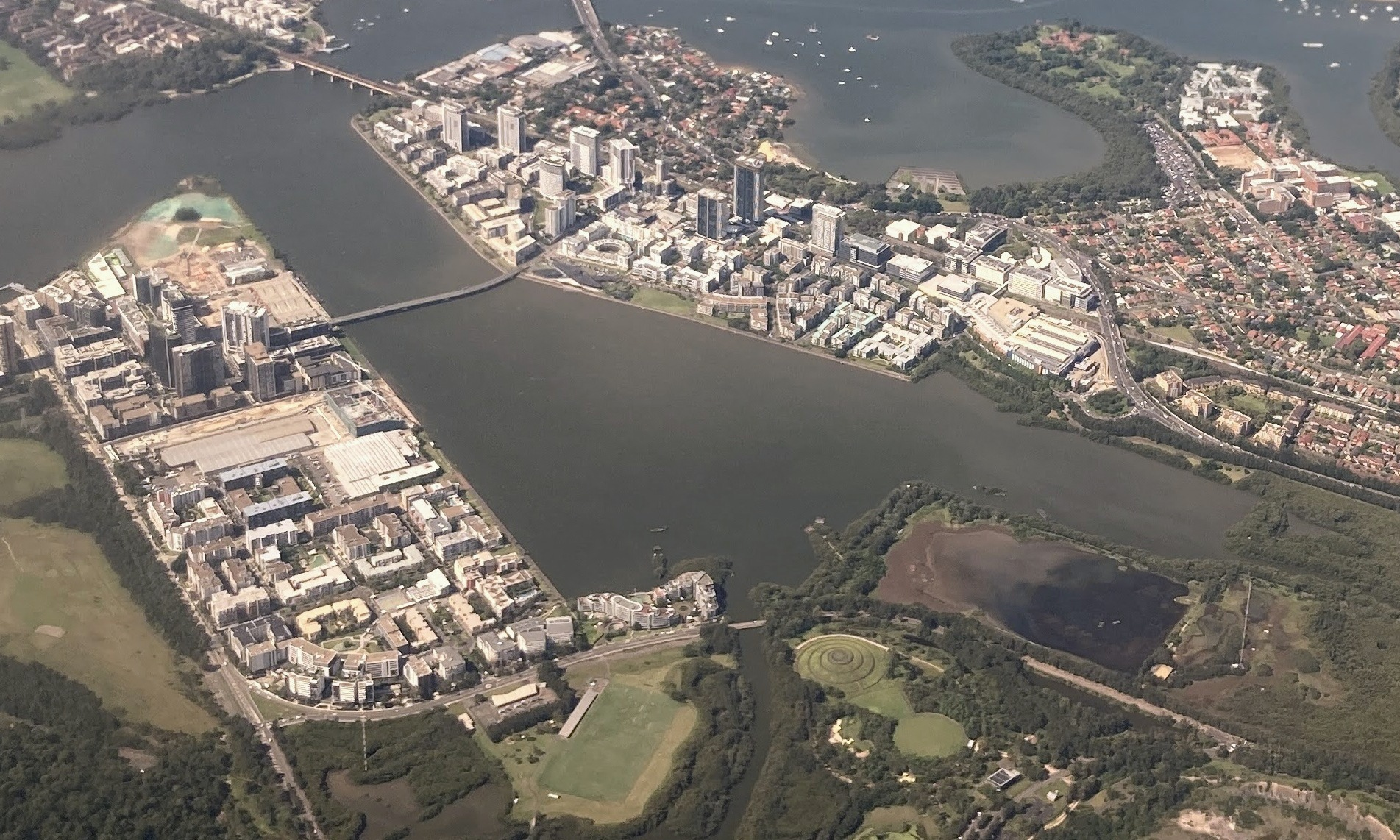
- Homebush Bay, aerial view east towards Rhodes.
- Interactive map of Homebush Bay
- Country: Australia
- State: New South Wales
- City: Sydney
- LGAs: City of Parramatta; City of Canada Bay
- Location: 13 km (8.1 mi) west of Sydney CBD

Government
  - State electorates: Auburn; Drummoyne
  - Federal division: Reid
- Postcode: 2127
Suburbs around Homebush Bay
Melrose Park	Meadowbank	Rhodes
Wentworth Point	Homebush Bay	Liberty Grove
Sydney Olympic Park	Sydney Olympic Park	North Strathfield

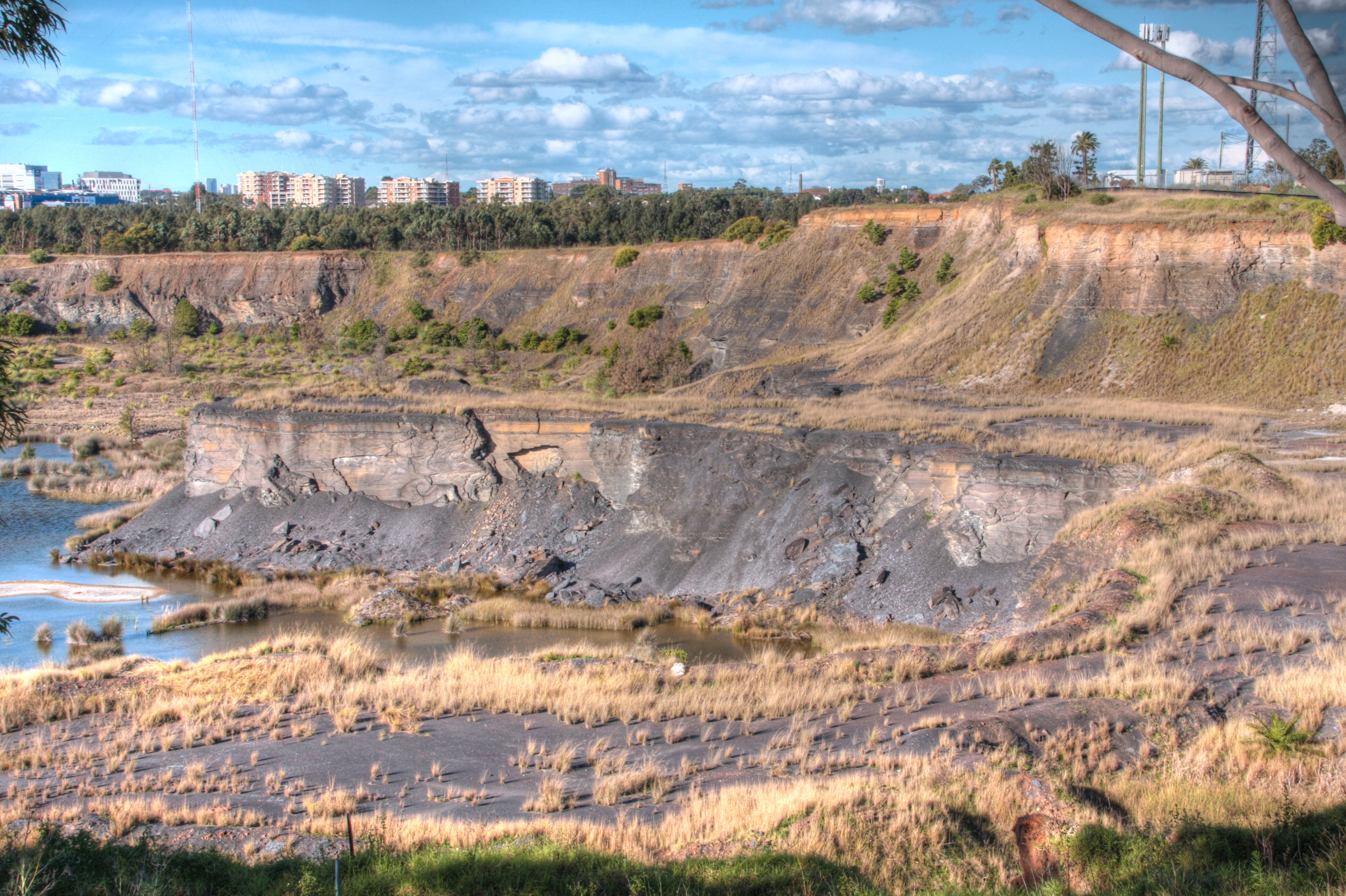
Former quarry, Sydney Olympic Park

Homebush Bay is a bay on the south bank of the Parramatta River, in the west of Sydney, Australia. The name is also sometimes used to refer to an area to the west and south of the bay itself, which was formerly an official suburb of Sydney, and has now become the suburbs of Sydney Olympic Park, Wentworth Point and part of the neighbouring suburb of Lidcombe, all part of the City of Parramatta. Homebush Bay is located 13 kilometres (8.1 mi) west of the Sydney central business district.

The bay has a natural and artificial shoreline on the southern side of the Parramatta River between the suburbs of Wentworth Point and Rhodes. In the 1900s the bay was contaminated with dioxins and other chemicals by the local Union Carbide chemical plant, which has led to commercial fishing bans in most of Sydney Harbour, and health advisories about limiting the quantity of fish eaten from the Parramatta River. Other contaminants in the bay include phthalates, lead, polycyclic aromatic hydrocarbons, DDT, and heavy metals. The eastern shore of the bay was remediated starting in 2008 to remove about 75% of the dioxins from the bay. Remediation was completed in mid-2010, however fishing is still prohibited in Homebush Bay.

The western shore of Homebush Bay is in the local government area of the City of Parramatta, while its eastern shore is in the City of Canada Bay. As a result, the bay forms part of the geographical boundary between the Greater Western Sydney region in the west and the Inner West region of Sydney in the east, except that the suburb of Wentworth Point, at the northern tip of the western bank, is sometimes marketed as being in the Inner West.

Homebush and Homebush West are suburbs to the south, some distance away from the shores of the bay, in the Municipality of Strathfield.

== History ==
The region is a part of the traditional land of the Wann-gal people who lived in Homebush Bay thousands of years ago and survived on the resources offered by the estuary. The first European settlers arrived here in 1793 and declared the land as 'Flats' whose grants were given to free men. For this reason, it came to be known as the 'Liberty Plains'. The land was dominated by two families during this period - the Blaxlands and the Wentworths.

The Home Bush Estate was established in the 1800s by the colony's assistant surgeon D'arcy Wentworth. According to local government historian Michael Jones, "Wentworth is popularly credited with having called the area after his 'home in the bush', although Homebush is also a place in Kent." The Wentworth family's estate lay on the southwestern shore of the bay, between Powell's Creek and Haslam's Creek, and south to Parramatta Road. Further to the northwest, to the west of Haslam's Creek, the Blaxland family owned the Newington Estate. The bay took its name from the Home Bush Estate. When the railway came through the area south of Parramatta Road in 1855, a station was built in the area to serve the racecourse on the Wentworth estate, and took its name ("Homebush") from the estate also. The village and later suburb that developed to the south of - and later the north of - the railway station took its name from the station, and is today partly in the suburb of Homebush and partly in the suburb of Strathfield. Meanwhile, the Home Bush Estate became part of the Municipality of Rookwood in 1891, renamed Lidcombe in 1906. Thereafter, it was part of the suburb of Lidcombe and known as "North Lidcombe". In 1989, North Lidcombe was renamed "Homebush Bay". This history of name borrowing has resulted in the names "Homebush Bay" and "Homebush" being used at various times for a large and disparate area ranging from modern-day Wentworth Point in the City of Parramatta, to the seat of the Municipality of Strathfield in modern-day Strathfield, almost 6 km away.

Wentworth Point, the point on the western extremity of the bay, and Wentworth Bay, the nearby inlet on the western shore of Homebush Bay, are named after the Wentworth family - the bay has now disappeared due to land reclamation. Mud Island was an island in the bay, which became connected with the western mainland due to land reclamation.

In the 20th century, Homebush Bay became a centre of heavy industry, with large scale land reclamations to accommodate industrial facilities. When industrial operations scaled down, the bay became a dumping ground for a large range of unwanted material - from waste to broken up ships, even toxic industrial waste. Union Carbide had manufactured chemicals, including Agent Orange, on the site and dioxins produced as a by product were buried in landfill or left in drums.

A drive to regenerate and rehabilitate the bay began in the 1980s. This led to the construction of Bicentennial Park, including a program to regenerate some of the mangrove wetlands and saltmarshes which existed around the bay pre-development. In preparation for the 2000 Sydney Olympics, it was decided to site Sydney Olympic Park at Homebush Bay, which spurred the further regeneration and rehabilitation of the bay. A range of residential and commercial developments also began around the bay, including the development of a large shopping centre and residential district at Rhodes on the eastern shore.

=== Suburb name change ===
The former Auburn Council sought public comment on a proposal to rename the suburb of Homebush Bay, as well as removing connotations and confusion with its namesake suburb Homebush. The waterfront residential area was renamed Wentworth Point on 2 October 2009, consistent with the gazetting of the northern part of the peninsula in 1976. the Carter Street industrial precinct was absorbed by the neighbouring suburb of Lidcombe, and the remaining bulk of the suburb, consisting of Sydney Olympic Park, was renamed to that name as a suburb.

== Hydrography ==
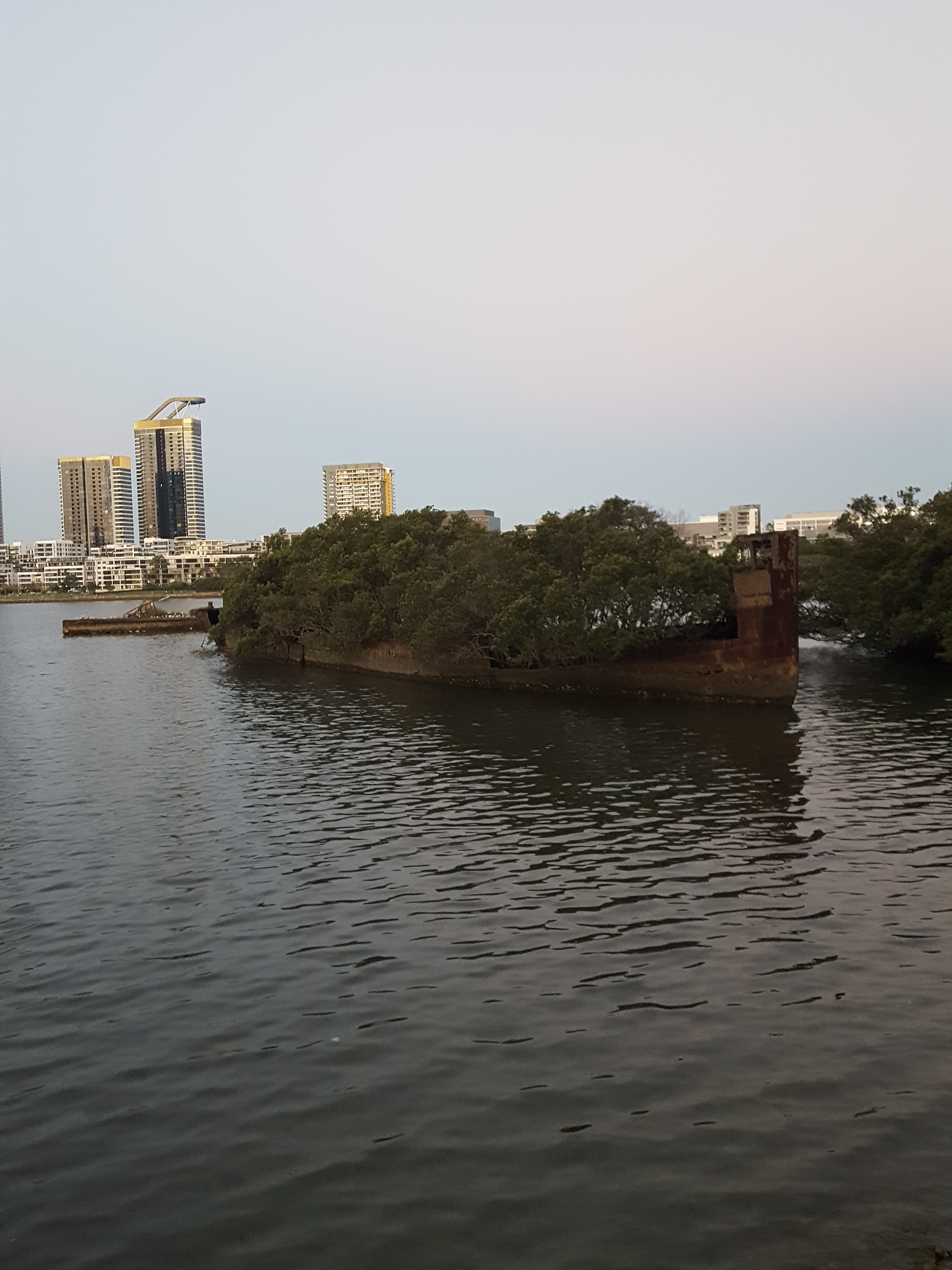
The wreck of SS Ayrfield, which is a small tourist site, with Rhodes in the background

Homebush Bay is located on the southern shore of Parramatta River. Immediately to the east is Bray Bay, which is separated from Homebush Bay by a narrow peninsula (considerably expanded through land reclamation) that forms the suburb of Rhodes. It is across the Parramatta River from Meadowbank. It is the westernmost of the major bays on the Parramatta River.

Several tributaries enter Parramatta River at Homebush Bay: Powells Creek is joined by tributaries Boundary Creek and Saleyards Creek not far from the southern shore of the bay, and flows into the bay from the south, while Haslams Creek joins the bay further to the north.

The shoreline of Homebush Bay is in large parts artificial, with large scale land reclamations for industrial purposes occurring throughout the 20th century. Its history of use for industry and as dumping ground has left the bay heavily contaminated, including with dioxin and other chemicals produced by Union Carbide operations. Fishing is prohibited in Homebush Bay for health reasons. Other contamination includes phthalates, lead, polycyclic aromatic hydrocarbons, DDT and heavy metals. Remediation from 2008-2010 removed about 75% of the dioxin from the bay.

A number of ships' hulls are visible in Homebush Bay, remains of the ship-breaking operations in the bay during the mid-20th century. These are the steam colliers SS Ayrfield and SS Mortlake Bank, steam tugboat SS Heroic, and boom defence vessel HMAS Karangi, all broken up in the early 1970s and now lying near the south-western shore of the bay. Remains of a number of smaller abandoned or broken up vessel lie nearby.

== Landmarks ==
Bicentennial Park is located on the southern shore of the bay, and contains an area of rehabilitated mangrove wetland representative of the native state of the bay.

Sydney Olympic Park is a 640 hectares (1,600 acres) area to the south west of Homebush Bay (and within the former suburb of Homebush Bay) which was notable as the site of the 2000 Olympic Games. Since then, there has been much development in the area including office buildings and apartments in the centre of Sydney Olympic Park. Three completed residential developments in the area are Newington, The Waterfront and Mariners Cove.

The Sydney Showground relocated from Moore Park in 1998, in preparation for the Olympic Games. The Sydney Showground provided Olympic venues along with Stadium Australia, Sydney SuperDome, Athletics Centre, Aquatic Centre, Tennis Centre, Hockey Stadium and multiple sports halls.

On the eastern shore, within the suburb of Rhodes, lies the large Rhodes Waterside shopping centre.

The Novotel Hotel features cafes, restaurants and bars with outdoor facilities that cater for special events held at Sydney Olympic Park.

Bennelong Bridge, a bridge open to pedestrians, cyclists and buses but not to cars, crosses the bay near its mouth (between Rhodes on the east bank and Wentworth Point on the west bank). The bridge opened on 22 May 2016. Between 2014 and 2016, during construction, the low bridge was protected by a "maritime exclusion zone", meaning that watercraft was not able to enter or leave Homebush Bay.

== Transport ==
Two stations on the Sydney Trains metropolitan passenger rail network sit near the shores of the bay. To the south-west, Olympic Park railway station was built to cater for large crowds to the precinct during the 2000 Sydney Olympics, and is especially heavily used for special events in the Olympic Park precinct. It is serviced by a shuttle connecting Olympic Park to Lidcombe railway station. On the eastern shore, Rhodes railway station is on the T9 Northern line.

Sydney Ferries' Parramatta River ferry services run to the Sydney Olympic Park ferry wharf on the bay. Originally designed to service Sydney Olympic Park, the wharf now mainly serves the residents of Wentworth Point. Busways run a number of regular bus services to the area around the bay. There are also a number of Sydney Olympic Park bus routes for sporting events, concerts and other major events at the Sydney Olympic Park precinct such as the Sydney Royal Easter Show.

A light rail line is planned to be constructed on the western shore of the bay, which will connect Olympic Park railway station with the centre of Parramatta, to the west. The line was initially planned to run alongside the parkland on the southern shore and connect with Strathfield railway station, but in the current plans the line will terminate in nearby Lidcombe.

== Culture ==
=== Events ===
- Sydney Royal Easter Show is an annual agricultural show held at the Sydney Showground at Homebush Bay.

=== Sport ===
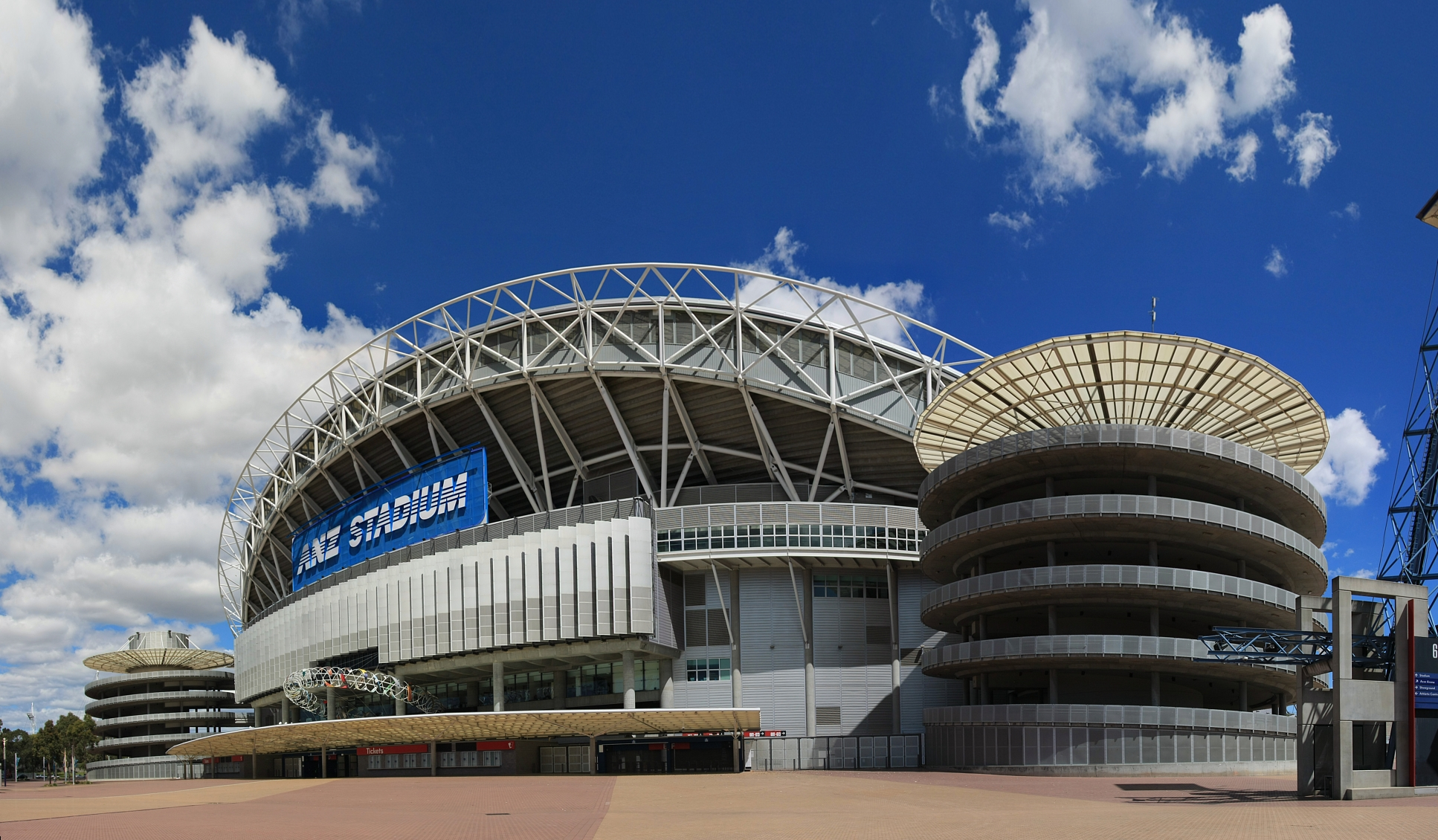
Stadium Australia

For more information see Stadium Australia

- National Rugby League games including the Grand Final are played at Stadium Australia.
- AFL, the GWS Giants call this stadium their home, along with several Sydney Swans games being held at Stadium Australia each season. The stadium is also home to several NRL teams such as (Wests Tigers, Canterbury Bulldogs, South Sydney Rabbitohs, NSW Blues).
- Cricket NSW Blues play 2 domestic ING Cup matches at Stadium Australia each season
- Football (soccer) the Socceroos have played a number of matches including matches against
  - Uruguay for qualification into the 2006 FIFA World Cup
  - Friendly against Paraguay.
  - A-league team Sydney FC also played a friendly game at Stadium Australia in November 2007 against David Beckham's Los Angeles Galaxy which drew a crowd of 80,000.
- V8 Supercars have raced on a track located within the precinct in the Sydney 500 every year from 2009 to 2016 as a round of the V8 Supercars championship.

=== Pop culture ===
The Brickpit at Sydney Olympic Park was used as a location for the filming of Mad Max: Beyond Thunderdome.

== Gallery ==
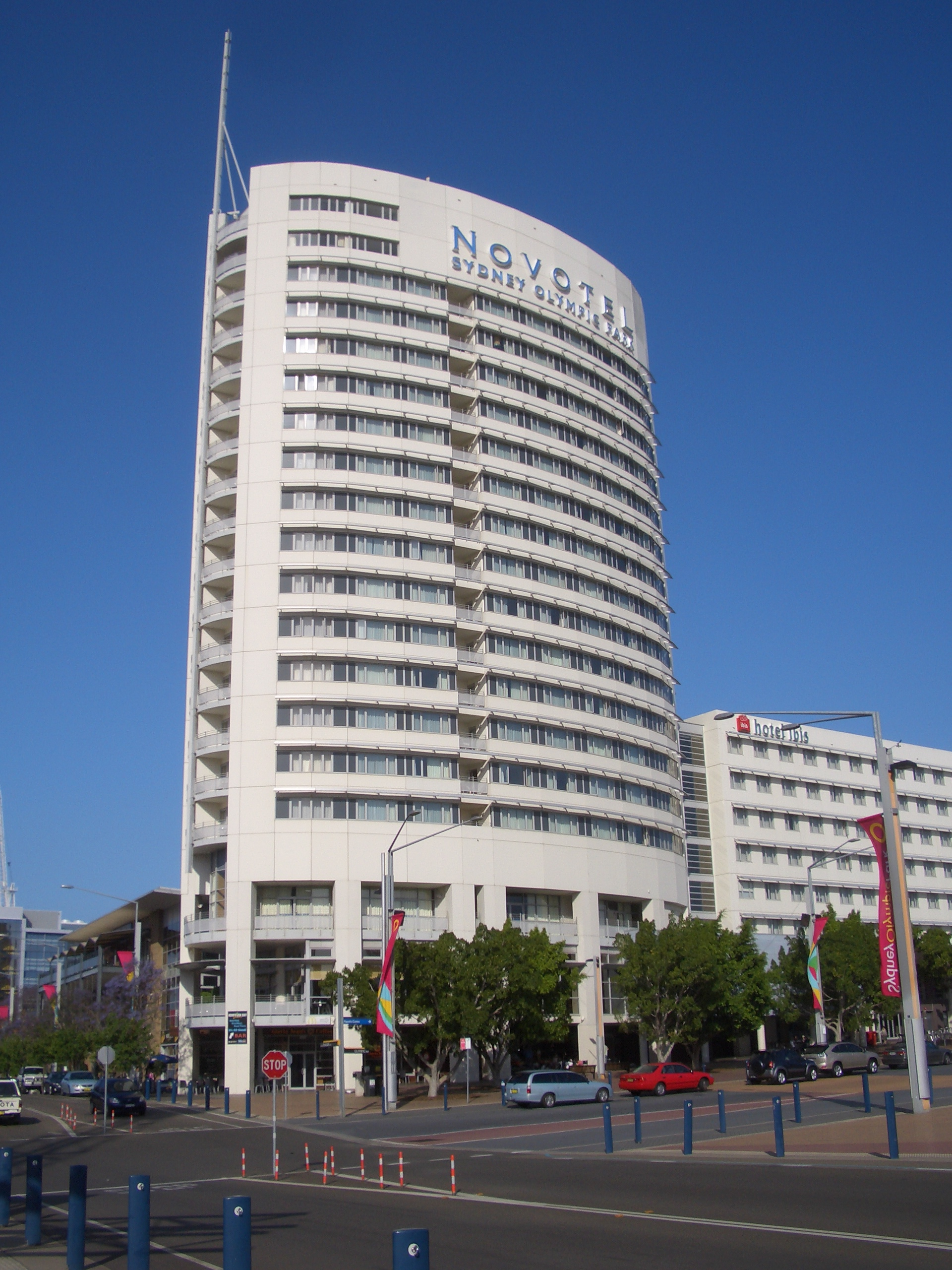
Sydney Olympic Park hotels

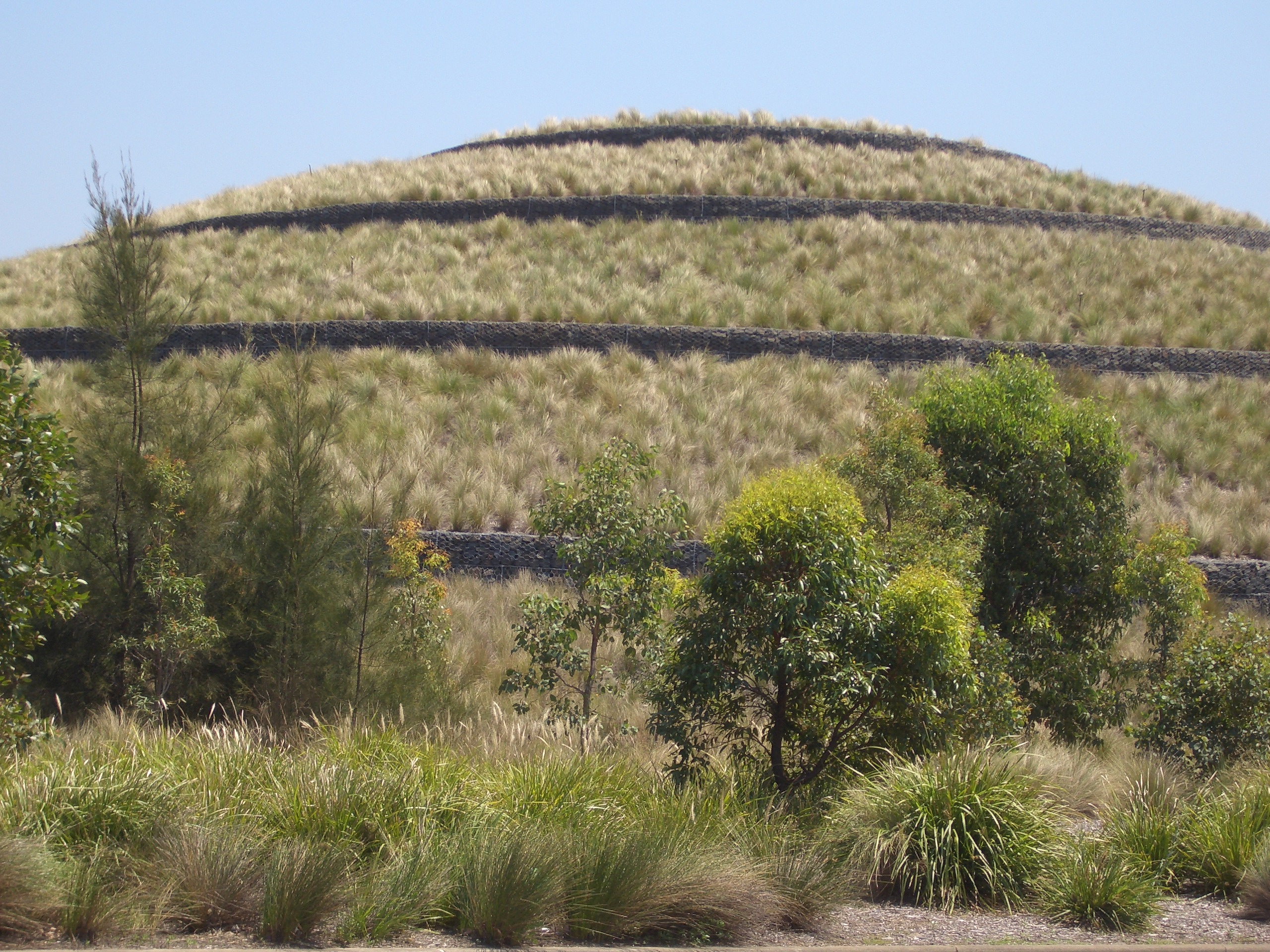
Hill Road

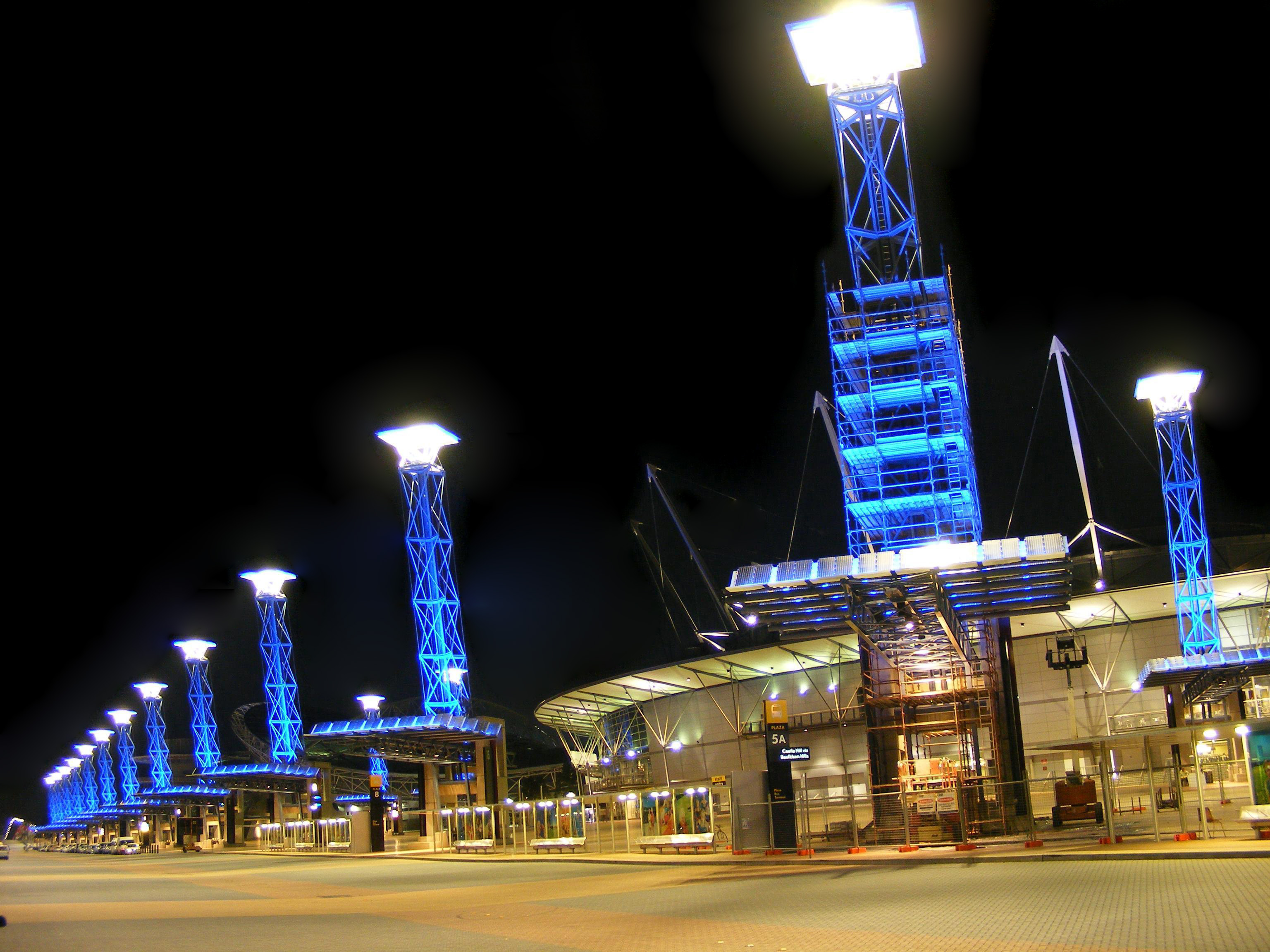
Olympic Boulevard

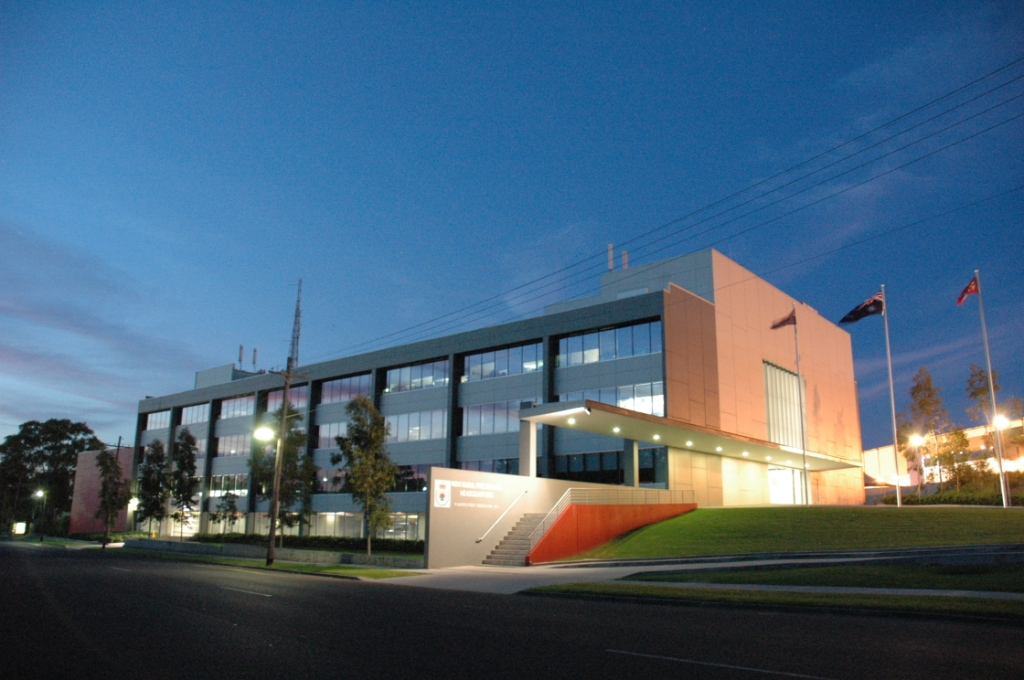
The New South Wales Rural Fire Service headquarters on Carter Street.

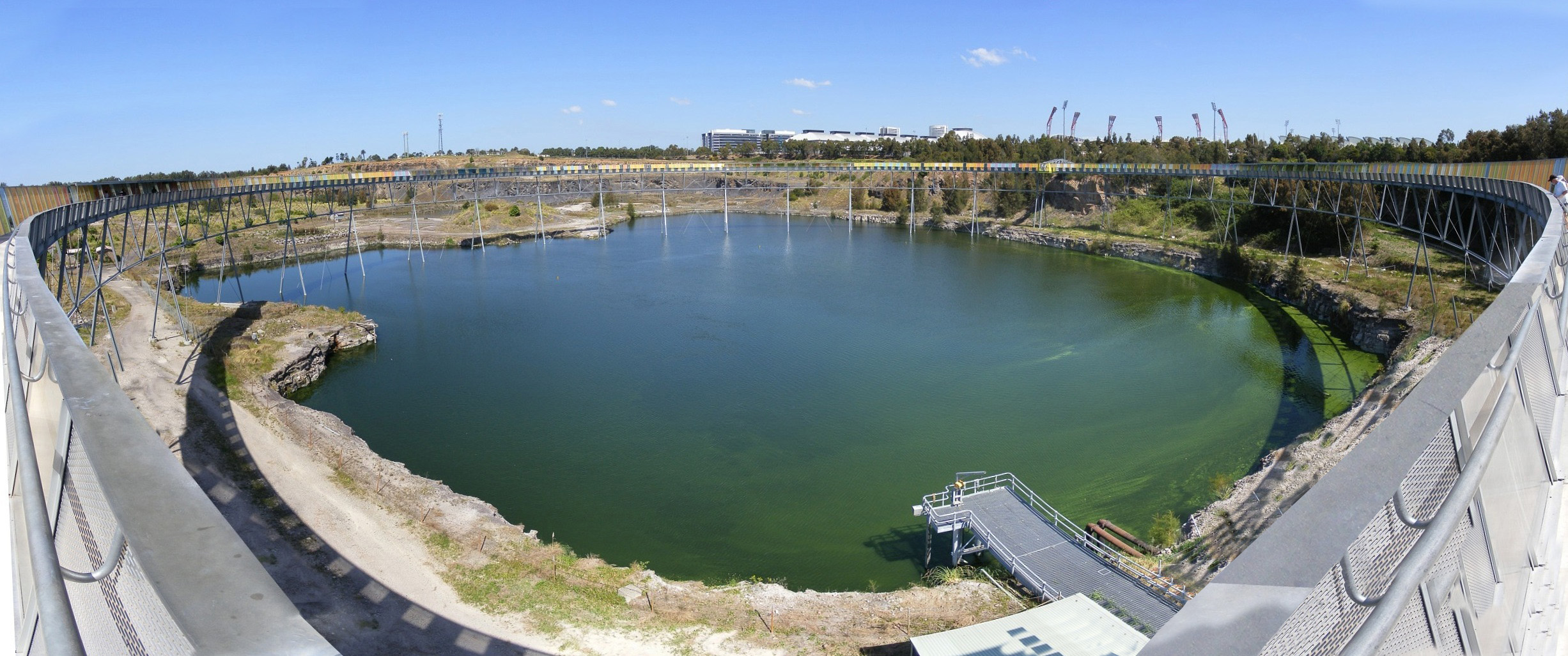
The Brickpit, former industrial site now providing wetland habitat for local fauna.

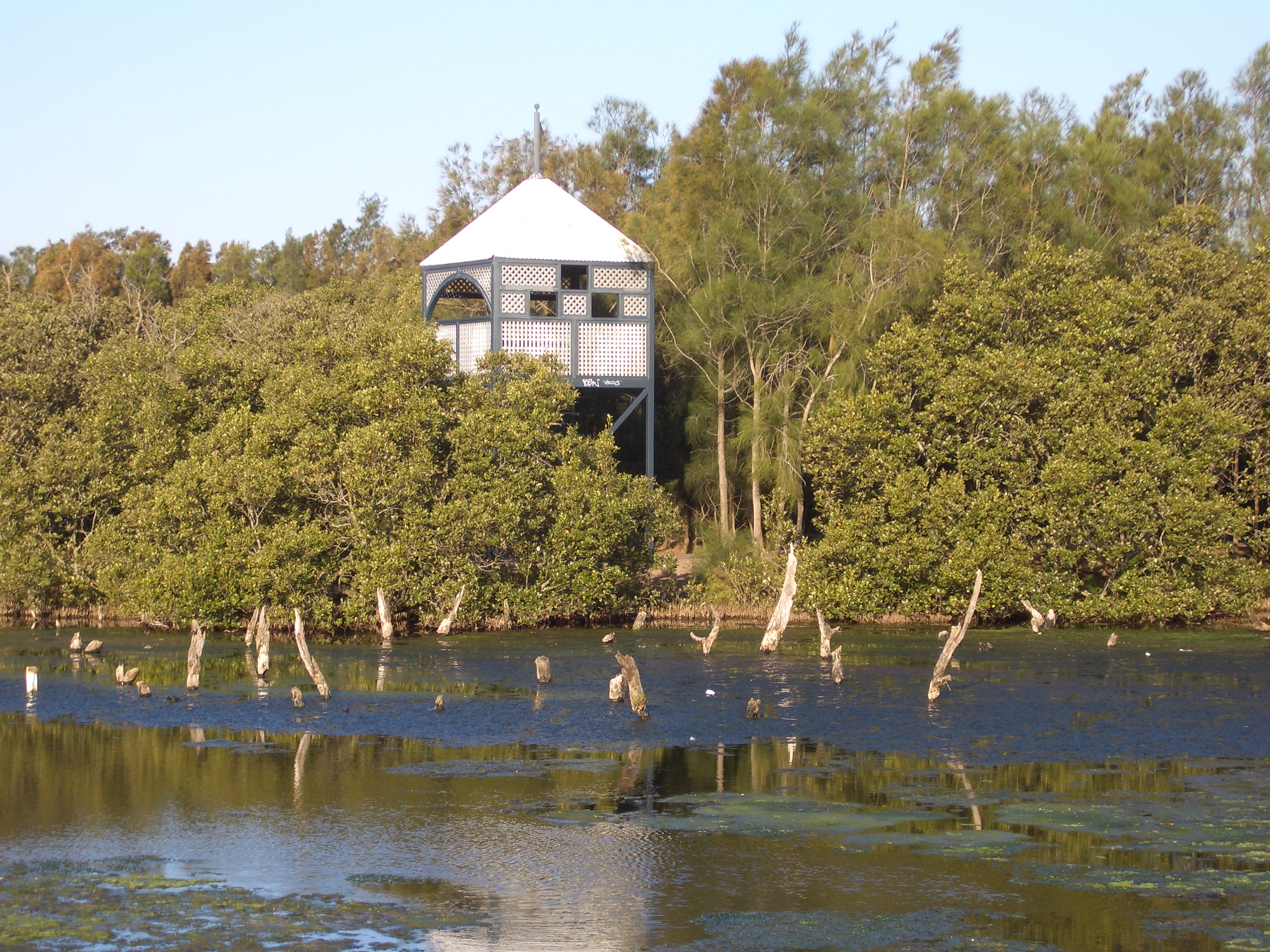
Bicentennial Park

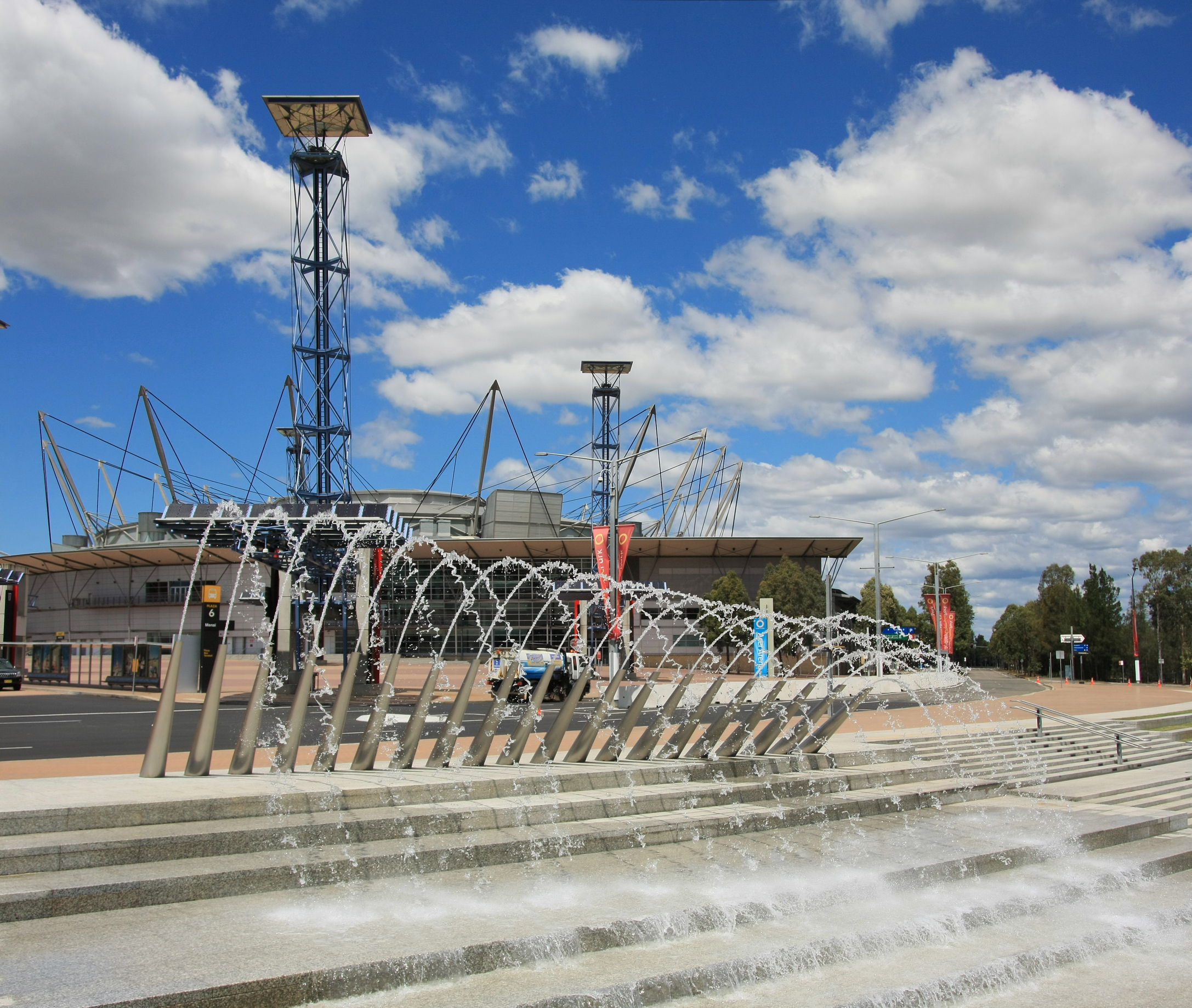
Water fountain in the Sydney Olympic Park

== See also ==
- Haslams Creek
- Powells Creek
- Sydney Olympic Park
- Homebush Bay Fault Zone
