= HMAS Karangi =

Boom defence vessel of the Royal Australian Navy

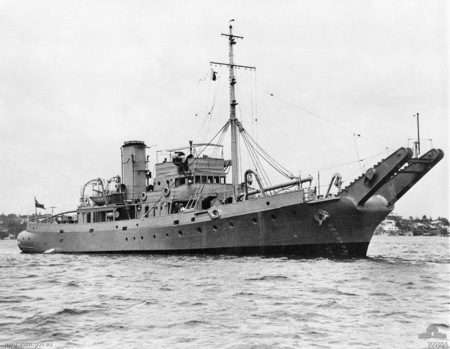
- HMAS Karangi

History

Australia
- Name: Karangi
- Namesake: Karangi, New South Wales
- Laid down: 5 February 1941
- Launched: 16 August 1941
- Commissioned: 22 December 1941
- Fate: partially scrapped, abandoned at Homebush Bay

General characteristics
- Class & type: Bar-class boom defence vessel
- Tonnage: 768 tons
- Length: 173.9 ft (53.0 m)
- Beam: 32.3 ft (9.8 m)
- Depth: 11.3 ft (3.4 m)
- Armament: 1 × 12-pounder gun; 1 × 20 mm Oerlikon cannon; 2 × .303-inch Vickers machine gun

HMAS Karangi was a Kangaroo-class boom defence vessel operated by the Royal Australian Navy (RAN) during World War II. The third of three ships constructed by the Cockatoo Docks and Engineering Company at Cockatoo Island Dockyard based on the British Bar class, Karangi was launched on 16 August 1941. After the war, the ship remained in active service with the RAN and played a small but key role in the British nuclear testing program. She was placed in reserve in 1953. In 1955, Karangi was reactivated and served for another two years until May 1957 and was eventually sold for scrap in 1966.

== Operational history ==
=== World War II ===
After commissioning, Karangi sailed from Sydney on 26 December 1941 for Darwin via Townsville. On arrival in Darwin, the ship was employed in working anti-submarine boom gates, allowing allied shipping to pass in and out of the harbour during daylight hours. On 19 February 1942, the ship was present during the Bombing of Darwin, returning fire on Japanese aircraft while escaping damage. For her role in the defence of Darwin, Karangi was awarded the battle honour "Darwin 1942–43". The ship remained assigned to boom maintenance duties in Darwin until 1944, before sailing for Fremantle where she remained until the end of the war.

=== Post-war ===
After the decommissioned Royal Netherlands Navy submarine HNLMS K XI sank in Fremantle Harbour, Karangi was used to raise the hulk as part of the salvage operation in early 1946. In 1947, the ship was tasked to search for a decommissioned naval mine that had not sunk when dumped at sea and was adrift near Rottnest Island. Initially the mine was located by Karangi and her crew unsuccessfully attempted to sink it with rifle fire. Contact was lost in darkness, with the ship continuing to search for the next three days, but unable to locate the mine a second time.

During 1950, Karangi called on a number of Western Australian ports, embarking local Navy reserve volunteers for training cruises. For many veterans of World War II, this was the first time they had been back on an active navy ship since their war service. From 9 - 27 November of that year, Karangi embarked party of four British scientists and military officers at Onslow to conduct a detailed survey of the Montebello Islands. Identified as a potential site for future nuclear weapons testing, the operation was conducted under conditions of secrecy.

In February 1951, she was dispatched to assist the amphibious landing ship HMAS Labuan, which had broken down at sea while returning from the Antarctic carrying a scientific expedition. Karangi towed Labaun, which was running low on fresh water back to Fremantle for repairs. On 7 January 1952, while alongside at Fremantle's North Wharf, a feedwater heater tank exploded in Karangi's engine room, injuring six sailors. One of those injured had been standing above decks and was struck by shrapnel receiving lacerations to his face when a skylight over the engine room shattered and was taken to the Repatriation General Hospital.

=== Operation Hurricane ===
In December 1951, the United Kingdom selected the Montebello Islands as the site of its first nuclear test, designated "Operation Hurricane", to take place before the end of 1952. In preparation for the arrival of the British task force, Karangi and sister ship HMAS Koala laid moorings and marker buoys in the islands. In April, Karangi again sailed to Onslow, accompanied by the corvette HMAS Mildura, where the two ships supported No. 5 Airfield Construction Squadron RAAF and a detachment of Royal Engineers to construct infrastructure needed for the tests. The Officer in Charge of naval operations in Western Australia recommended to the naval board that Karangi's efforts laying moorings in record time during July, without the support of a dockyard were worthy of commendation. The ship remained in the area until August, when she sailed for Sydney for refit. Karangi was not present when an atomic bomb was detonated on 3 October.

=== Return to service and Operation Mosaic ===
Now under the command of Lieutenant Commander Richard Taudevin, Karangi sailed to Williamstown Dockyard in March of 1953 following her refit. She remained there until mid-May due to issues with her engines, before arriving in Fremantle in June. In November, the ship again visited the Montebello Islands to recover equipment in proximity to Trimouille Island and the remains of HMS Plym. During this voyage Karangi's crew were fed fish from the caught in waters around the test site and were permitted to venture ashore for recreation. On her return to Fremantle, a contaminated Land Rover which had been taken ashore on Tremouille Island was offloaded and driven on public roads to HMAS Leeuwin.

Karangi continued to operate in Western Australian waters and around the Montebellos until September 1954, supporting WAPET's oil exploration activities on Barrow Island, still within the exclusion zone. The ship was then paid off into reserve, but was reactivated in April 1955. Following the announcement of further nuclear tests in Montebellos, Karangi sailed with HMAS Warrego in October 1955. Once again, during October and November the ship laid moorings and conducted surveys in preparation for the tests, designated Operation Mosaic. As part of Task Group 308.2, Karangi remained in the Montebellos and was present near the naval base camp at Onslow, approx 140 km (87 mi) away, at the time of the second Mosaic detonation.

== Decommissioning and fate ==
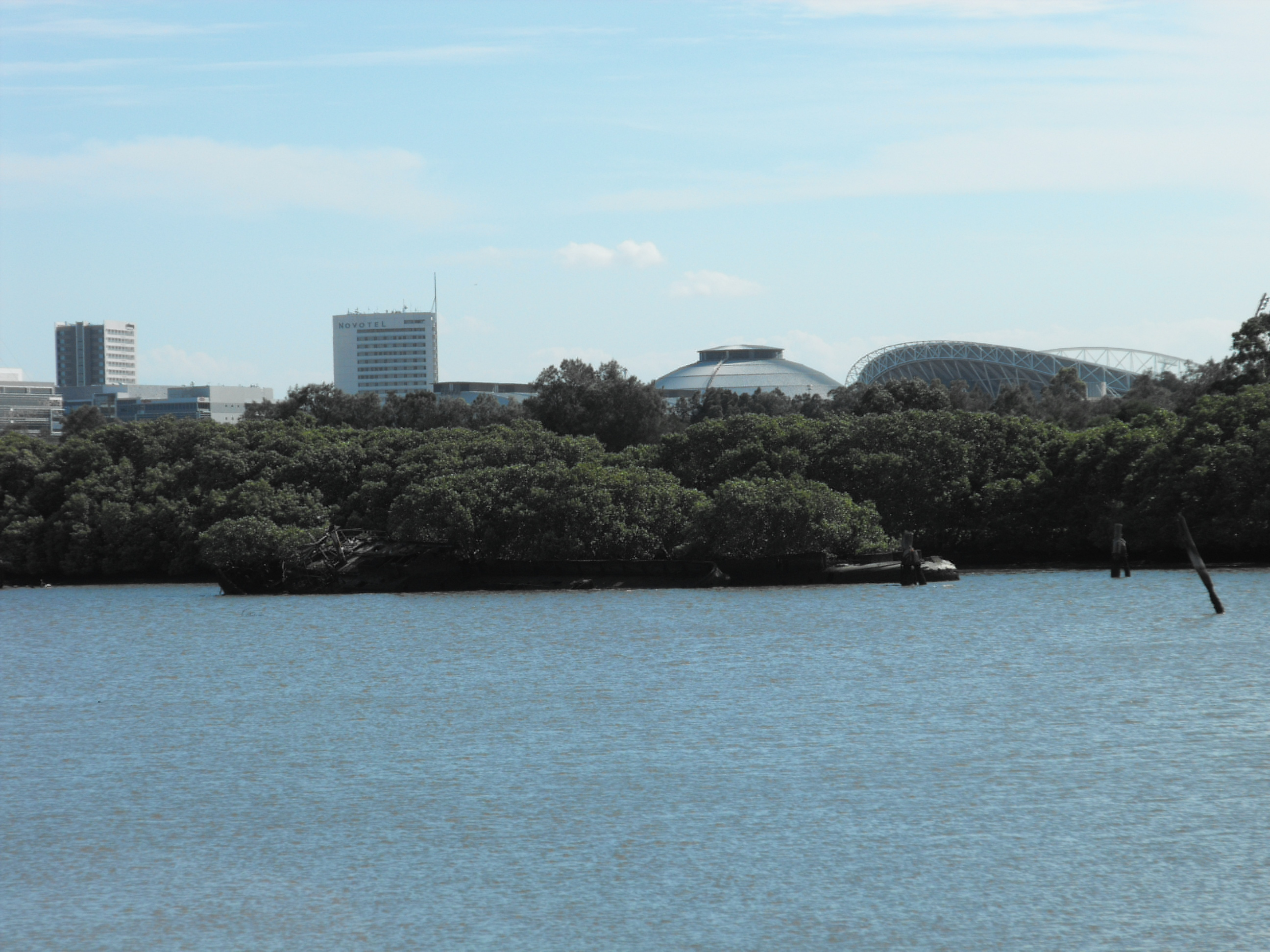
The overgrown hulk of Karangi in Homebush Bay in 2010

On 31 May 1957, Karangi was again paid off to reserve. She remained moored at Athol Bight in Sydney Harbour in an unmaintained state until being identified for disposal in 1964. She was sold on 8 September 1966 to L. Bookluck of Enmore and the superstructure was removed before the hulk was abandoned at Homebush Bay in 1970.

The hulk remains at 33.8363379°S 151.0804902°E. Formerly surrounded by industrial uses, redevelopment of the area, including the adjacent Sydney Olympic Park has seen renewed interest in the remains of Karangi and other vessels in the bay, such as the SS Ayrfield, as a minor tourist attraction and popular location for photography.
