= Wilsonia backhousei =

Scientific classification
- Kingdom: Plantae
- Clade: Tracheophytes
- Clade: Angiosperms
- Clade: Eudicots
- Clade: Asterids
- Order: Solanales
- Family: Convolvulaceae
- Genus: Wilsonia
- Species: W. backhousei

Binomial name
- Wilsonia backhousei Hook.f.

Species of plant

Wilsonia backhousei is a species of plant native to Australia. It is found in the states of Western Australia, South Australia, Victoria, New South Wales and Tasmania. The genus was named after English botanist John Wilson by Scottish Robert Brown, and the species was named after English nurseryman and botanical collector James Backhouse by British botanist Joseph Dalton Hooker.
