= Haslams Creek =

River in New South Wales, Australia

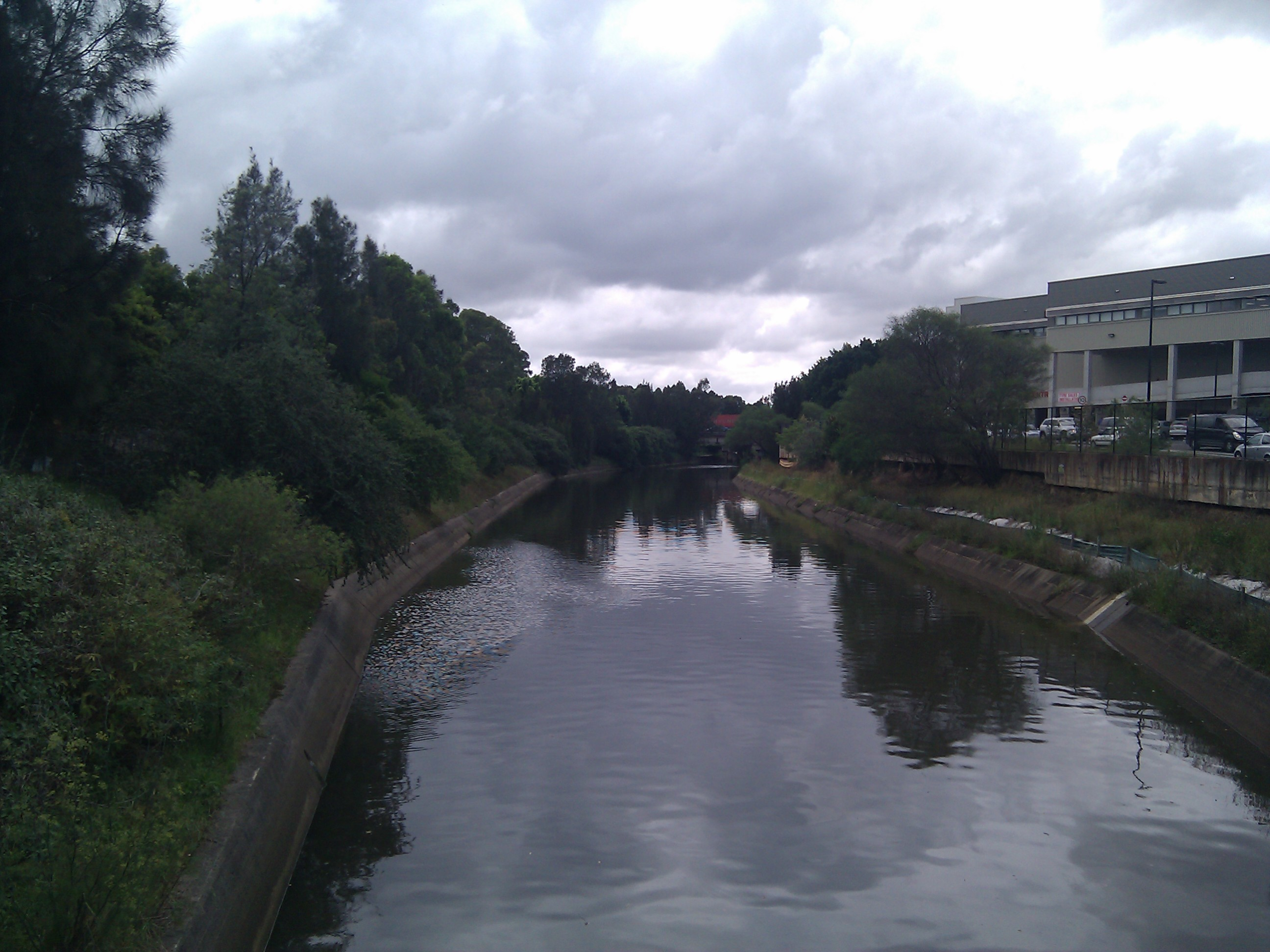
- View of the creek from the bridge

Location
- Country: Australia
- Municipality: Sydney

Physical characteristics
- Source: Rookwood Cemetery
  - location: Rookwood
  - coordinates: 33°52′27.006″S 151°3′33.2994″E
- Source confluence: Haslams Creek Wetland
  - location: Homebush Bay
  - coordinates: 33°50′9.5994″S 151°4′39.7194″E
- Mouth: Parramatta River
  - location: Homebush Bay
  - coordinates: 33°50′4.0194″S 151°4′34.68″E

Basin features
- River system: Parramatta River

Haslams Creek, a southern tributary of the Parramatta River, is a creek west of Sydney Harbour, located in Sydney, Australia. It flows through Sydney Olympic Park and joins Parramatta River at Homebush Bay. In 1793, the first grants were made to free settlers, with Samuel Haslam receiving his first grant in 1806. A 50 acre grant north of Parramatta Road, the first grant, was followed by a second small grant south of Parramatta Road and east of Haslams Creek. Haslams Creek flowed through the holdings of the Sydney Meat Preserving Company Ltd 1876-1965, which at one point dammed the creek. When opened, Lidcombe railway station actually bore the name Haslams Creek Station

== Ecology ==
The source of the creek is in the suburb of Rookwood. The Haslams Creek catchment area is 17 square kilometres (6.6 sq mi).

The Lower Haslams Creek catchment is located between Homebush Bay and the M4 Freeway. The Upper Haslams Creek catchment covers an area from the M4 Freeway to Rookwood Cemetery, and this catchment is highly urbanised. The channel system in the upstream catchment consists of both lined open channels and pipes. The formalised channel in the downstream catchment extends from the M4 Freeway to the Hill Road Bridge. The natural channel downstream of Hill Road extends to Homebush Bay. The formalised channel is owned by Sydney Water, while the natural channel is the responsibility of the NSW Roads and Maritime Services.

The tidal limit of Haslams Creek is located 350 metres (1,150 ft) upstream of the Great Western Highway. The mangrove limit is located 100 metres (330 ft) downstream of the freeway. The wreck of SS Ayrfield, located near the mouth of the creek, has a mangrove forest growing on its decks.

Haslams Creek Wetland, bounded in the south by Bennelong Parkway and to the north by Homebush Bay, was a pilot site for part of a large-scale remediation strategy for the Sydney Olympics 2000 site. The New South Wales Olympic Coordination Authority commissioned the restoration of two saline wetlands in Homebush Bay: one in the suburb of North Newington, the other at Haslams Creek. Modifications were made to the site's hydrology and sedimentation dynamics, and then cuttings of six species from nearby donor sites were transplanted along a gradient. During the subsequent 2-year monitoring period, growth and survival rates were documented in an effort to better understand the effects of salinity, sedimentation, and tidal influence on the species' survival, and to predict patterns of colonisation and zonation in the recreated saltmarsh systems.

== Structures ==
Haslams Creek Bridge, listed on the New South Wales Heritage and conservation register, constructed circa 1928, is a single span reinforced concrete bridge located at Lidcombe, crossing Parramatta Road (also called the Great Western Highway). The bridge and its adjacent culvert, still in current use, are historically significant in that the bridge's construction enabled the extension of Parramatta Road in a straight line and helped fuel industrial growth in the suburbs of Auburn, Clyde, Granville and Parramatta, and beyond.

== See also ==
- Powells Creek
- Saleyards Creek
