= Hexam Terrace =

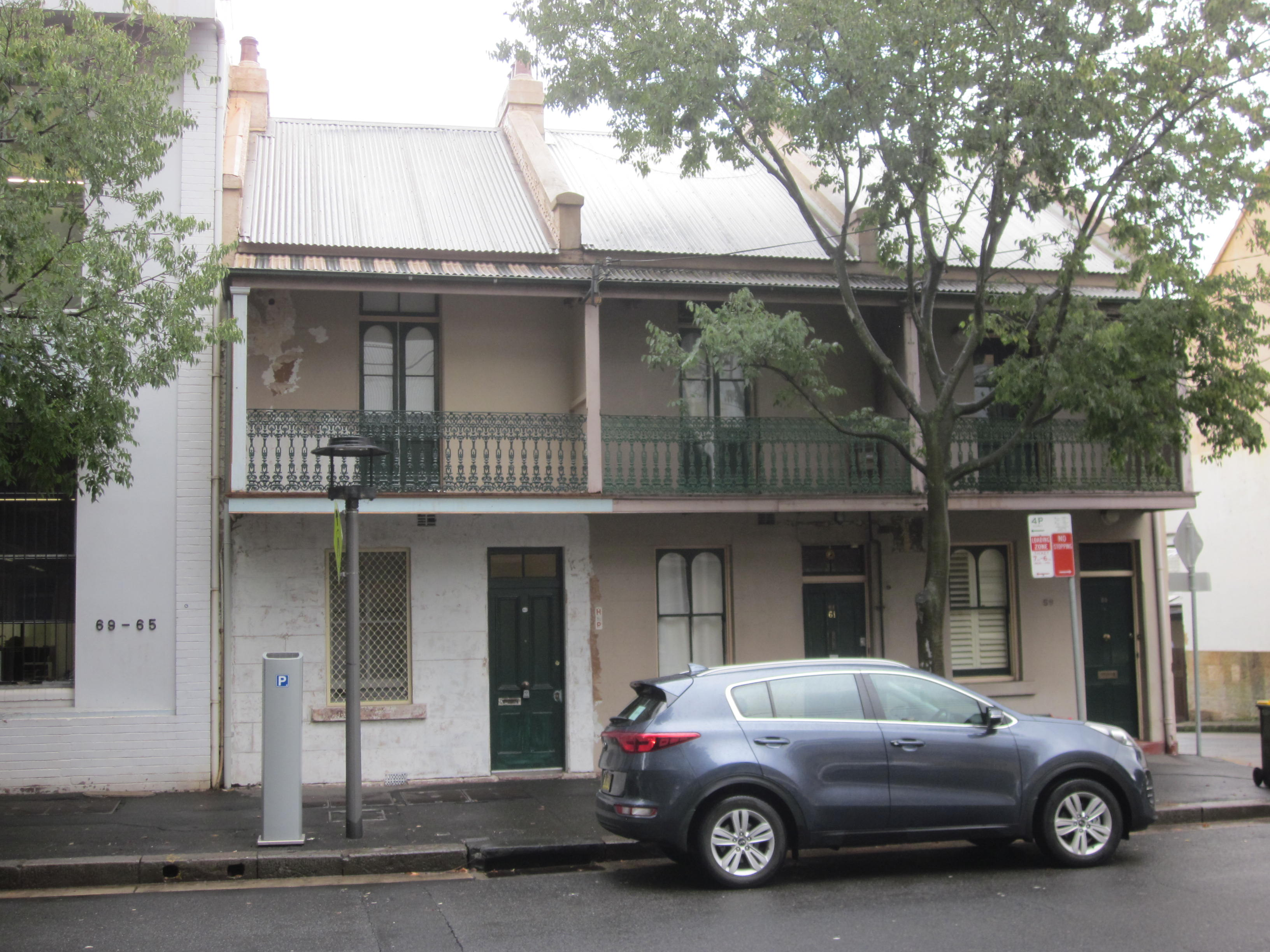
- Hexam Terrace, 59–63 Kent Street, Millers Point, NSW

- Location within Sydney Location within Australia
- 33.8594°S 151.2034°E
- Location: 59, 61, 63 Kent Street, Millers Point, City of Sydney, New South Wales, Australia

Site notes
- Architectural style: Victorian

New South Wales Heritage Register
- Official name: Hexam Terrace
- Type: State heritage (built)
- Designated: 2 April 1999
- Reference no.: 872
- Type: Terrace
- Category: Residential buildings (private)

Hexam Terrace is a heritage-listed residence at 59–63 Kent Street, in the inner city Sydney suburb of Millers Point in the City of Sydney local government area of New South Wales, Australia. The property was added to the New South Wales State Heritage Register on 2 April 1999.

== History ==
Millers Point is one of the earliest areas of European settlement in Australia, and a focus for maritime activities. This terrace is one of three simply detailed Victorian terraces constructed of painted rendered masonry, with cantilevered cast iron bracketed balcony. First tenanted by the NSW Department of Housing in 1986.

== Description ==
Simple, two storey Victorian stuccoed terrace having arched top sash windows, fanlights above doorways at entrance and above french door to a cantilevered cast iron balcony structure. This residence has two bedrooms. Storeys: Two; Construction: Rendered masonry walls and chimney, corrigated galvanised iron roof. Cantilivered cast iron bracketed balconies. Style: Victorian.

The external condition of the property is good.

== Heritage listing ==
As at 23 November 2000, this residence is one of three Victorian two storey terraces forming an important streetscape element.

It is part of the Millers Point Conservation Area, an intact residential and maritime precinct. It contains residential buildings and civic spaces dating from the 1830s and is an important example of C19th adaptation of the landscape.

Hexam Terrace was listed on the New South Wales State Heritage Register on 2 April 1999.

== See also ==
- Australian residential architectural styles
