= Merriman Street Terraces =

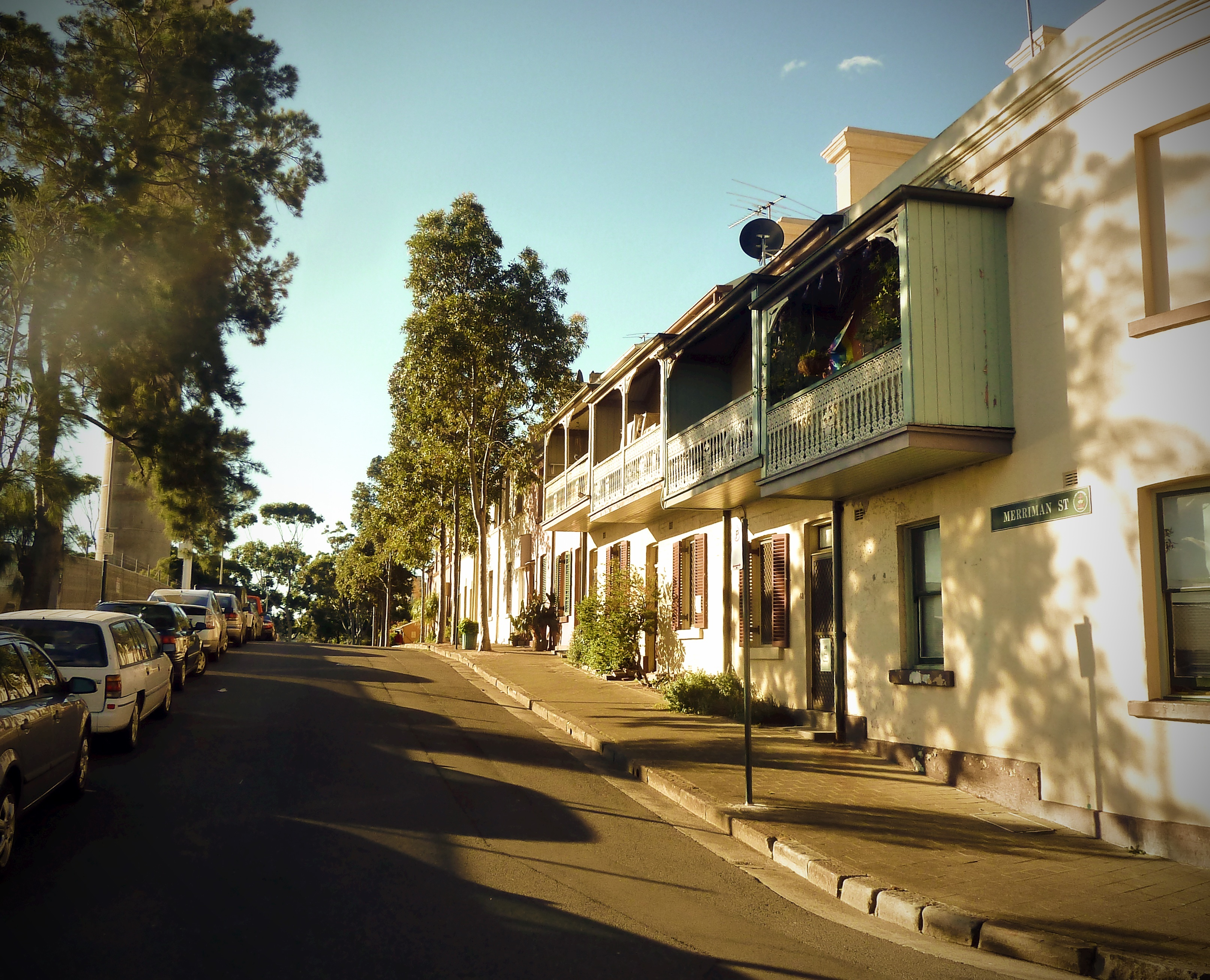
- From 48 Merriman Street (front right); No. 20 is extreme centre, pictured in 2013

- Location within Sydney Location within Australia
- 33.8575°S 151.2020°E
- Location: 20–48 Merriman Street, Millers Point, City of Sydney, New South Wales, Australia

Site notes
- Architectural style: Victorian Georgian

New South Wales Heritage Register
- Official name: Merriman Street Terraces; Davies Terrace (part of)
- Type: State heritage (complex / group)
- Designated: 2 April 1999
- Reference no.: 903
- Type: Terrace
- Category: Residential buildings (private)

The Merriman Street Terraces are heritage-listed terrace houses located at 20–48 Merriman Street, in the inner city Sydney suburb of Millers Point in the City of Sydney local government area of New South Wales, Australia. It is also known as (part of) Davies Terrace. The property was added to the New South Wales State Heritage Register on 2 April 1999.

== History ==
Millers Point is one of the earliest areas of European settlement in Australia, and a focus for maritime activities. Merriman Street contains a substantial collection of Georgian style houses and terraces.

== Description ==
The Merriman Street terraces are all Georgian style Victorian terraces.

The external condition of the property is good.

== Heritage listing ==
Merriman Street contains housing groups of the utmost historical importance.

It is part of the Millers Point Conservation Area, an intact residential and maritime precinct. It contains residential buildings and civic spaces dating from the 1830s and is an important example of C19th adaptation of the landscape.

Merriman Street Terraces was listed on the New South Wales State Heritage Register on 2 April 1999.

== See also ==
- Australian residential architectural styles
