= 71–73 Kent Street, Millers Point =

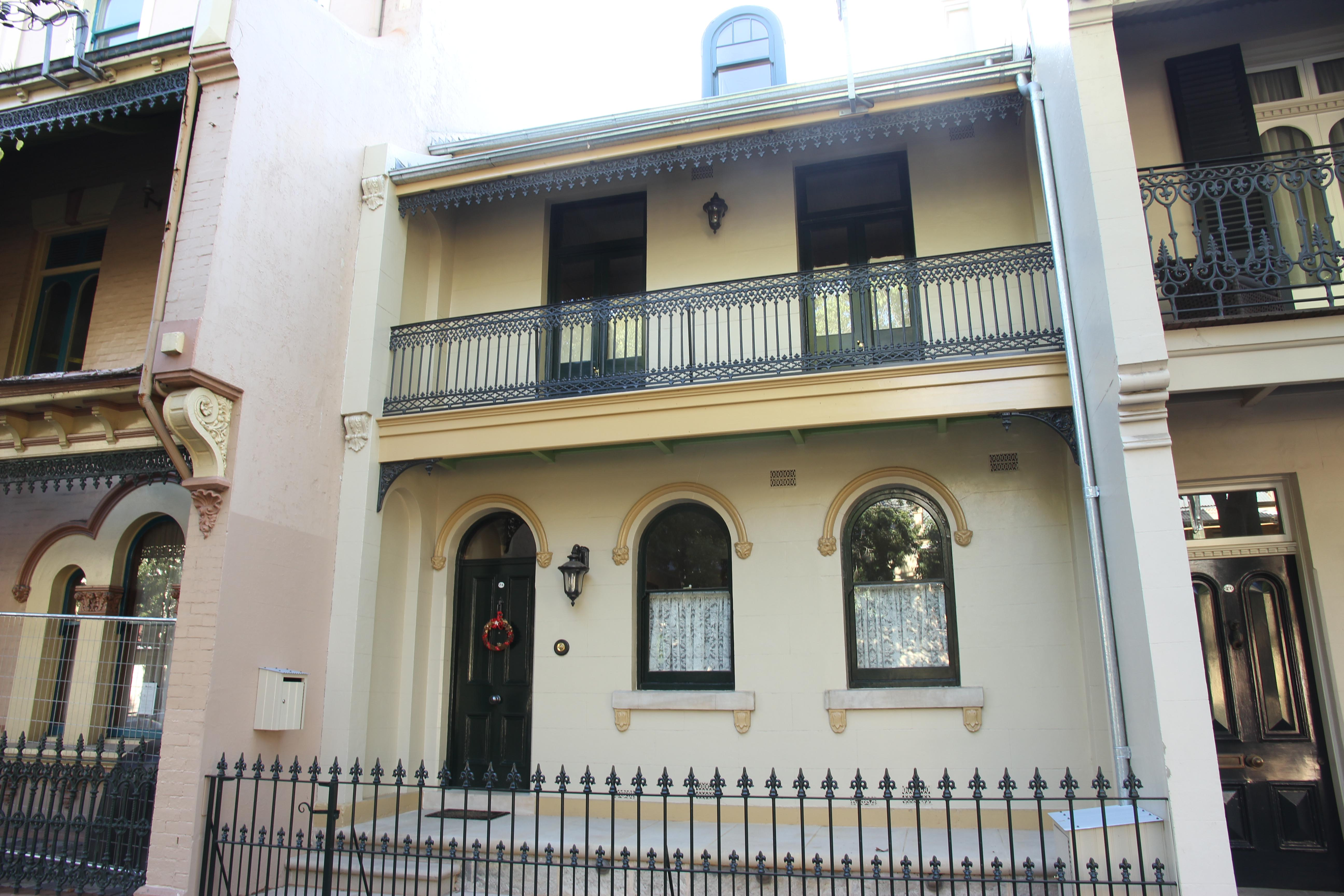
- 73 Kent Street, pictured in 2019.

- Location within Sydney Location within Australia
- 33.8597°S 151.2034°E
- Location: 71, 73 Kent Street, Millers Point, City of Sydney, New South Wales, Australia

History
- Built: c. 1864

Site notes
- Architectural style: Victorian Italianate

New South Wales Heritage Register
- Official name: Terrace
- Type: State heritage (built)
- Designated: 2 April 1999
- Reference no.: 914
- Type: Terrace
- Category: Residential buildings (private)

71–73 Kent Street, Millers Point are heritage-listed terrace houses located at 71–73 Kent Street, in the inner city Sydney suburb of Millers Point in the City of Sydney local government area of New South Wales, Australia. The property was added to the New South Wales State Heritage Register on 2 April 1999.

== History ==
Millers Point is one of the earliest areas of European settlement in Australia, and a focus for maritime activities. This building was constructed c. 1864 and kept in good condition. Renovations c. 1987 converted the building to four one-bedroom units. First tenanted by the NSW Department of Housing in 1988.

== Description ==
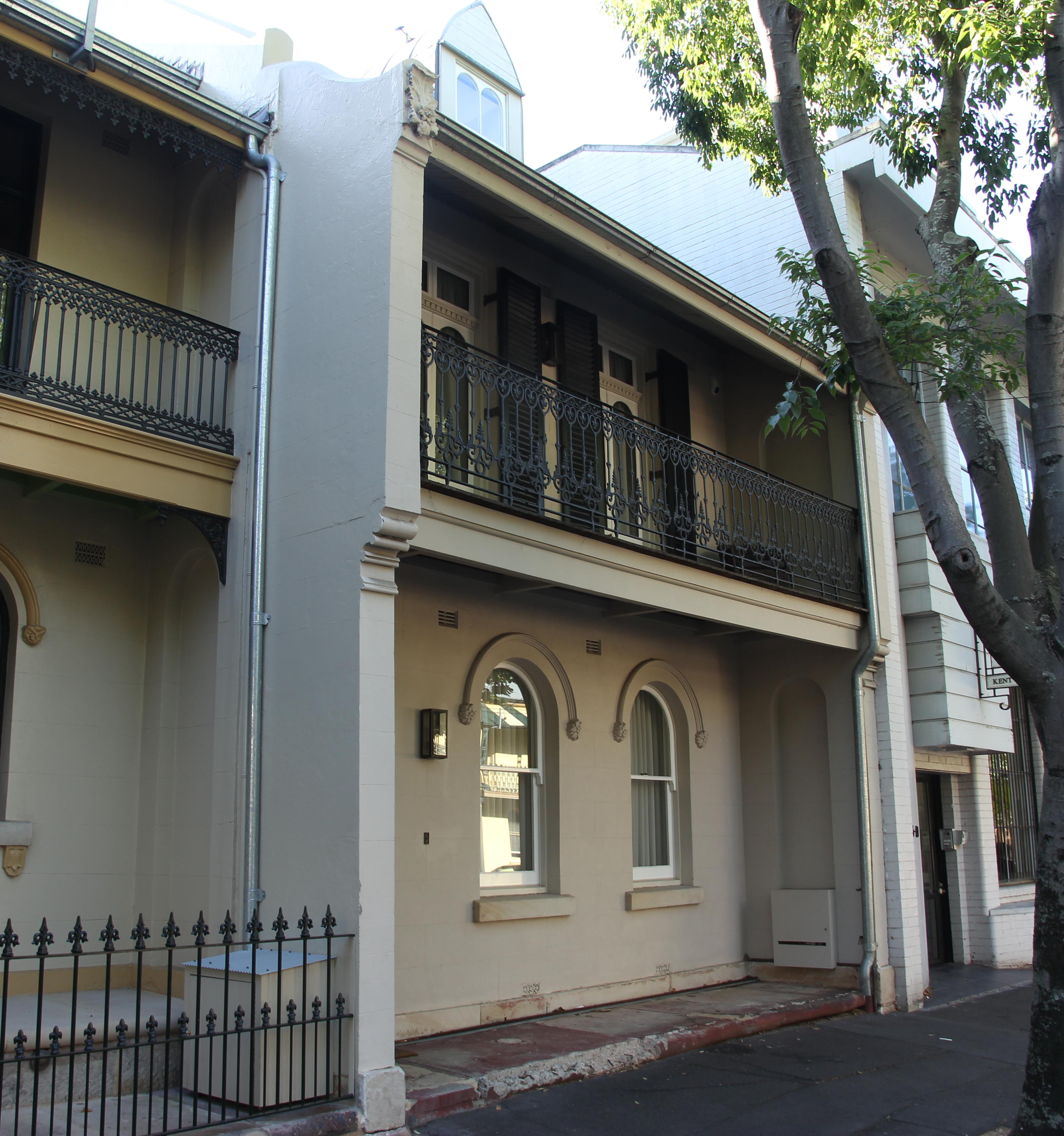
71 Kent Street, pictured in 2019.

A well proportioned Victorian house, some Italianate features. In almost intact condition this building now contains four 1 bedroom units. Storeys: Two; Construction: Painted rendered masonry walls, slate roof to main body of house, corrigated galvanised iron to balcony verandah, and rear wing. Cast iron balcony lace. Style: Victorian Italianate.

The external condition of the property is good.

== Heritage listing ==
As at 23 November 2000, this residence is an important streetscape element.

It is part of the Millers Point Conservation Area, an intact residential and maritime precinct. It contains residential buildings and civic spaces dating from the 1830s and is an important example of 19th century adaptation of the landscape.

71–73 Kent Street, Millers Point was listed on the New South Wales State Heritage Register on 2 April 1999.

== See also ==
- Australian residential architectural styles
