= 83–85 Kent Street, Millers Point =

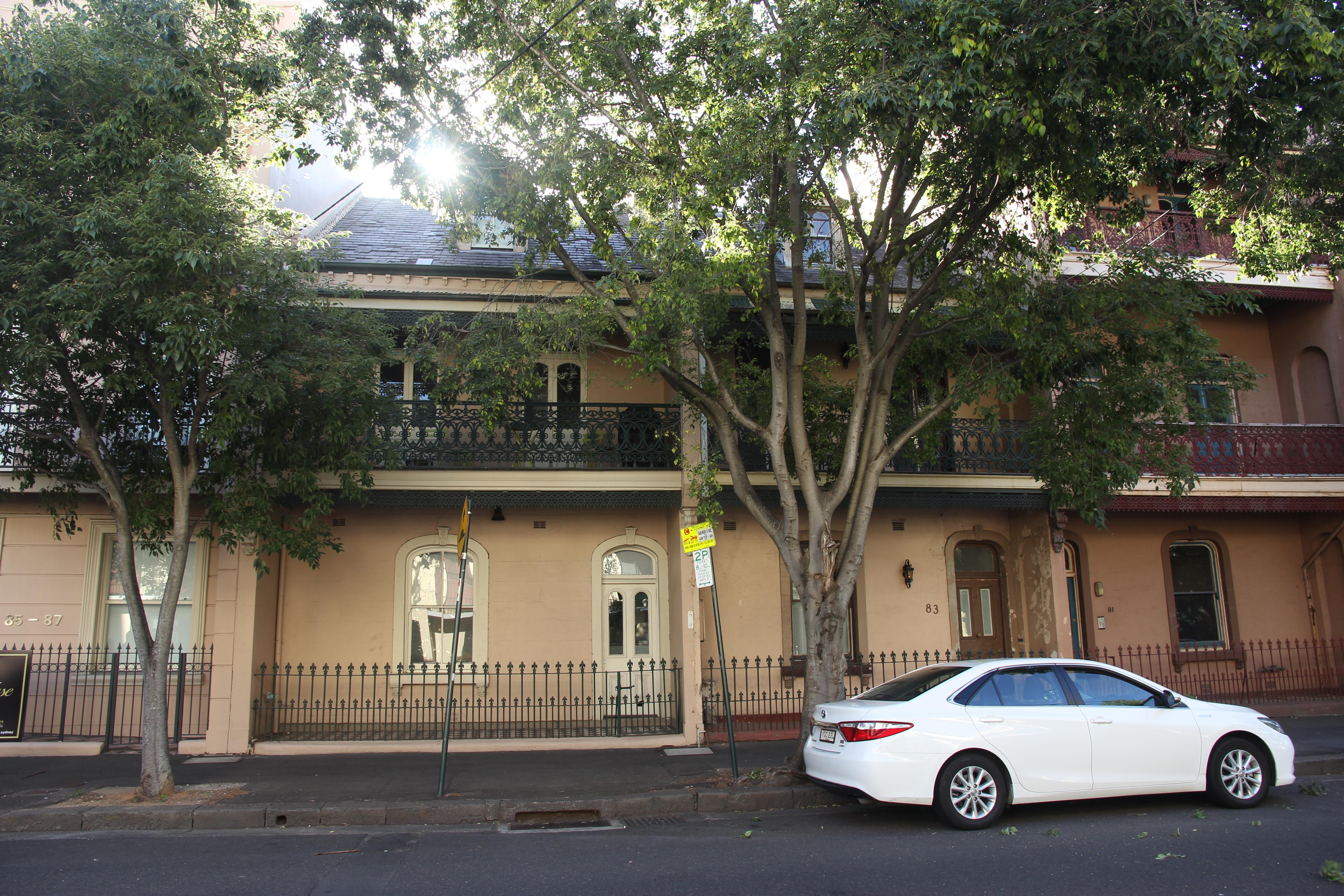
- 83–85 Kent Street, pictured in 2019.

- Location within Sydney Location within Australia
- 33.8600°S 151.2034°E
- Location: 83, 85 Kent Street, Millers Point, City of Sydney, New South Wales, Australia

Site notes
- Architectural style: Victorian Italianate

New South Wales Heritage Register
- Official name: Terrace
- Type: State heritage (built)
- Designated: 2 April 1999
- Reference no.: 879
- Type: Terrace
- Category: Residential buildings (private)

83–85 Kent Street, Millers Point is a heritage-listed former residence and now boarding house located at 83–85 Kent Street, in the inner city Sydney suburb of Millers Point in the City of Sydney local government area of New South Wales, Australia. The property is privately owned and was added to the New South Wales State Heritage Register on 2 April 1999.

== History ==
Millers Point is one of the earliest areas of European settlement in Australia, and a focus for maritime activities. This boarding house was first tenanted by the NSW Department of Housing in 1984.

== Description ==
One of a pair of two storey with attic rooms and dormer windows. This boarding house contains five bedrooms. It has a curved roofed dormer window, decorative iron lace and frieze to balcony and spear fence balustrade to ground floor. Storeys: Two; Construction: Painted rendered masonry walls, slate roof to main body of house corrigated galvanised iron to balcony roof and rear wing. Decorative iron lace. Painted timber joinery. Style: Victorian Italianate.

The external condition of the property is good.

== Heritage listing ==
As at 23 November 2000, this is one of a pair of two storey Victorian terraces in good condition.

It is part of the Millers Point Conservation Area, an intact residential and maritime precinct. It contains residential buildings and civic spaces dating from the 1830s and is an important example of 19th century adaptation of the landscape.

83–85 Kent Street, Millers Point was listed on the New South Wales State Heritage Register on 2 April 1999.

== See also ==
- Australian residential architectural styles
