= 2–36 High Street, Millers Point =

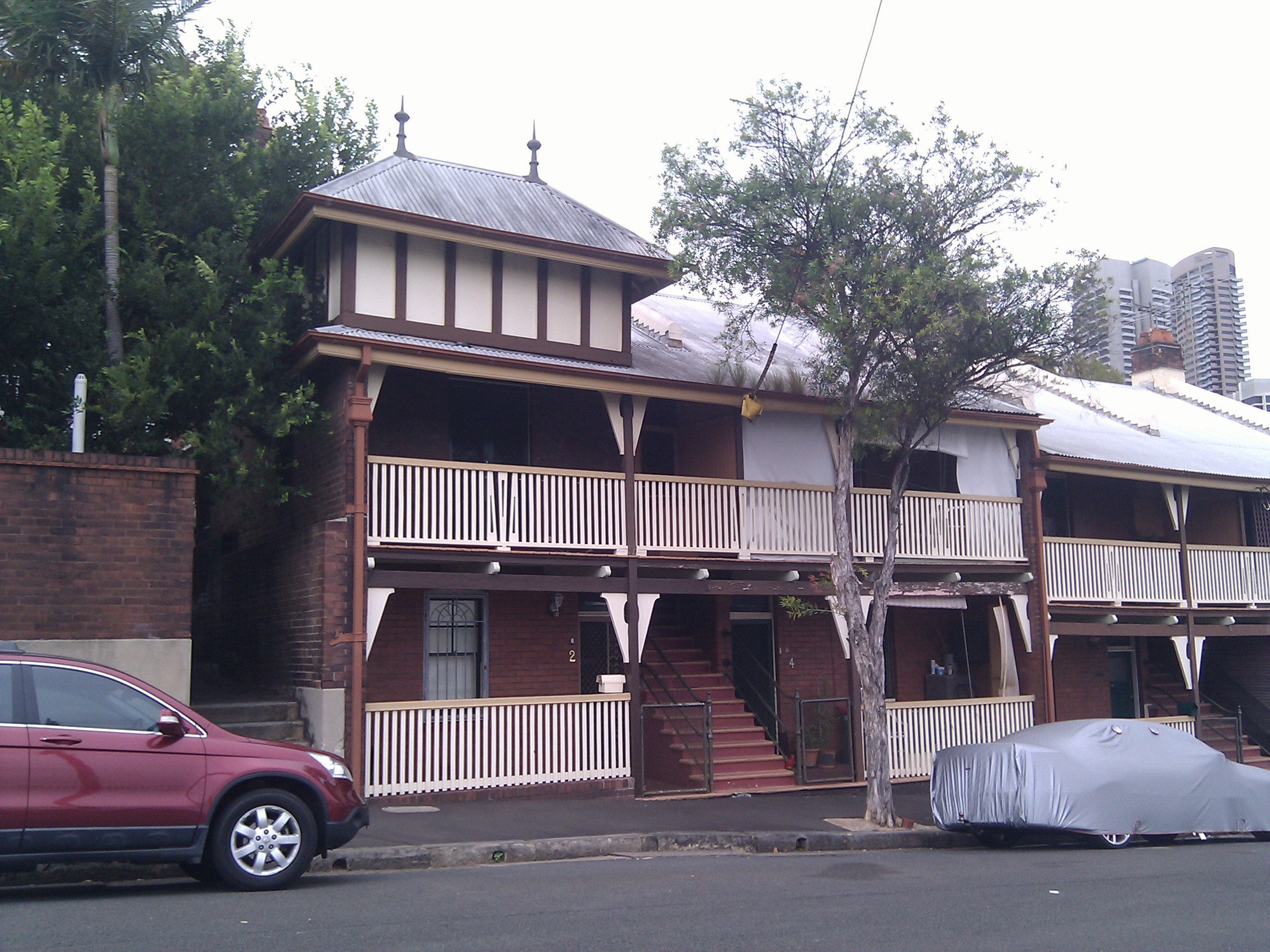
- 2-8 High Street terraces, pictured in 2012.

- Location within Sydney Location within Australia
- 33.8591°S 151.2030°E
- Location: 2–36 High Street, Millers Point, City of Sydney, New South Wales, Australia

History
- Built: c. 1911

Site notes
- Architectural style: Federation

New South Wales Heritage Register
- Official name: Terrace Duplexes
- Type: State heritage (built)
- Designated: 2 April 1999
- Reference no.: 920
- Type: Historic site

2–36 High Street, Millers Point are heritage-listed terrace houses located at 2–36 High Street, in the inner city Sydney suburb of Millers Point in the City of Sydney local government area of New South Wales, Australia. The property was added to the New South Wales State Heritage Register on 2 April 1999.

== History ==
Millers Point is one of the earliest areas of European settlement in Australia, and a focus for maritime activities. These are a group of early twentieth century workman's terraces built c. 1911 as part of the post bubonic plague redevelopment by the Sydney Harbour Trust. First tenanted by the NSW Department of Housing in 1986.

== Description ==
These large terraces feature elaborate timber verandahs with ornamental brackets in the Federation style. Usually, accommodation consists of either two or three bedroom units on both the ground and first floors. Access to the first floor is shared by two units via stairs off the street. To either side of the stairwell are the entrances to the lower units. Storeys: Two; Construction: Face brick walls, tiled roof, some corrugated galvanised iron, chimneys, timber verandahs. Painted timber joinery. Style: Federation.

The external condition of the property is good.

== Heritage listing ==
As at 23 November 2000, this terrace is one of a group of early twentieth century workmen's terraces built as part of the post plague redevelopment by the Sydney Harbour Trust.

It is part of the Millers Point Conservation Area, an intact residential and maritime precinct. It contains residential buildings and civic spaces dating from the 1830s and is an important example of 19th century adaptation of the landscape.

2–36 High Street, Millers Point was listed on the New South Wales State Heritage Register on 2 April 1999.

== See also ==
- Australian residential architectural styles
