= House of Bodleigh =

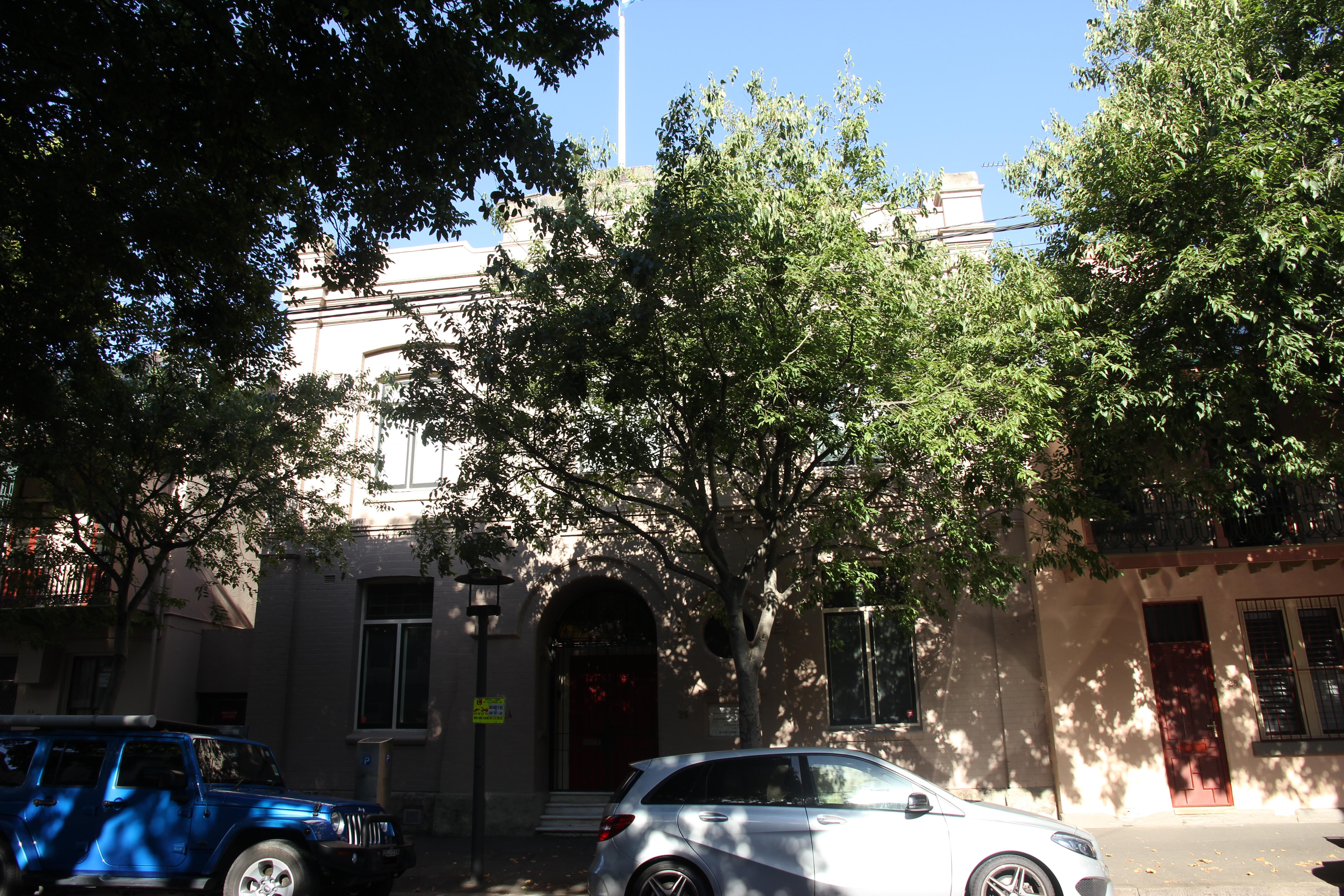
- 24 Kent Street, pictured in 2019

- Location within Sydney Location within Australia
- 33.8589°S 151.2038°E
- Location: 24, 26 Kent Street, Millers Point, City of Sydney, New South Wales, Australia

History
- Built: c. 1900

Site notes
- Architectural style: Federation

New South Wales Heritage Register
- Official name: House of Bodleigh; Rawson Hall
- Type: State heritage (built)
- Designated: 2 April 1999
- Reference no.: 873
- Type: House
- Category: Residential buildings (private)

The House of Bodleigh is a heritage-listed former hall located at 24–26 Kent Street, in the inner city Sydney suburb of Millers Point in the City of Sydney, local government area of New South Wales, Australia. It is called Rawson Hall. There, the House of Bodleigh does not appear on the foundation stone on the front of the building. The property was added to the New South Wales State Heritage Register on 2 April 1999.

== History ==
Millers Point is one of the earliest areas of European settlement in Australia, and a focus for maritime activities. The building was constructed in 1900 on vacant land between rows of 1860s terrace housing.

== Description ==
It is a two-storey face brick Federation building used as offices. Arched entry to doorway, fanlights over lower door and windows, with the roof concealing pediment. The materials made for constructing are Brick and stone walls. It has a corrugated galvanised iron roof.

=== Modifications and dates ===
The external are painted brick on top storey. Its fenestration changed. The building was last inspected on 21 February 1995. Important interiors concealed by later infill.

== Heritage listing ==
As of 23 November 2000, It is a unique two-storey brick building, a former hall now used as offices. It has a strong brick and stone character presenting solidly to the street.

It is part of the Millers Point Conservation Area, an intact residential and maritime precinct. It contains residential buildings and civic spaces dating from the 1830s and is an important example of 19th century adaptation of the landscape.

The House of Bodleigh was listed on the New South Wales State Heritage Register on 2 April 1999.

== See also ==
- Australian residential architectural styles
