= 30 Kent Street, Millers Point =

Partial view

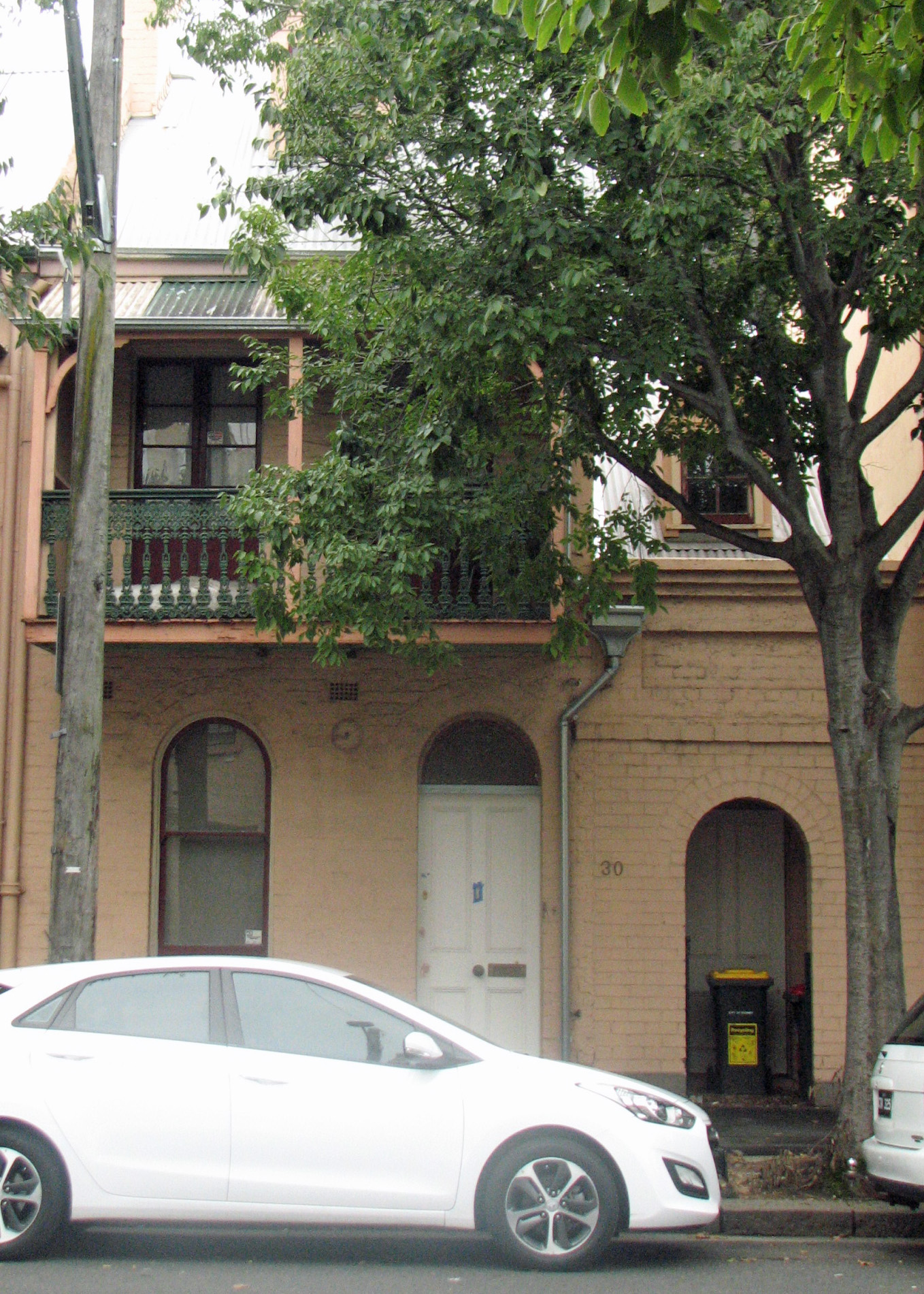
- 30 Kent Street, Millers Point, NSW

- Location within Sydney Location within Australia
- 33.8591°S 151.2038°E
- Location: 30 Kent Street, Millers Point, City of Sydney, New South Wales, Australia

Site notes
- Architectural style: Victorian Filigree

New South Wales Heritage Register
- Official name: Building
- Type: State heritage (built)
- Designated: 2 April 1999
- Reference no.: 855
- Type: Historic site

30 Kent Street, Millers Point is a heritage-listed former retail building and now commercial building located at 30 Kent Street, in the inner city Sydney suburb of Millers Point in the City of Sydney local government area of New South Wales, Australia. The property was added to the New South Wales State Heritage Register on 2 April 1999.

== History ==
Millers Point is one of the earliest areas of European settlement in Australia, and a focus for maritime activities. Terrace housing built during the 1860s. First tenanted 1982. Interesting two-storey terrace with attic and single storey Victorian shop. An infill element between adjoining two-storey terrace groups. Together a charming group, significant streetscape element.

== Description ==
Two-storey terrace with small single storey Victorian shop, later infill between adjoining early Victorian terraces. Terrace features cantilevered balcony over footpath, a corrugated iron verandah, french door on upper storey, panelled front door with fanlight and a sash window with slab sill on ground floor Storeys: Two; Construction: Painted brickwork. Corrigated galvanised iron roof. Painted joinery. Style: Victorian Filigree.

The external condition of the property is good.

=== Modifications and dates ===
External: Joinery to old shop front. Last inspected: 21 February 1995.

== Heritage listing ==
As at 23 November 2000, representative of early commercial activity in the area. Forms part of a cohesive streetscape element.

It is part of the Millers Point Conservation Area, an intact residential and maritime precinct. It contains residential buildings and civic spaces dating from the 1830s and is an important example of 19th century adaptation of the landscape.

30 Kent Street, Millers Point was listed on the New South Wales State Heritage Register on 2 April 1999.

== See also ==
- Australian residential architectural styles
