= 28 Kent Street, Millers Point =

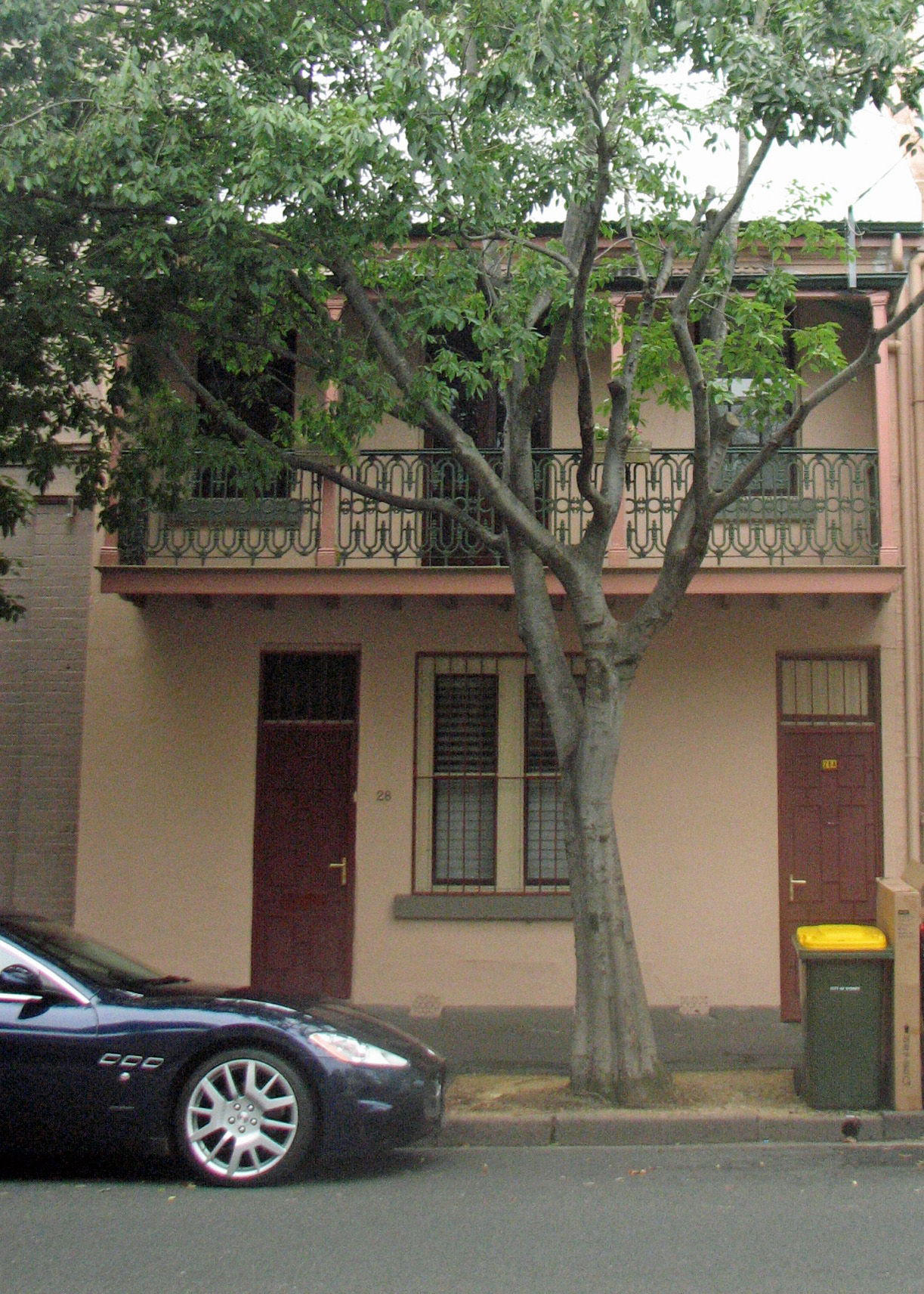
- 28 Kent Street, Millers Point, NSW

- Location within Sydney Location within Australia
- 33.8590°S 151.2038°E
- Location: 28 Kent Street, Millers Point, City of Sydney, New South Wales, Australia

History
- Built: 1860s

Site notes
- Architectural style: Victorian Filigree

New South Wales Heritage Register
- Official name: Building
- Type: State heritage (built)
- Designated: 2 April 1999
- Reference no.: 854
- Type: Terrace
- Category: Residential buildings (private)

28 Kent Street, Millers Point is a heritage-listed former retail building and now residence located at 28 Kent Street, in the inner city Sydney suburb of Millers Point in the City of Sydney local government area of New South Wales, Australia. The property was added to the New South Wales State Heritage Register on 2 April 1999.

== History ==
Millers Point is one of the earliest areas of European settlement in Australia, and a focus for maritime activities. Mostly intact, this two-storey early Victorian shop with cantilevered timber framed balcony over footpath.

== Description ==
A two-storey Victorian terrace house with four bedrooms. Features include a cantilevered balcony over footpath, a corrugated iron verandah, panelled front door with fanlight and a sash window with slab sill on ground floor. This residence has four bedrooms. Storeys: Two; Construction: Painted brick work. Corrugated galvanised iron roof. Painted joinery. Cast iron lace, timber framed balcony. Style: Victorian Filigree.

The external condition of this property is good.

=== Modifications and dates ===
External: Fanlight infilled. Ground floor window replaced. Last inspected: 21 February 1995.

== Heritage listing ==
As at 23 November 2000, this 1860s terrace forms part of a cohesive streetscape element.

It is part of the Millers Point Conservation Area, an intact residential and maritime precinct. It contains residential buildings and civic spaces dating from the 1830s and is an important example of 19th century adaptation of the landscape.

28 Kent Street, Millers Point was listed on the New South Wales State Heritage Register on 2 April 1999.

== See also ==
- Australian residential architectural styles
