= 115–121 Kent Street, Millers Point =

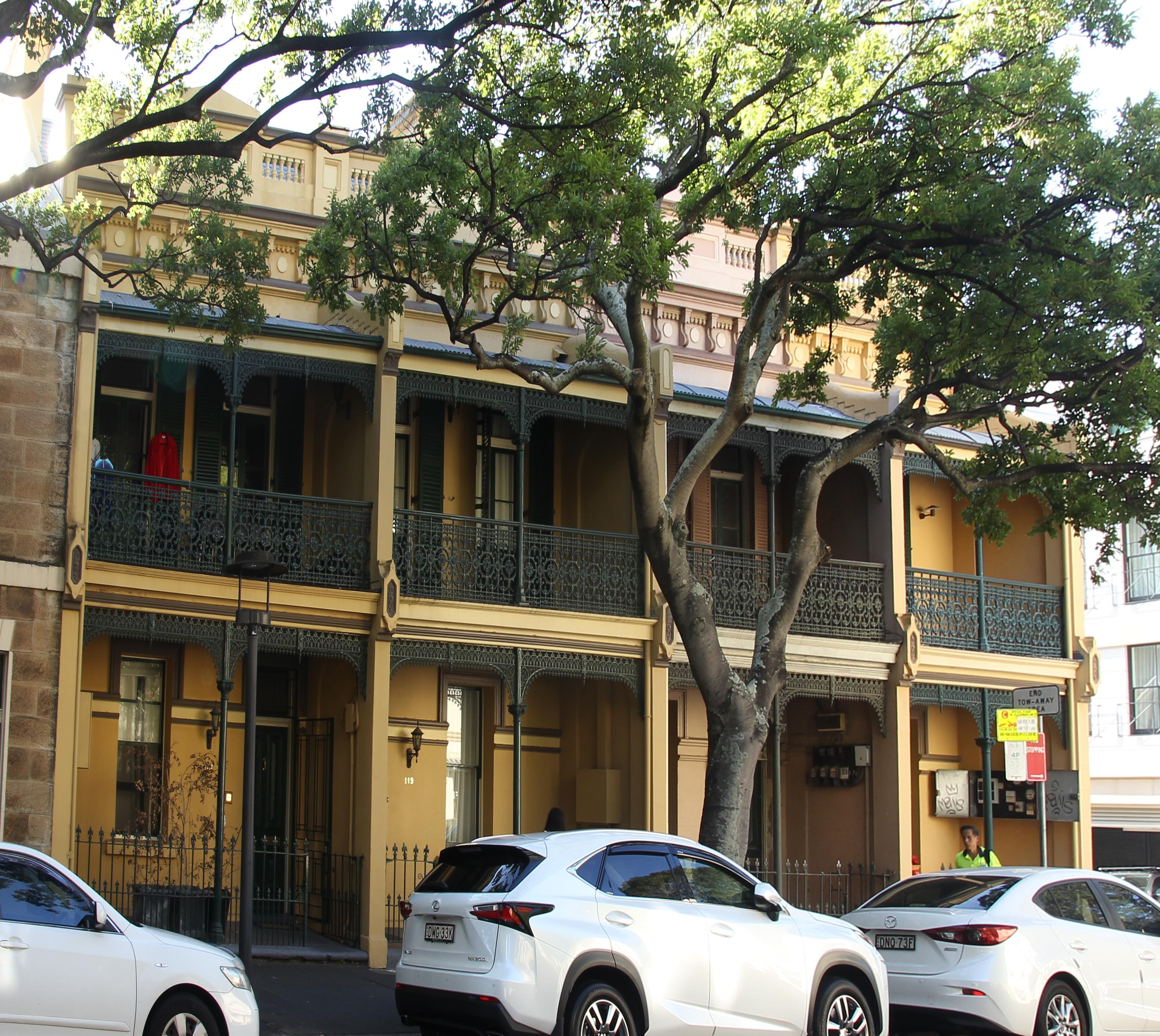
- 115–121 Kent Street, pictured in 2019

- Location within Sydney Location within Australia
- 33.8612°S 151.2035°E
- Location: 115, 117, 119, 121 Kent Street, Millers Point, City of Sydney, New South Wales, Australia

Site notes
- Architectural style: Victorian Italianate

New South Wales Heritage Register
- Official name: Terrace
- Type: State heritage (built)
- Designated: 2 April 1999
- Reference no.: 908
- Type: Terrace
- Category: Residential buildings (private)

115–121 Kent Street, Millers Point are heritage-listed terrace houses located at 115–121 Kent Street, in the inner city Sydney suburb of Millers Point in the City of Sydney local government area of New South Wales, Australia. The property was added to the New South Wales State Heritage Register on 2 April 1999.

== History ==
Millers Point is one of the earliest areas of European settlement in Australia, and a focus for maritime activities. First tenanted by the NSW Department of Housing in 1983.

== Description ==
One of a group of two storey Victorian Italianate terraces in good condition. Of particular note is the elaborate parapet with many classical details concealing dormer windows to the attics and the fine cast iron balustrades and columns to the verandahs on both levels. This terrace contains four one-bedroom units. Construction: Painted rendered masonry walls, slate roof to main body of house corrugated galvanised iron to balcony roof and rear wing. Decorative iron lace. Painted timber joinery. Style: Victorian Italianate.

The external condition of the property is good.

== Heritage listing ==
The New South Wales Heritage Register cites the buildings' detailed facade as an important element of the streetscape.

It is part of the Millers Point Conservation Area, an intact residential and maritime precinct. It contains residential buildings and civic spaces dating from the 1830s and is an important example of 19th century adaptation of the landscape.

== See also ==
- Australian residential architectural styles
