= Millers Point =

Suburb of Sydney, New South Wales

- Suburb
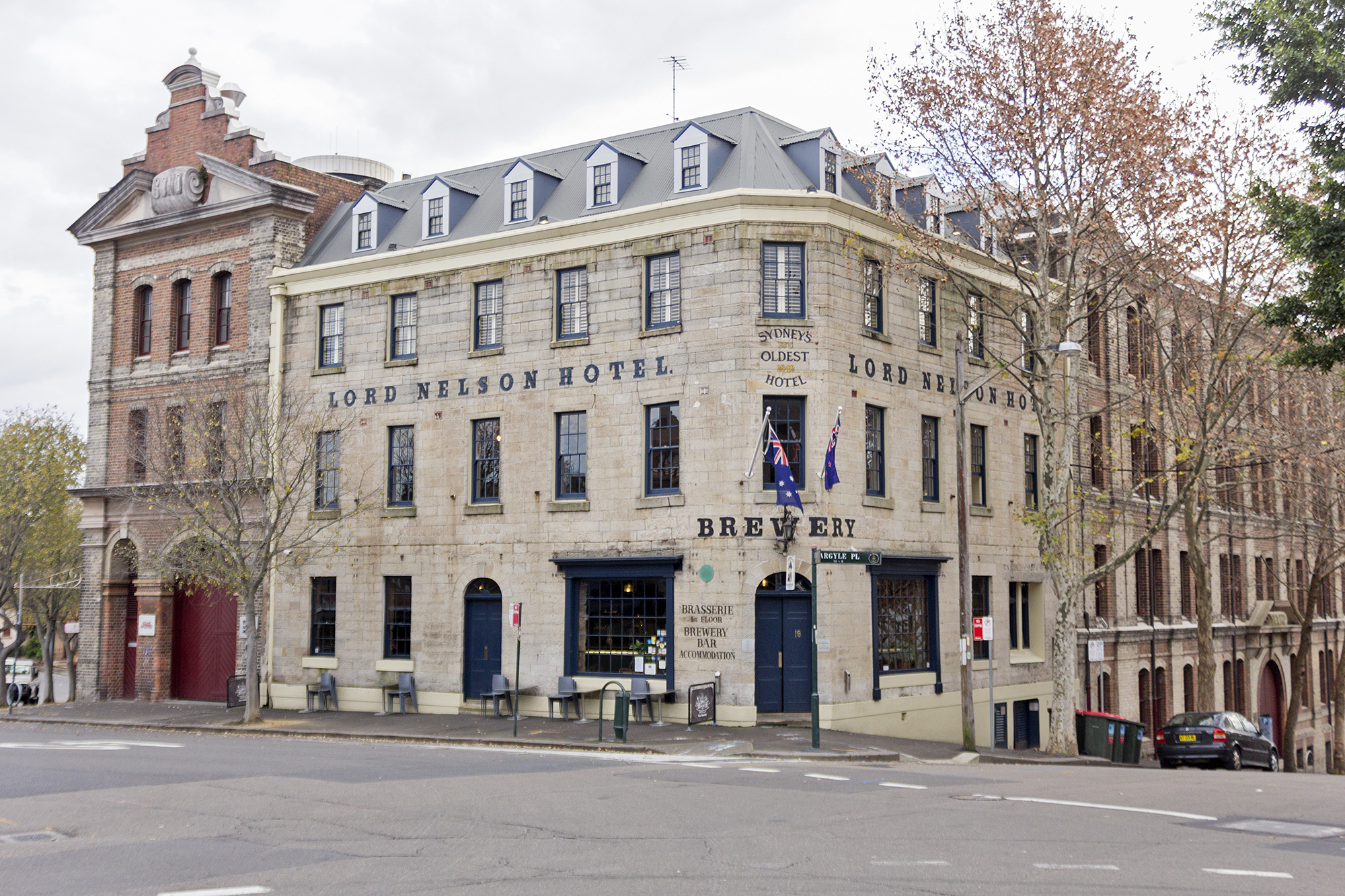

- Interactive map of Millers Point
- Country: Australia
- State: New South Wales
- City: Sydney
- LGA: City of Sydney
- Location: 1 km (0.62 mi) north-west of Sydney CBD

Government
  - State electorate: Sydney
  - Federal division: Sydney

Area
  - Total: 0.25 km^{2} (0.097 sq mi)

Population
  - Total: 1,735 (SAL 2021)
  - Density: 6,940/km^{2} (18,000/sq mi)
- Postcode: 2000
- Parish: St. Philip
Suburbs around Millers Point
Port Jackson	Port Jackson	Dawes Point
Darling Harbour	Millers Point	The Rocks
Barangaroo	Sydney CBD	Sydney CBD

Millers Point is an inner-city suburb of Sydney, in the state of New South Wales, Australia. It is on the north-western edge of the Sydney central business district, adjacent to The Rocks and is part of the local government area of the City of Sydney.

Millers Point lies on the southern shore of Sydney Harbour, beside Darling Harbour. The Barangaroo development is taking place on 22 hectares of land on the western side of the suburb. Millers Point historically includes what are now known as the suburbs of Dawes Point and Barangaroo and the renaming of those parts of Millers Point is controversial. The original headland of Millers Point is now known as Barangaroo Reserve, though the point itself has been returned to its original name.

== History ==
On 30 June 1814 Thomas Miller, a Sergeant in the 73rd Regiment of Foot, received a grant of land from the governor. A small mill that was owned by an ex-convict, Jack Leighton was located here. The area became known as Jack, the Miller's Point. In 1833 Governor Bourke granted the Catholic Church land at Millers Point for the construction of a school house that could serve as a chapel on Sundays. The Colonial Architect, Ambrose Hallen in consultation with Bishop Ullathorne, designed the school building which was completed by May 1835. It was a one-story building constructed in sandstone with two rooms that could be opened into one. St Brigid's Church is one of the oldest existing places of Catholic worship in Australia. The school was closed in 1992 but the church continues to be used by the local community.

From 1841 to 1921, Miller's Point was the location of a gasworks owned by the Australian Gaslight Company.

The current Sydney Observatory building on Observatory Hill was completed in 1858 by English astronomer and clergyman William Scott. Also on Observatory Hill is the old Fort Street School, converted from the old Military Hospital at Fort Phillip in the 1850s. Fort Street School incorporated the first government secondary school in Australia, and after the secondary school moved out in 1975, its building has housed the National Trust of Australia; the primary school remains nearby in a separate, heritage-listed building.

Two separate pubs in the area claim to be Sydney's oldest surviving pubs, the Lord Nelson (built in about 1836, but modified since) at Millers Point and the Fortune of War (which was built in its current form in 1922, although a hotel was operating on the site in 1830) nearby at The Rocks. Other active pubs in the area include the Palisade, the Hero of Waterloo and the Captain Cook.

== Population ==
At the 2021 census, the population of Millers Point was 1,735. 49.2% of people were born in Australia and 68.3% of people only spoke English at home. The most common response for religion was No Religion at 42.2%.

In the 2016 census, there were 1,482 people in Millers Point. 42.5% of people were born in Australia and 59.9% of people only spoke English at home. The most common response for religion was No Religion at 29.3%.

== Protests ==
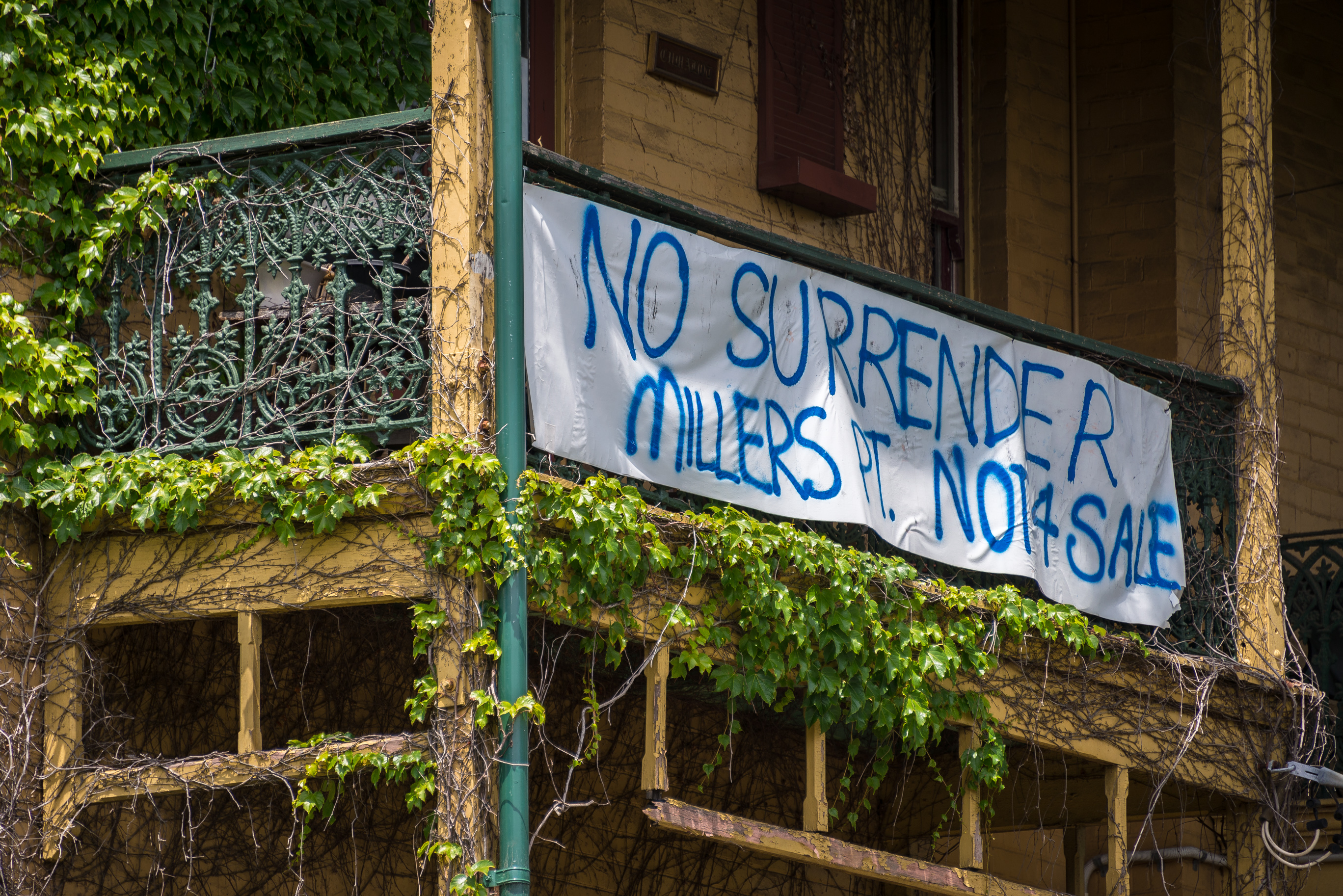
Protest Signs in 2014

A protest movement developed from 2008 when various governments announced plans to lease and sell Millers Point, Dawes Point and The Rocks properties and move existing public housing tenants. "Save Our Community", "Friends of Millers Point" and the associated "Save Our Sirius" formed to protest the relocation of residents.

== Heritage listings ==
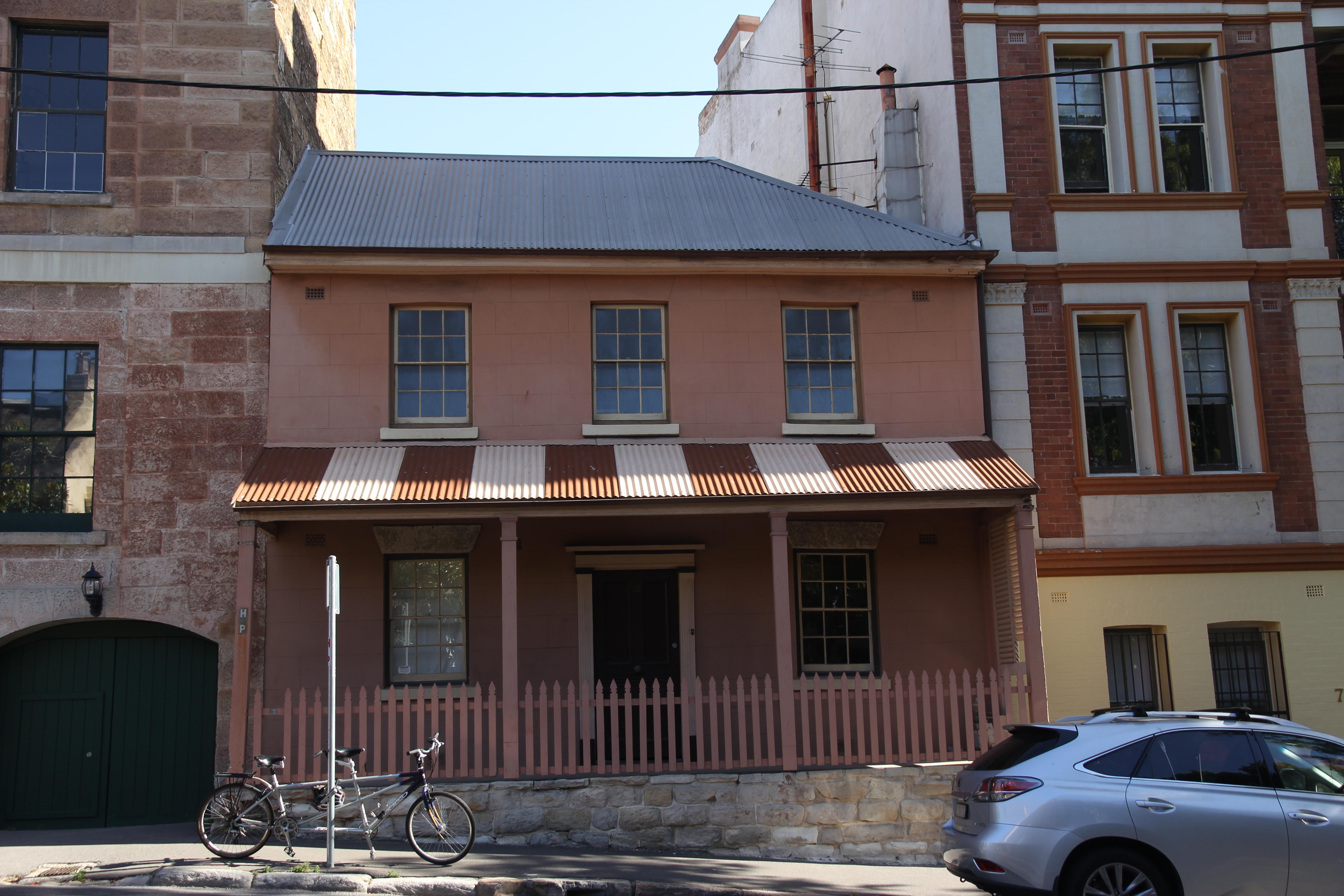
Shipwrights Arms Inn

Millers Point has many heritage-listed sites, including:

- Millers Point Conservation Area
- 1, 3, 5, 7 Argyle Place: 1–7 Argyle Place, Millers Point
- 6, 8 Argyle Place: 6–8 Argyle Place, Millers Point
- 9 Argyle Place: 9 Argyle Place, Millers Point
- 10, 10a, 12, 12a Argyle Place: 10–12a Argyle Place, Millers Point
- 22, 24, 26, 30, 32 Argyle Place: 22–32 Argyle Place, Millers Point
- 34 Argyle Place: Osborne House
- 36, 38 Argyle Place: 36–38 Argyle Place, Millers Point
- 40, 42, 44 Argyle Place: 40–44 Argyle Place, Millers Point
- 46, 48 Argyle Place: 46–48 Argyle Place, Millers Point
- 50 Argyle Place: Undercliffe Cottage
- 52, 54, 56, 58, 60 Argyle Place: Undercliffe Terrace
- 62, 64 Argyle Place: 62–64 Argyle Place, Millers Point
- Argyle Street: Garrison Anglican Church Precinct
- 35–37 Bettington Street: Palisade Hotel
- 56, 58, 60 Bettington Street: 56–60 Bettington Street, Millers Point
- 66, 68 Bettington Street: 66–68 Bettington Street, Millers Point
- 7, 9, 11, 13 Dalgety Road: 7–13 Dalgety Road, Millers Point
- 15, 17, 19, 21, 23, 25 Dalgety Road: 15–25 Dalgety Road, Millers Point
- 27a, 29a, 31a, 33, 35a Dalgety Road: 27a–35a Dalgety Road, Millers Point
- Hickson Road: Grafton Bond Store
- Hickson Road: Walsh Bay Wharves Precinct
- 2–36 High Street: 2–36 High Street, Millers Point
- 3, 5, 7, 9 High Street: 3–9 High Street, Millers Point
- 38–72 High Street: 38–72 High Street, Millers Point
- 74–80 High Street: 74–80 High Street, Millers Point
- 2–4 Jenkins Street: MSB Stores Complex
- 1–17 Kent Street: Oswald Bond Store
- 12 Kent Street: Millers Point Post Office
- 14, 16 Kent Street: St Brigid's Roman Catholic Church
- 18, 20, 22 Kent Street: 18-22 Kent Street, Millers Point
- 19 Kent Street: Lord Nelson Hotel
- 21, 23, 25, 27, 29 Kent Street: 21–29 Kent Street, Millers Point
- 24, 26 Kent Street: House of Bodleigh
- 28 Kent Street: 28 Kent Street, Millers Point
- 30 Kent Street: 30 Kent Street, Millers Point
- 32, 34, 36, 38, 40 Kent Street: 32–40 Kent Street, Millers Point
- 33, 35 Kent Street: Captain Cook Hotel
- 37, 39, 41, 43, 45, 47 Kent Street: Alfred's Terrace
- 42 Kent Street: 42 Kent Street, Millers Point
- 44 Kent Street: 44 Kent Street, Millers Point
- 46 Kent Street: 46 Kent Street, Millers Point
- 48, 50 Kent Street: 48–50 Kent Street, Millers Point
- 49, 51 Kent Street: 49–51 Kent Street, Millers Point
- 52, 54 Kent Street: 52–54 Kent Street, Millers Point
- 53, 55 Kent Street: 53–55 Kent Street, Millers Point
- 56, 58 Kent Street: 56–58 Kent Street, Millers Point
- 59, 61, 63 Kent Street: Hexam Terrace
- 60, 62 Kent Street: 60–62 Kent Street, Millers Point
- 71, 73 Kent Street: 71–73 Kent Street, Millers Point
- 75, 77, 79 Kent Street: Winsbury Terrace
- 81 Kent Street: Katoomba House
- 82, 84, 86, 88 Kent Street: Blyth Terrace
- 83, 85 Kent Street: 83–85 Kent Street, Millers Point
- 90, 92 Kent Street: 90–92 Kent Street, Millers Point
- 94 Kent Street: Toxteth
- 115, 117, 119, 121 Kent Street: 115–121 Kent Street, Millers Point
- 123, 125 Kent Street: 123–125 Kent Street, Millers Point
- 1–19 Lower Fort Street: Milton Terrace
- 18 Lower Fort Street: Harbour View Hotel
- 20 Lower Fort Street: 20 Lower Fort Street, Millers Point
- 21, 23 Lower Fort Street: 21–23 Lower Fort Street, Millers Point
- 22 Lower Fort Street: 22 Lower Fort Street, Millers Point
- 24, 26 Lower Fort Street: 24–26 Lower Fort Street, Millers Point
- 25, 27, 29, 31, 33, 35 Lower Fort Street: Linsley Terrace
- 28 Lower Fort Street: 28 Lower Fort Street, Millers Point
- 30, 32, 34, 36, 38, 40, 42 Lower Fort Street: 30–42 Lower Fort Street, Millers Point
- 39, 41 Lower Fort Street: 39–41 Lower Fort Street, Millers Point
- 43 Lower Fort Street: Clydebank
- 47, 49, 51, 53 Lower Fort Street: 47–53 Lower Fort Street, Millers Point
- 55 Lower Fort Street: 55 Lower Fort Street, Millers Point
- 57, 59, 61 Lower Fort Street: Regency Townhouses
- 63, 65 Lower Fort Street: Vermont Terrace
- 67, 69, 71, 73 Lower Fort Street: Eagleton Terrace
- 75, 77 Lower Fort Street: 75–77 Lower Fort Street, Millers Point
- 79 Lower Fort Street: 79 Lower Fort Street, Millers Point
- 81, 83 Lower Fort Street: Hero of Waterloo Hotel
- 85 Lower Fort Street: Argyle House
- 14–16 Merriman Street: 14–16 Merriman Street, Millers Point
- 18 Merriman Street: 18 Merriman Street, Millers Point
- 20, 22, 24, 26, 28, 30, 32, 34, 36, 38, 40, 42, 44, 48 Merriman Street: Merriman Street Terraces
- Munn Street: Dalgety's Bond Stores
- 18, 18a, 20, 20a Munn Street: 18–20a Munn Street, Millers Poin
- Sydney Harbour Bridge (southern approaches/exits)
- Trinity Avenue: Argyle Street Railway Substation
- 2, 4 Trinity Avenue: 2–4 Trinity Avenue, Millers Point
- 8, 10, 12 Trinity Avenue: Darling House
- 14, 16, 18, 20, 22 Trinity Avenue: 14–22 Trinity Avenue, Millers Point
- Upper Fort Street: Millers Point & Dawes Point Village Precinct
- Upper Fort Street: Sydney Observatory
- 1–63 Windmill Street: 1–63 Windmill Street, Millers Point
- 65 Windmill Street: 65 Windmill Street, Millers Point
- 67 Windmill Street: 67 Windmill Street, Millers Point
- 69 Windmill Street: 69 Windmill Street, Millers Point
- 71 Windmill Street: 71 Windmill Street, Millers Point
- 73 Windmill Street: Stevens Terrace
- 75 Windmill Street: Shipwrights Arms Inn
- 82–84 Windmill Street: 82–84 Windmill Street, Millers Point
- 86, 88 Windmill Street: 86–88 Windmill Street, Millers Point
- 90–92 Windmill Street: 90–92 Windmill Street, Millers Point

In addition, the following Millers Point buildings are listed on various other heritage registers:

- Agar Steps and houses
- Argyle Cut and Argyle Street Space
- 110–114A Kent Street: Carlson Terrace
- 116–122 Kent Street: Richmond Villa
- 124–134 Kent Street: Glover cottages
- National Trust Centre (former Fort Street School), including S.H. Ervin Gallery

== Gallery ==
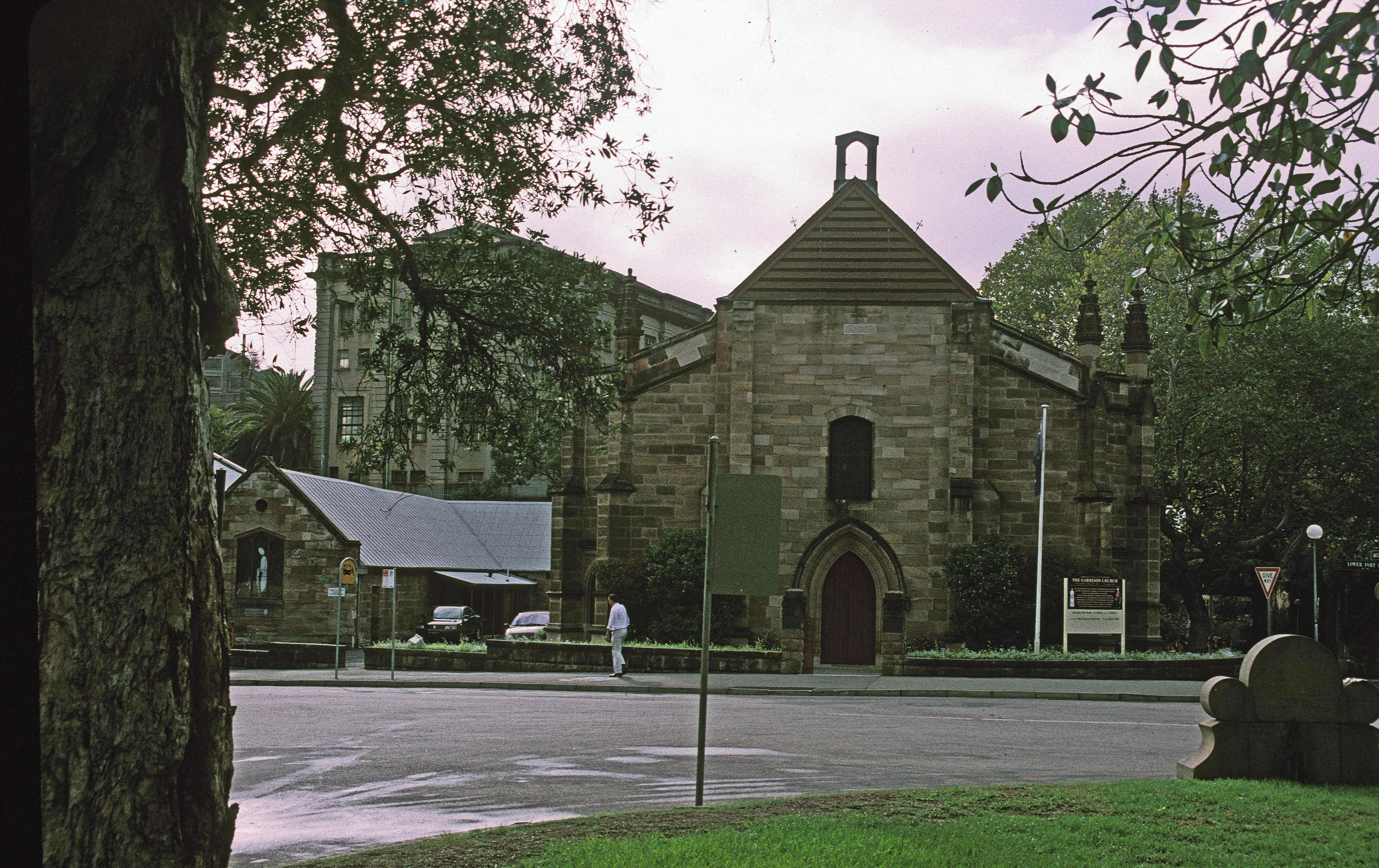
Garrison Church

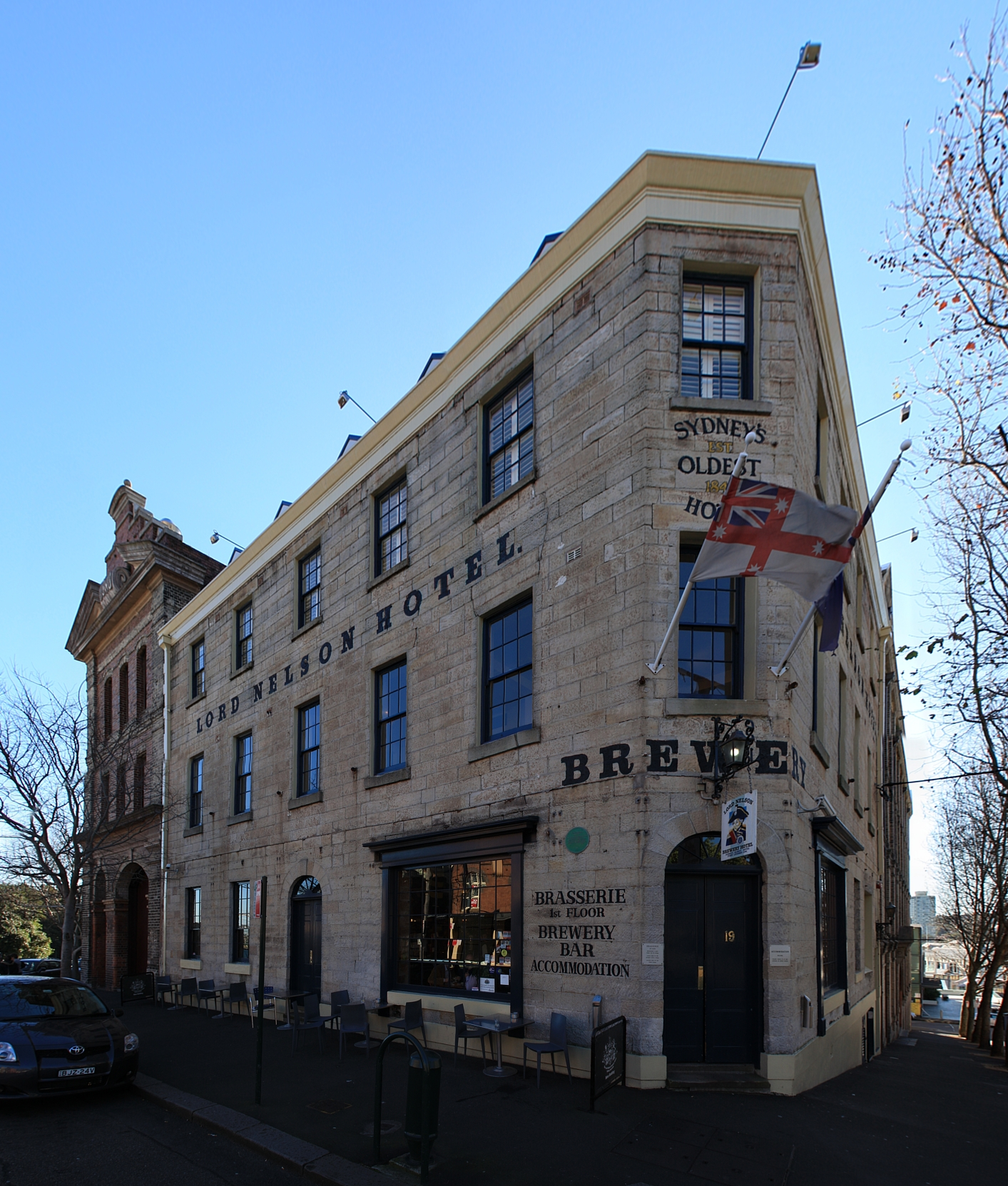
Lord Nelson, one of Sydney's oldest pubs

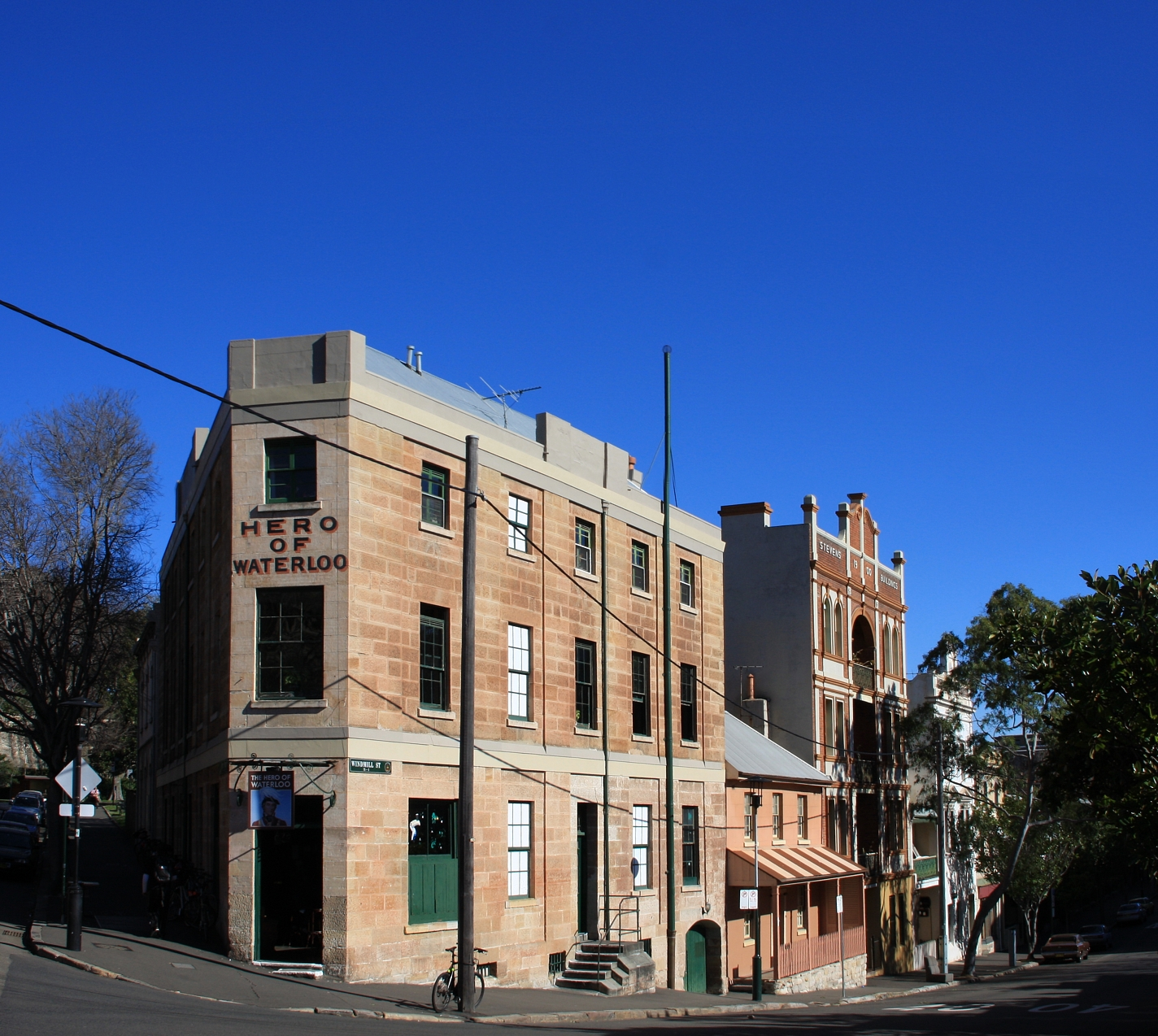
The Hero of Waterloo pub

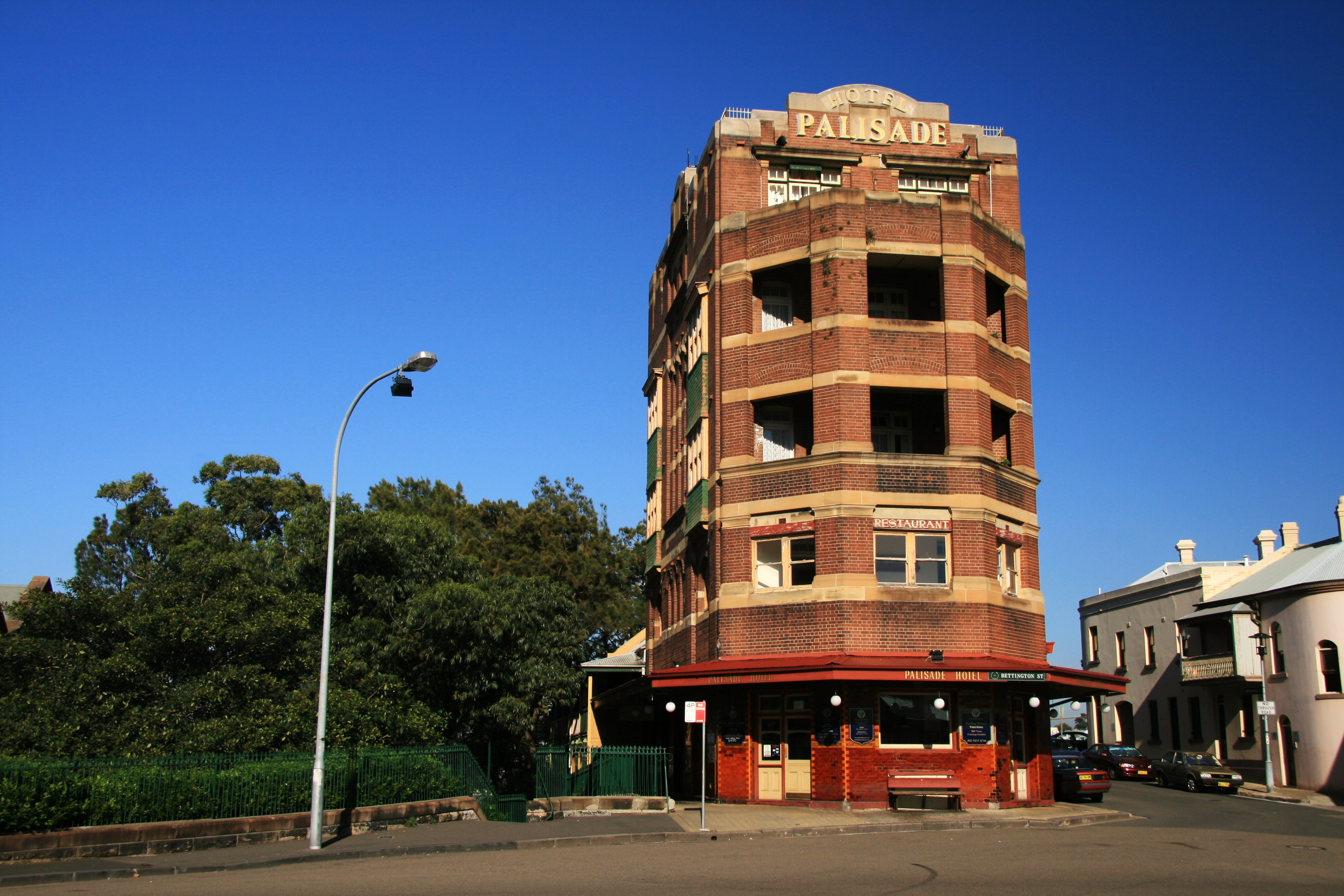
The Palisade Hotel

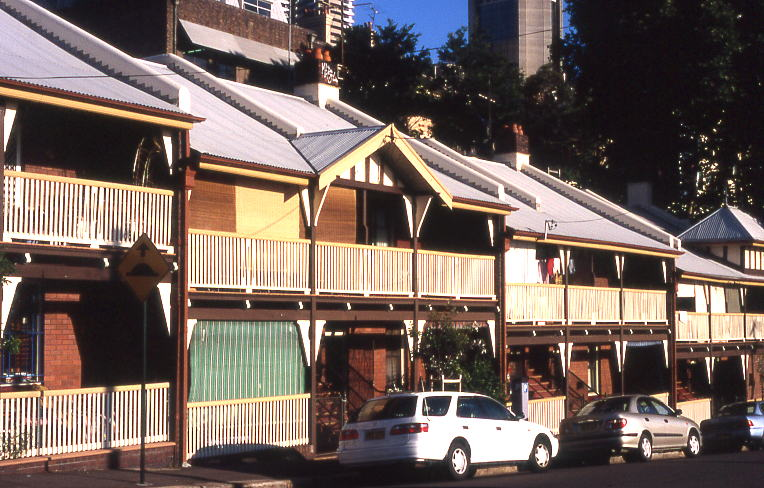
Federation Filigree homes, High Street

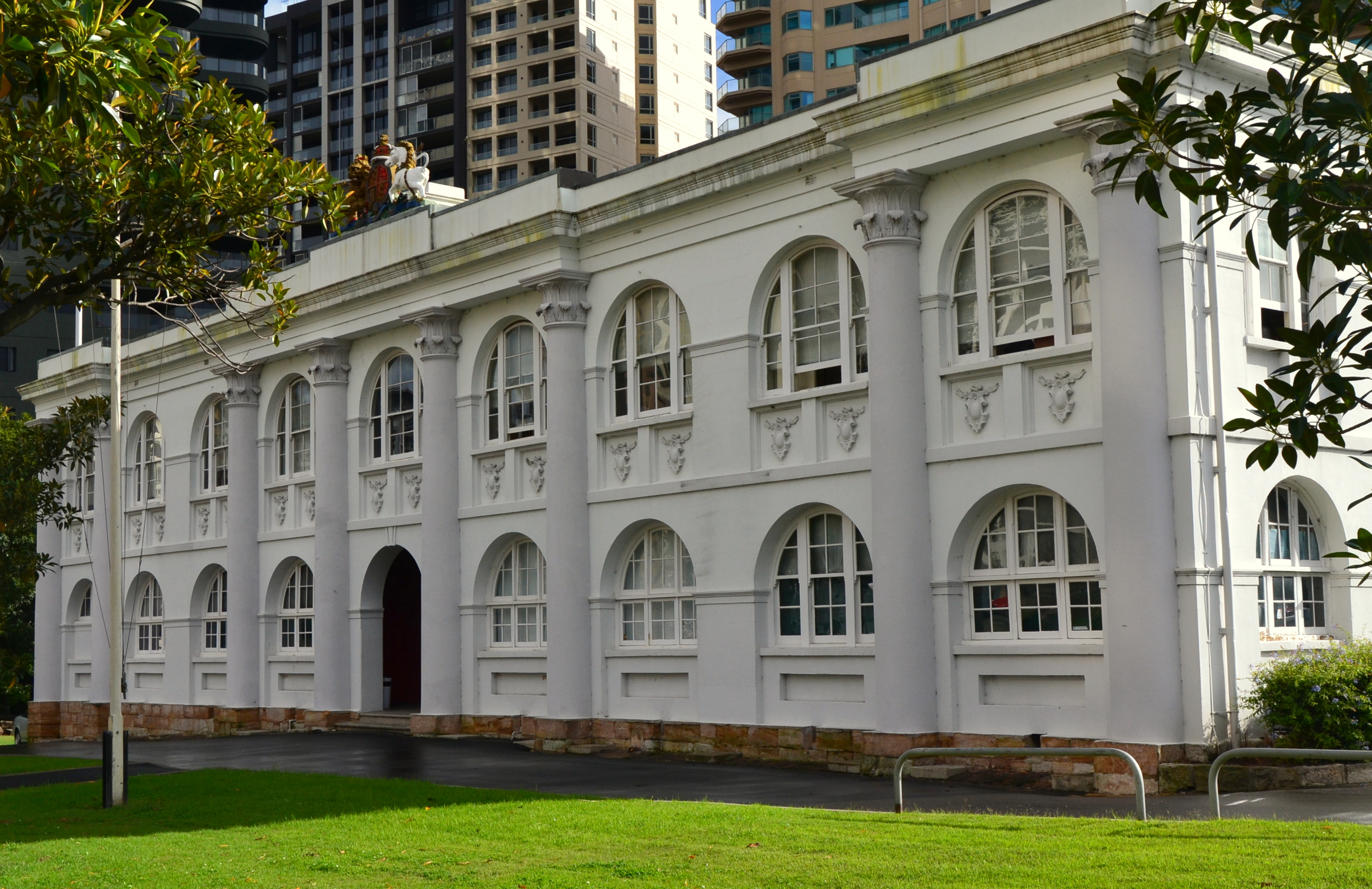
Former Fort Street School, now used by the National Trust

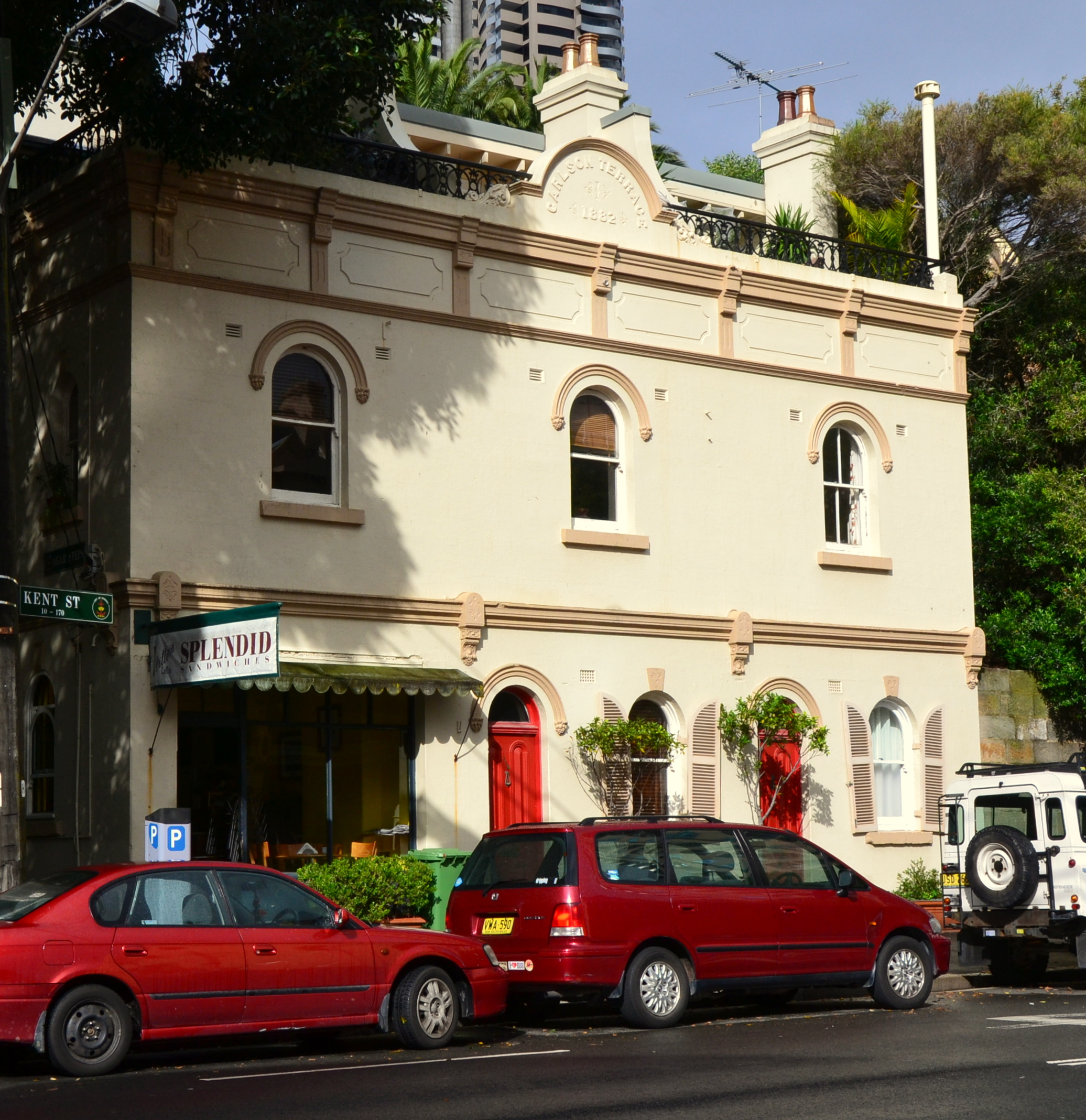
Carlson Terrace, Kent Street

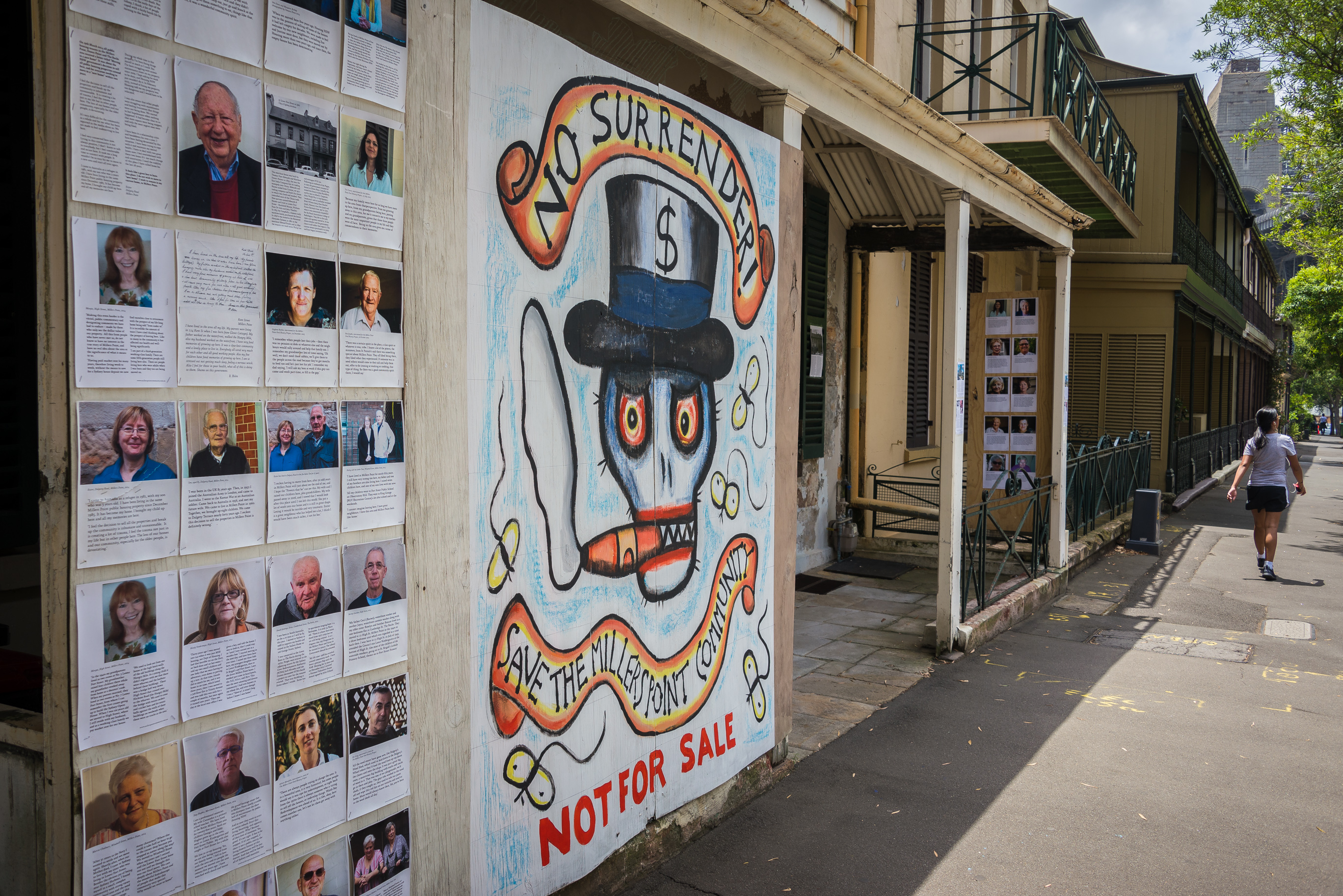
37 Lower Fort St in 2014

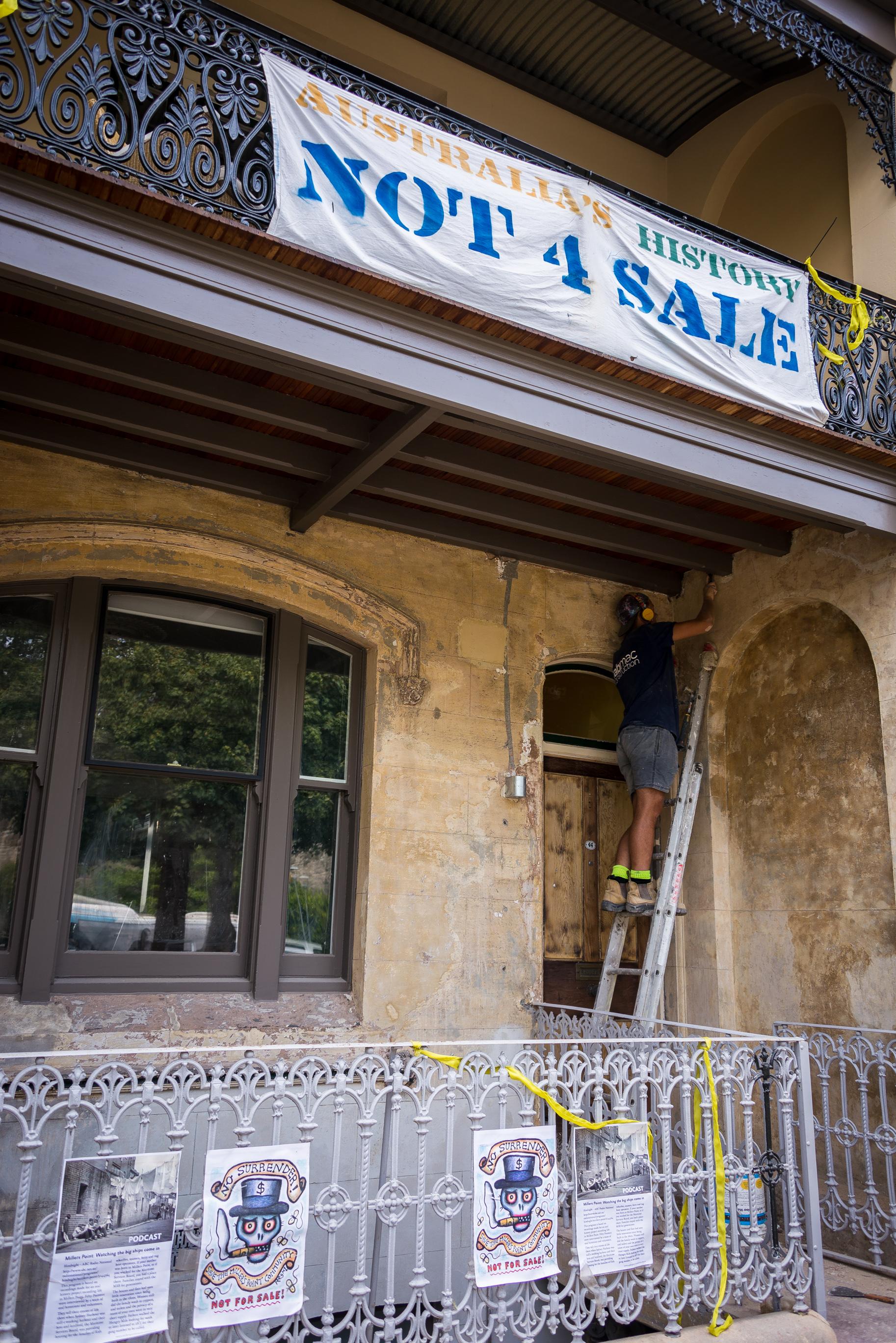
Protest Signs in 2014

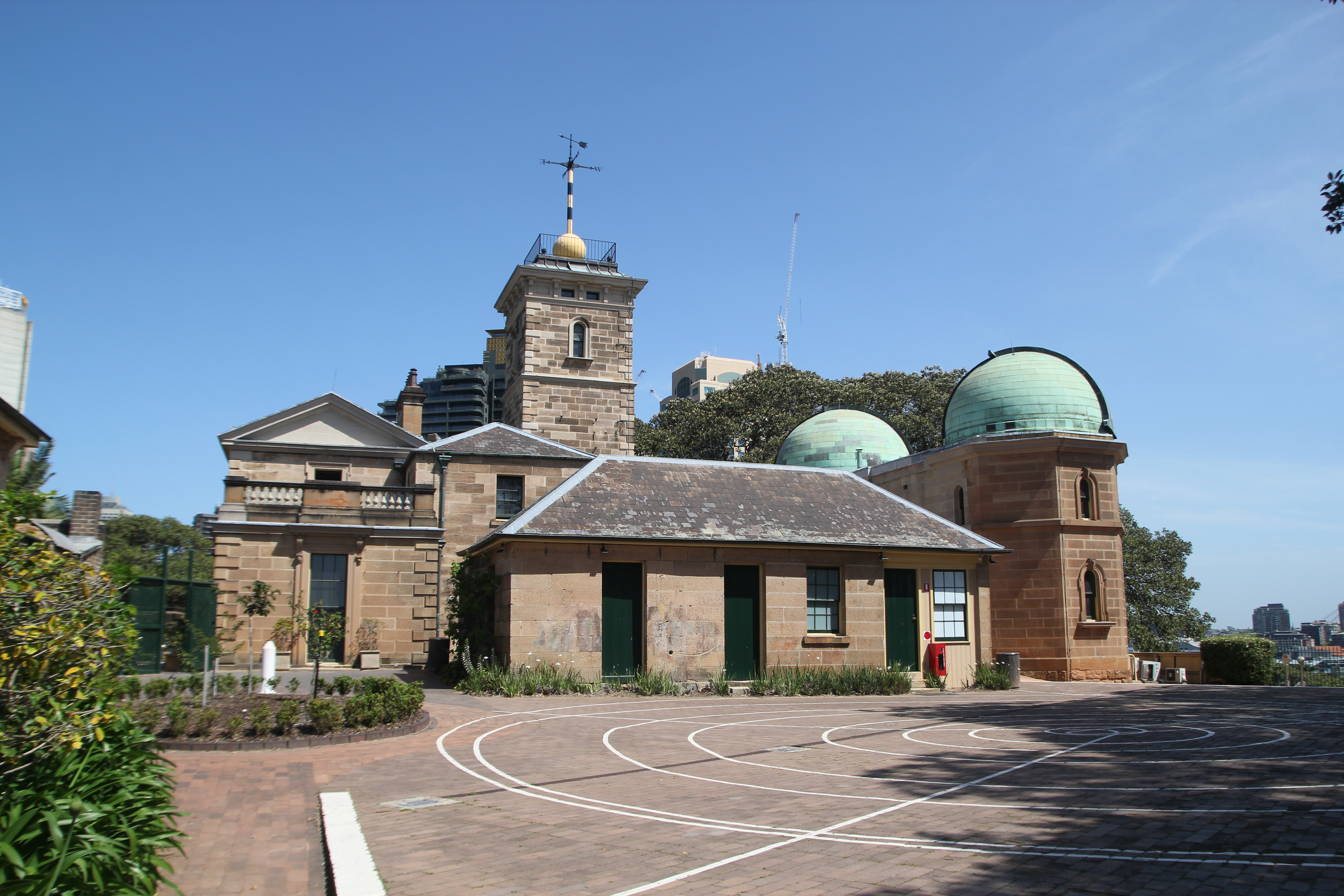
Sydney Observatory

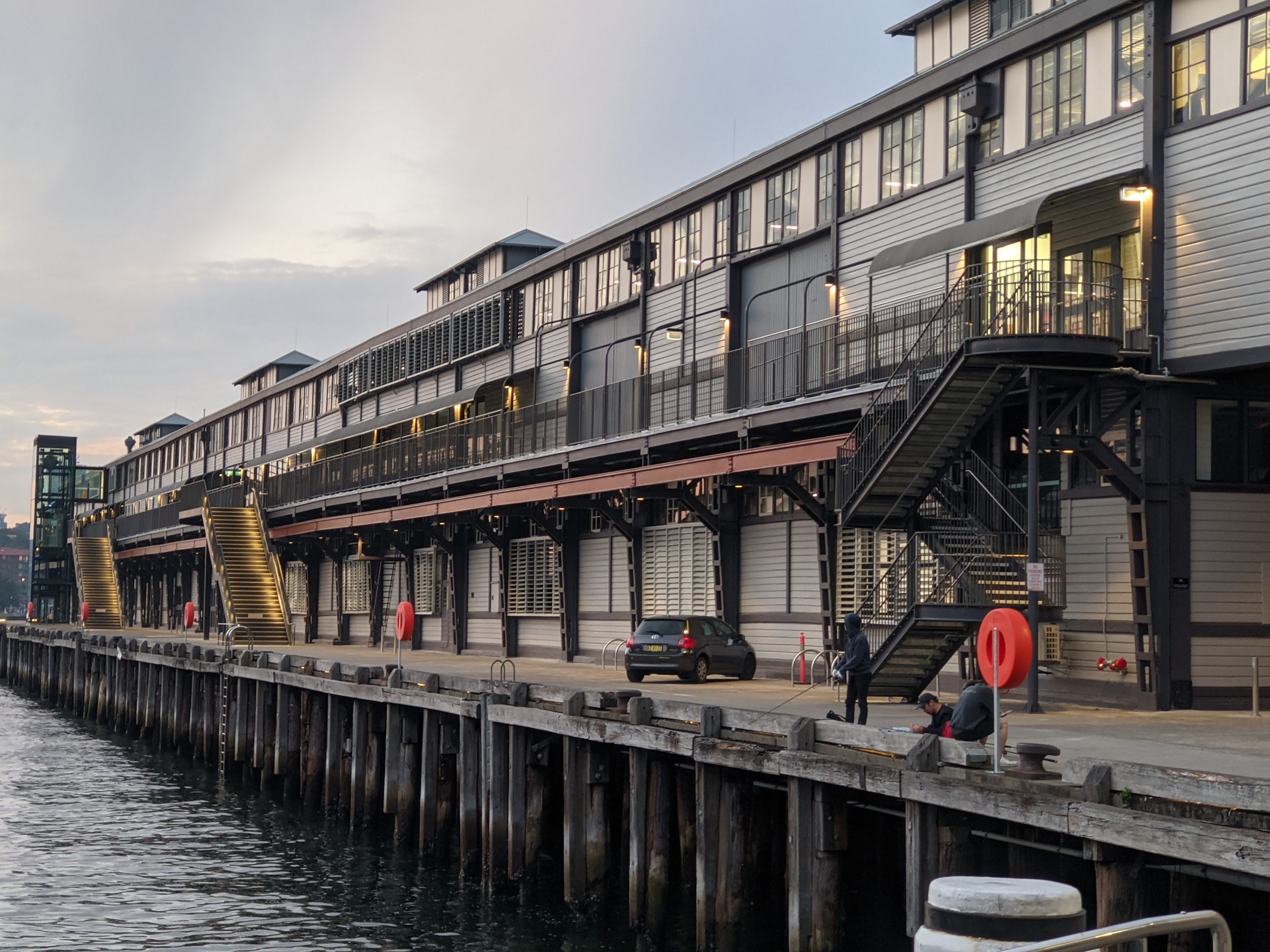
The historic Walsh Bay wharves

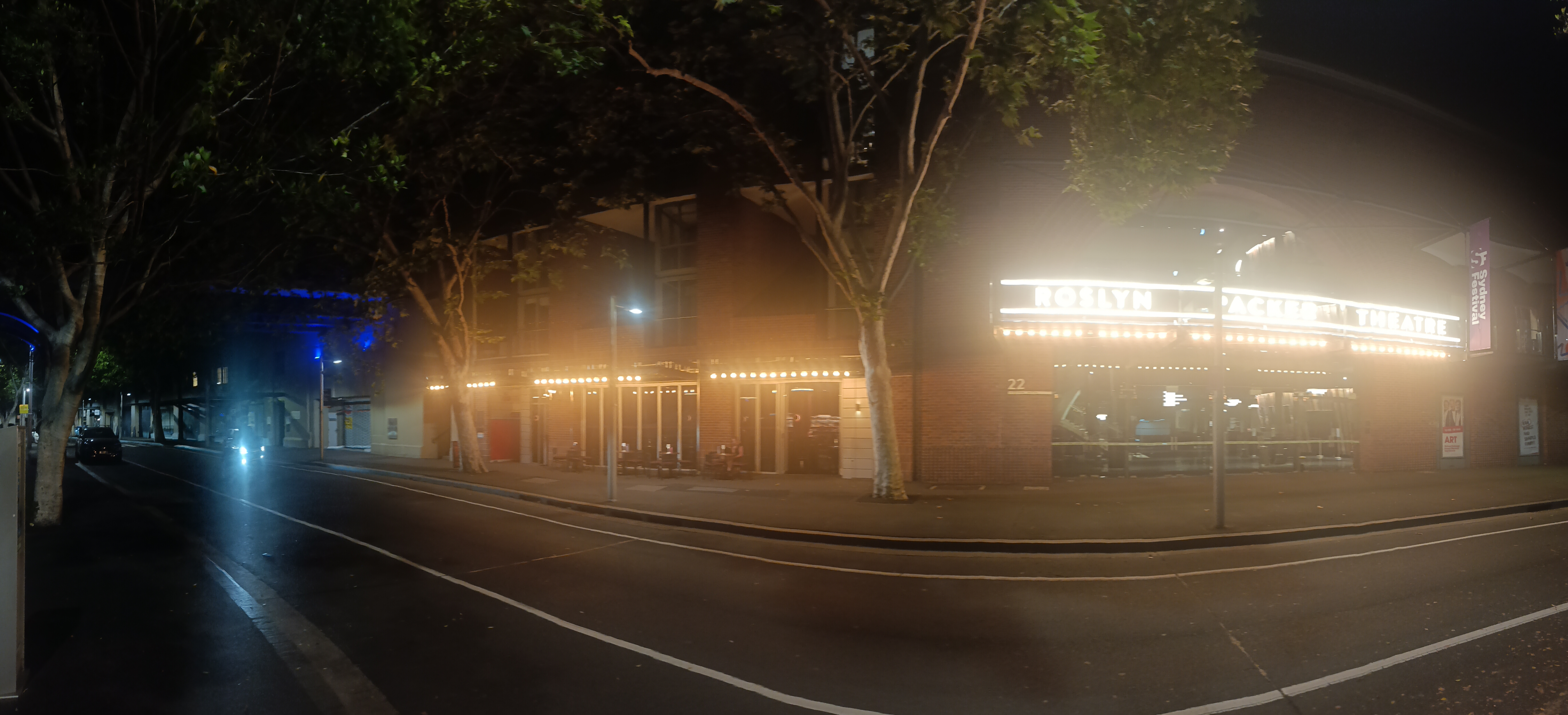
Roslyn Packer Theatre. 2026

== See also ==
- Barangaroo, New South Wales
- Sirius Building (with other public housing in Millers Point, threatened by sell-off during 2014)
