= 123–125 Kent Street, Millers Point =

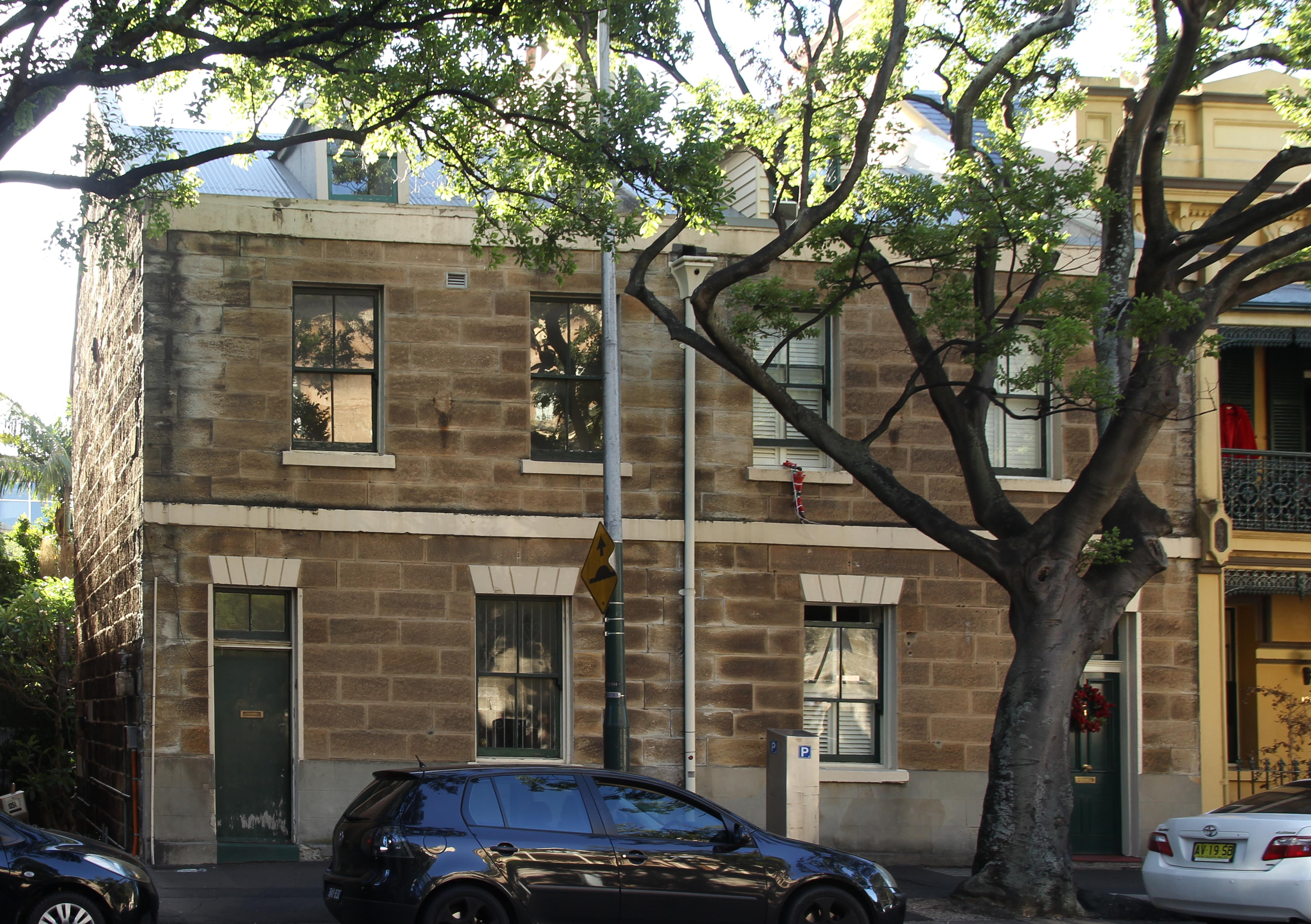
- 123–125 Kent Street, pictured in 2019.

- Location within Sydney Location within Australia
- 33.8614°S 151.2035°E
- Location: 123, 125 Kent Street, Millers Point, City of Sydney, New South Wales, Australia

Site notes
- Architectural style: Victorian Georgian

New South Wales Heritage Register
- Official name: Terrace
- Type: State heritage (built)
- Designated: 2 April 1999
- Reference no.: 901
- Type: Terrace
- Category: Residential buildings (private)

123–125 Kent Street, Millers Point are heritage-listed terrace houses located at 123 and 125 Kent Street, in the inner city Sydney suburb of Millers Point in the City of Sydney local government area of New South Wales, Australia. The property was added to the New South Wales State Heritage Register on 2 April 1999.

== History ==
Millers Point is one of the earliest areas of European settlement in Australia, and a focus for maritime activities. This is one of a group of two early-mid Victorian facestone terraces with attics. First tenanted by the NSW Department of Housing in 1986.

== Description ==
This face stone early-mid Victorian terrace has three storeys plus attic and is well proportioned. There are stone entablatures to doors and ground floor windows. This residence has four bedrooms. Storeys: four; Construction: Face sandstone walls, corrugated galvanised iron roof. Style: Victorian Georgian.

The external condition of the property is good.

=== Modifications and dates ===
External: Infill to rear verandahs, shutters removed - Last inspected on 19 February 1995.

== Heritage listing ==
As at 23 November 2000, these Victorian terraces are an important streetscape element.

It is part of the Millers Point Conservation Area, an intact residential and maritime precinct. It contains residential buildings and civic spaces dating from the 1830s and is an important example of 19th century adaptation of the landscape.

Terrace was listed on the New South Wales State Heritage Register on 2 April 1999.
