= 22 Lower Fort Street, Millers Point =

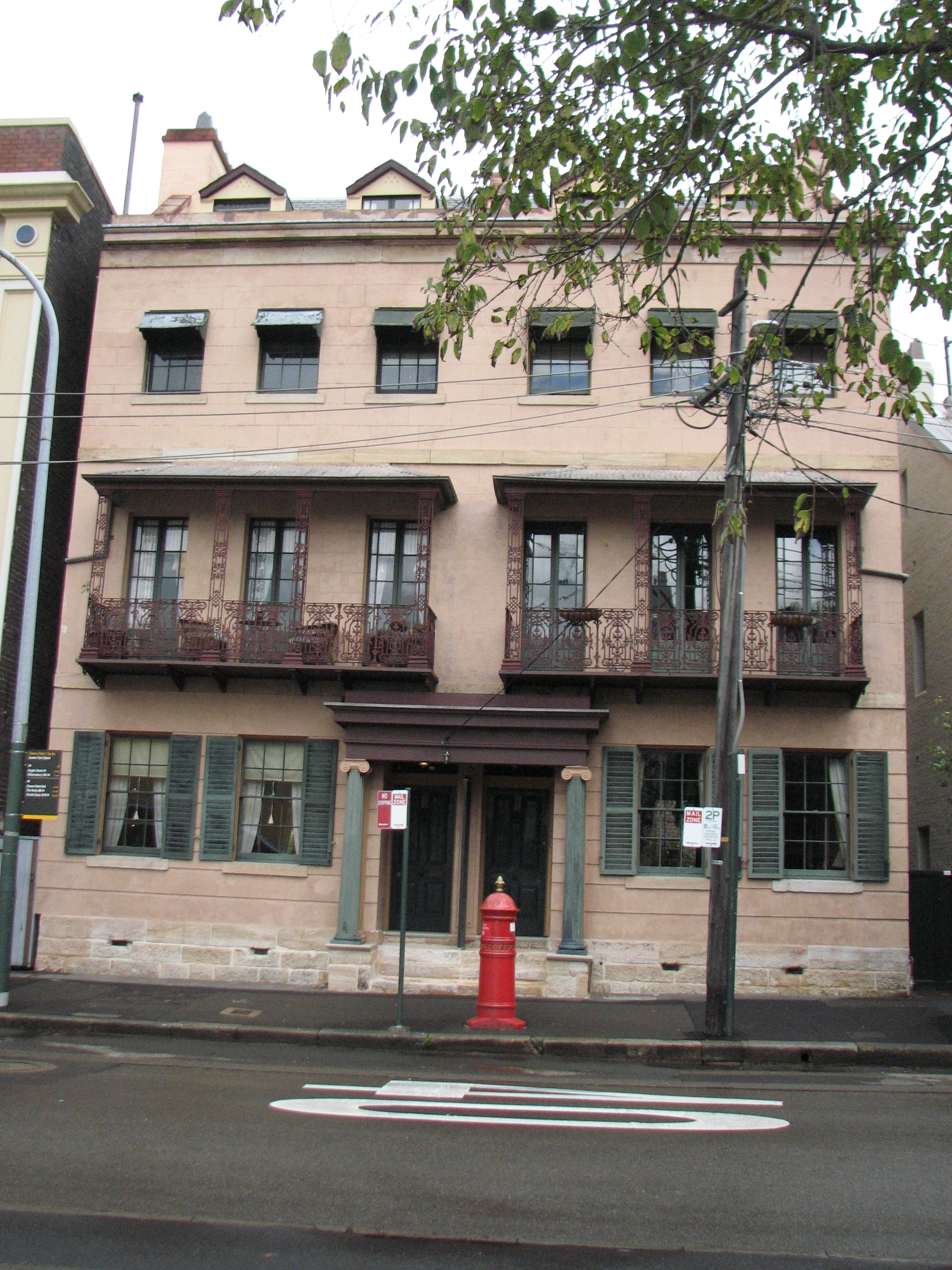
- 20–22 Lower Fort Street, Millers Point, New South Wales. No. 22 is of the right

- Location within Sydney Location within Australia
- 33.8568°S 151.2072°E
- Location: 22 Lower Fort Street, Millers Point, City of Sydney, New South Wales, Australia

Site notes
- Architectural style: Victorian Regency

New South Wales Heritage Register
- Official name: Townhouse
- Type: State heritage (built)
- Designated: 2 April 1999
- Reference no.: 880
- Type: Historic site

22 Lower Fort Street, Millers Point is a heritage-listed former residence and now boarding house located at 22 Lower Fort Street, in the inner city Sydney suburb of Millers Point in the City of Sydney local government area of New South Wales, Australia. The property was added to the New South Wales State Heritage Register on 2 April 1999.

== History ==
Millers Point is one of the earliest areas of European settlement in Australia, and a focus for maritime activities. Constructed during the mid-1850s as one of a pair of London style townhouses, representing a significant streetscape element. First tenanted by the NSW Department of Housing in 1983.

== Description ==
Substantial Regency style, five-bedroom Victorian townhouse, based on the London model. Three storeys with basement and attic. Portico with ionic columns shared with neighbour. Iron lace cantilevered balcony on second storey, onto which open three french doors. Storeys: Three; Construction: Painted rendered masonry, corrugated galvanised iron roof. Iron lace on timber structured balcony. Style: Victorian Regency.

The external condition of the property is good.

=== Modifications and dates ===
External: Window hoods to top floor added. Some joinery modifications.

== Heritage listing ==
As at 26 September 2003, this property is one of two Regency style townhouses based on the London model of three storeys, and is in almost intact exterior condition.

It is part of the Millers Point Conservation Area, an intact residential and maritime precinct. It contains residential buildings and civic spaces dating from the 1830s and is an important example of 19th century adaptation of the landscape.

22 Lower Fort Street, Millers Point was listed on the New South Wales State Heritage Register on 2 April 1999.
