= 18 Merriman Street, Millers Point =

Historic house in Sydney, Australia

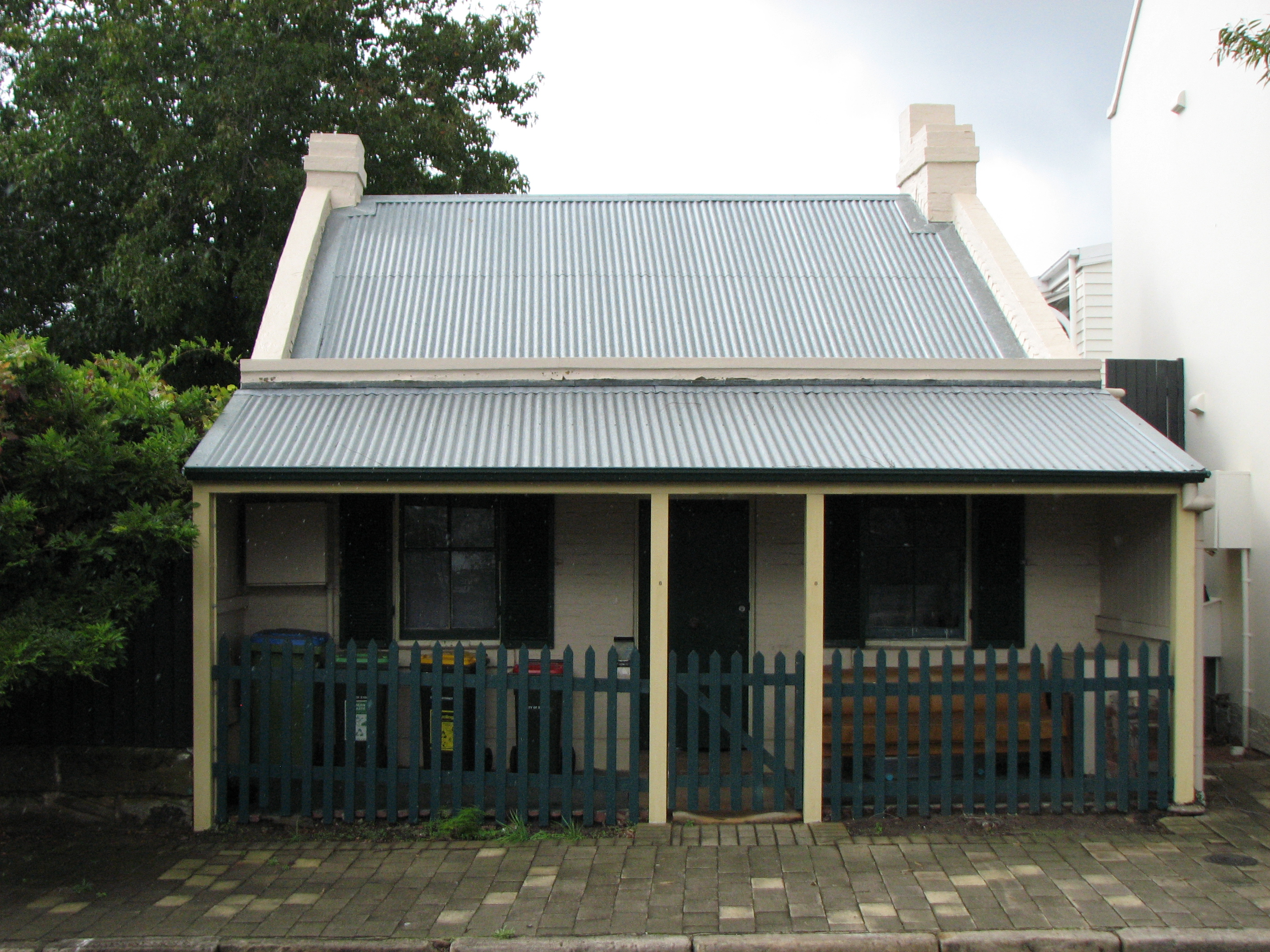
- 18 Merriman Street, Millers Point, New South Wales

- Location within Sydney Location within Australia
- 33.8572°S 151.2020°E
- Location: 18 Merriman Street, Millers Point, City of Sydney, New South Wales, Australia

History
- Built: c. 1855

Site notes
- Architectural style: Victorian Georgian

New South Wales Heritage Register
- Official name: Cottage
- Type: State heritage (built)
- Designated: 2 April 1999
- Reference no.: 857
- Type: Cottage
- Category: Residential buildings (private)

18 Merriman Street, Millers Point is a heritage-listed residence located at 18 Merriman Street, in the inner city Sydney suburb of Millers Point in the City of Sydney local government area of New South Wales, Australia. It was added to the New South Wales State Heritage Register on 2 April 1999.

== History ==
Millers Point is one of the earliest areas of European settlement in Australia, and a focus for maritime activities. Merriman Street contains a substantial collection of Georgian style houses and terraces. This cottage was built c. 1855, first tenanted by the NSW Department of Housing in 1986.

== Description ==
Simple single storey, two bedroom, Georgian style Victorian cottage with later verandah addition. Stone sills and brick arched lintels to door and windows. Shutters on windows, fanlight over entry door. Storeys: 1 Construction: Painted brick work, corrugated galvanised iron, timber verandah and joinery. Style: Victorian Georgian.

Externally, the condition of the property is good.

=== Modifications and dates ===
External: New front door recently added.

== Heritage listing ==
As at 23 November 2000, 18 Merriman Street contains housing groups of the utmost historical importance.

It is part of the Millers Point Conservation Area, an intact residential and maritime precinct. It contains residential buildings and civic spaces dating from the 1830s and is an important example of C19th adaptation of the landscape.

18 Merriman Street, Millers Point was listed on the New South Wales State Heritage Register on 2 April 1999.
