= Dalgety's Bond Stores =

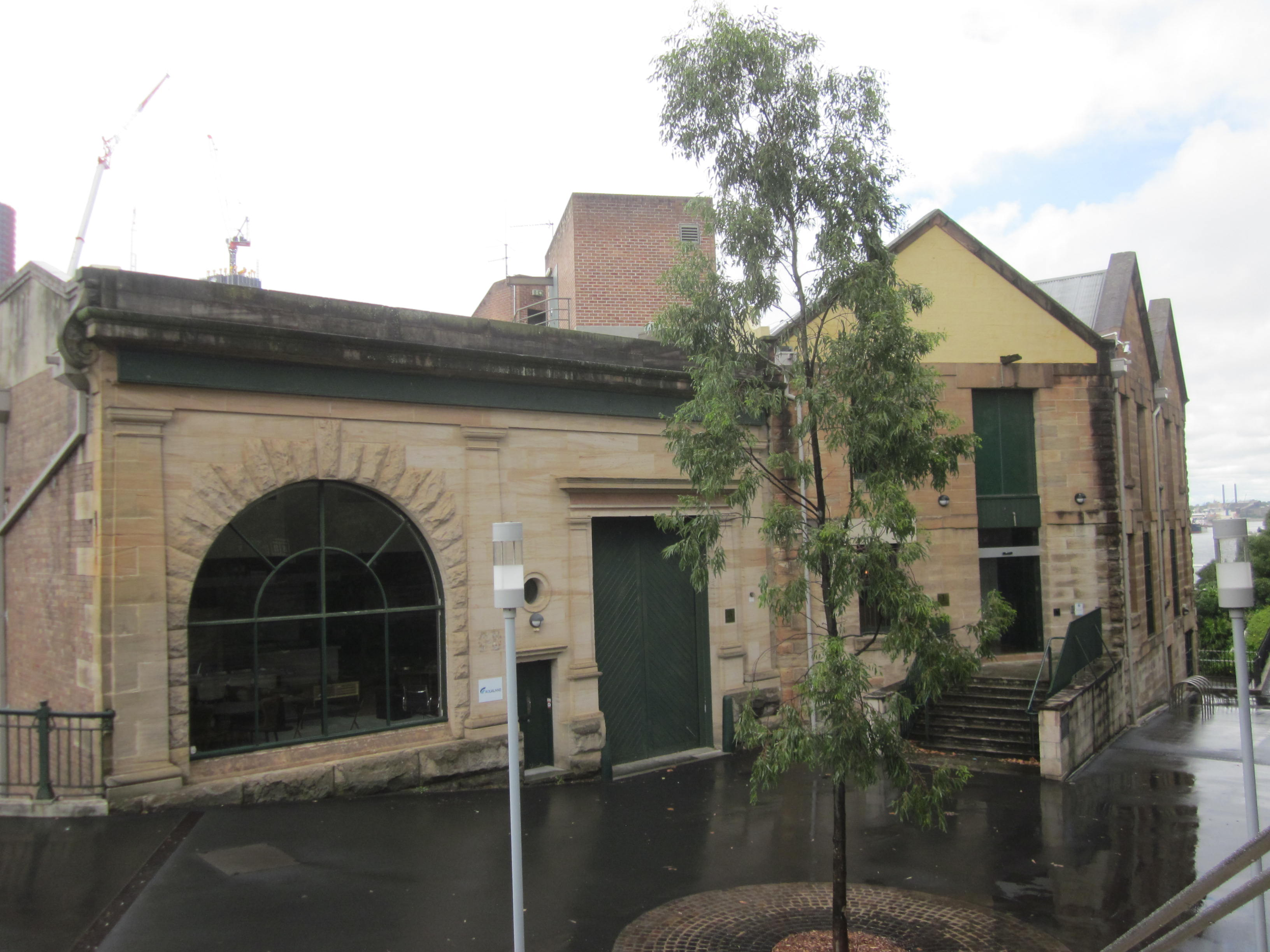
- Dalgety's Bond Stores, Munn Street, Miller's Point, NSW

- Location within Sydney Location within Australia
- 33.8585°S 151.2023°E
- Location: Munn Street, Millers Point, City of Sydney, New South Wales, Australia

History
- Built: 1875

New South Wales Heritage Register
- Official name: Warehouses; Munn Street Bond Stores; Dalgety Bond Stores
- Type: State heritage (built)
- Designated: 2 April 1999
- Reference no.: 526
- Type: Warehouse/storage area
- Category: Retail and Wholesale

Dalgety's Bond Stores is a heritage-listed former warehouse complex and now commercial building located at Munn Street, in the inner city Sydney suburb of Millers Point, New South Wales, Australia. It was built in 1875. It is also known as Munn Street Bond Stores. It was added to the New South Wales State Heritage Register on 2 April 1999.

== History ==
Shipbuilding had taken place in Munn's yard since the 1820s. John Cuthbert, a prominent boat builder, took over the yard in 1853 and it became one of the major shipyards in Sydney. During the 1870s the nature of the area changed as wool export became more significant and required an ever-increasing amount of storage space. It is likely that both buildings were built by Cuthbert. An 1870s Plan of Sydney shows the site as Dibb's wharf with two bonded stores (Block A and B). The creation of Hickson Road by the Sydney Harbour Trust facilitated the erection of Block C in 1908. Its steel sawtooth roof was added in 1953. Dalgety & Co leased the entire site from the Sydney Harbour Trust from about 1913 until 1969. Dalgety's mercantile agency became one of the biggest firms of its kind and this block came to represent their prestige on the Sydney waterfront. An existing plan from 1949 shows the three stores and the way in which they were accommodated to the shape of the site. Store B was demolished between 1970 and 1978. With the removal of the western end of Munn Street in the 1970s, the complex acquired new visibility, and has more recently been adapted to new uses.

== Description ==
The former Dalgety's Bond Stores were originally a complex of three warehouse components, known as Dalgety's Bond A, B and C. Only blocks A and C survive. Surviving features of Block B include sawn stonework, beam corbels and flashing grooves provide evidence of its attachment to the surviving buildings. Block A is an irregular gable roofed sandstone structure. Block C is a brick building almost rectangular in plan with a parapeted sawtooth south-light roof. The two buildings adjoin. To the north, facing Munn Reserve (formerly Munn Street) at the Argyle Street bridge, Blocks A and C are 2 and 1 storey in height respectively. To the south and west, however, the steep fall of the site reveals three more storeys below, addressing Hickson Road and the carpark adjacent to the wharf. In the refurbished interiors much original fabric has been kept including the heavy posts, beams and roof trusses of Block A, and the remarkable trussed girders and roof trusses of Block C.

The group consists of two complementary warehouse buildings fronting onto what is now the Munn Reserve. They both feature free classical facades but illustrate two distinct phases in warehouse construction – one incorporating a timber structure, the other steel. It contains a hydraulic pump and lift structure which is given an "A" class listing by the National Trust's IEA Committee. The bale lifts and overhead crane were fabricated by Babcock & Wilcox.

As at August 2013, the building was reported to be in fair condition, with the original detailing largely intact, both internally and externally.

=== Modifications and dates ===
Store B was demolished c. 1970–78. The face brickwork and sandstone basework have been texture finished and painted. The street front shop has been converted into a medical centre and its shopfront, like the Little Regent Street entrance and all the tiny lift lobbies, has been modernised and faced with marble tiles. All interiors are modern. A second lift and stair have been inserted at the rear, accessed by a new lobby at the east end of Little Regent Street.

A large rusticated stone archway has since been infilled. New openings in west wall (Block A). Reconstructed window and joinery. 1990s lift tower (Block A).

== Heritage listing ==
The Munn Street former warehouse complex is important as a townscape feature in this area of dramatic topography. Its different building forms and shapes display a progression of functional architectural style, reflecting the difficulties of building on this contorted terrain. It also demonstrates the redevelopment and change of the area associated with civil works that followed the bubonic plague of 1901. It perpetuates the memory of Dalgety & Co, one of Australia's largest mercantile companies, and maintains a historic link with the maritime activities of Millers Point. The internal structure and mechanical features provide additional scientific significance.

Dalgety's Bond Stores was listed on the New South Wales State Heritage Register on 2 April 1999 having satisfied the following criteria.

The place is important in demonstrating the course, or pattern, of cultural or natural history in New South Wales.

The complex demonstrates the continued importance of mercantile activities in this part of Sydney. It provides important physical evidence of the major redevelopment and associated civil works that occurred in the area in the years following the bubonic plague of 1901. It is associated with leading merchant businesses in Sydney, including John Cuthbert and Dalgety & Co. It is also an example of appropriate conservation by adaptation to new uses.

The place is important in demonstrating aesthetic characteristics and/or a high degree of creative or technical achievement in New South Wales.

The former Dalgety's Bond Stores is an important landscape feature in this area of dramatic landform, addressing two street levels. It is an interesting juxtaposition of different architectural expressions in the one ensemble representing different phases of warehouse typology, and including more recent adaptive re-use.

The place has potential to yield information that will contribute to an understanding of the cultural or natural history of New South Wales.

The former Dalgety's Bond Stores demonstrates and permits comparison of two basic types of traditional structure employing loadbearing perimeter walls and internal timber construction. Block A is a composite element displaying not only heavy timber structural members but also trussed timber girders and steel south-light external hoist sheaves.

The place possesses uncommon, rare or endangered aspects of the cultural or natural history of New South Wales.

The former Dalgety's Bond Stores is a rare and imposing complex that so clearly illustrates the evolution of warehouse development by providing evidence of changes in design, structure and function.

The place is important in demonstrating the principal characteristics of a class of cultural or natural places/environments in New South Wales.

The former Dalgety's Bond Stores is representative of the many warehouses that once abounded in this area that were associated with the harbour activities and which served the wool industry.

== See also ==
- Australian non-residential architectural styles
- Media related to Dalgety's Bond Stores at Wikimedia Commons
