= 20 Lower Fort Street, Millers Point =

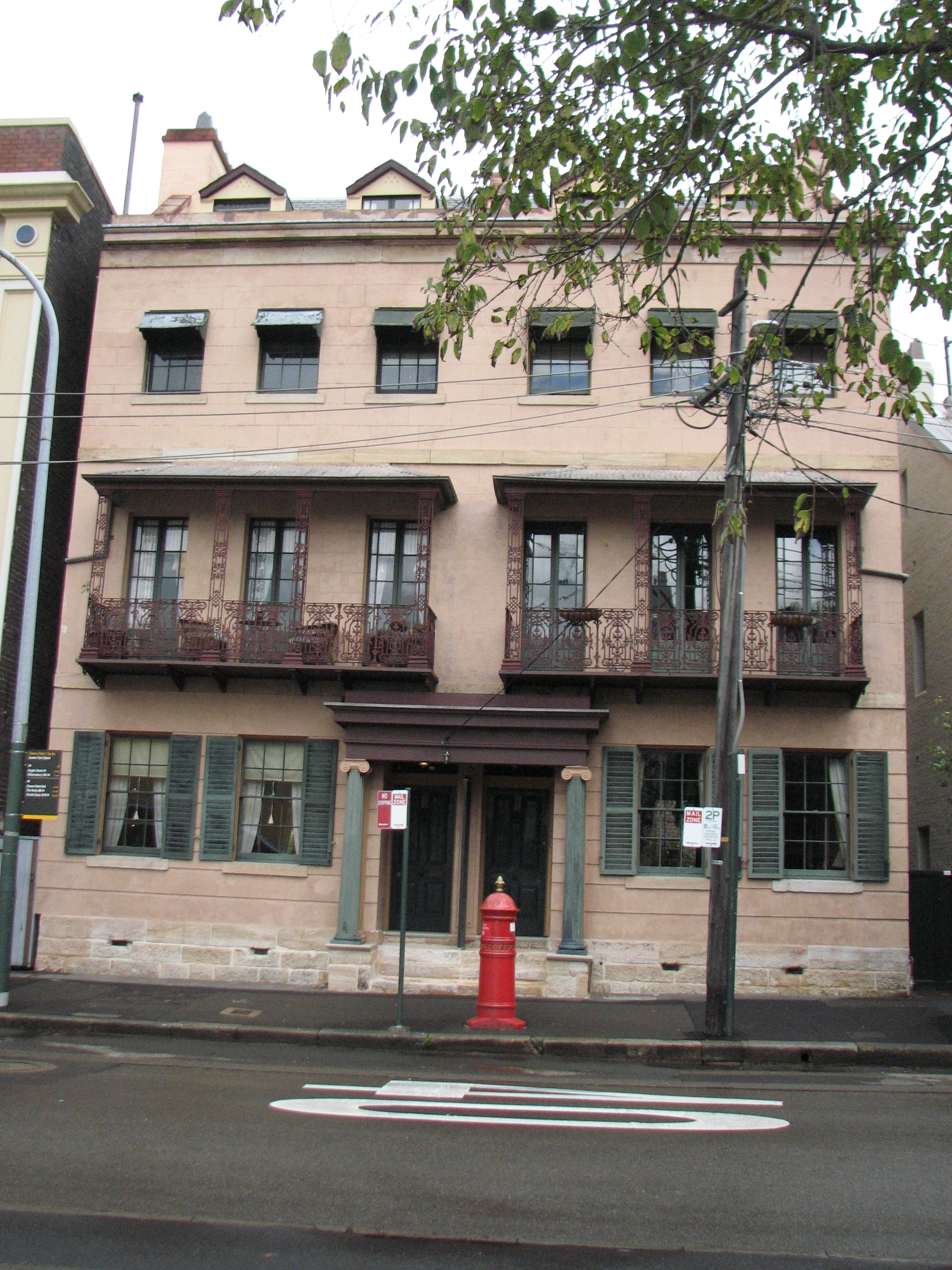
- 20–22 Lower Fort Street, Millers Point, New South Wales. No. 20 is of the left

- Location within Sydney Location within Australia
- 33.8568°S 151.2073°E
- Location: 20 Lower Fort Street, Millers Point, City of Sydney, New South Wales, Australia

Site notes
- Architectural style: Victorian Regency

New South Wales Heritage Register
- Official name: Townhouse
- Type: State heritage (built)
- Designated: 2 April 1999
- Reference no.: 861
- Type: Historic site

20 Lower Fort Street, Millers Point is a heritage-listed former residence used by the NSW State Government as a boarding house for more than 100 years but now restored and conserved to its former condition as a gentleman's residence when first built between 1841 and 1843 now located at 20 Lower Fort Street, Millers Point, City of Sydney, New South Wales, Australia. The property was added to the New South Wales State Heritage Register on 2 April 1999.

== History ==
Millers Point is one of the earliest areas of European settlement in Australia, and a focus for maritime activities. Constructed during the early 1840s as one of a pair of London style townhouses, representing a significant streetscape element. First tenanted by the NSW Department of Housing in 1983.

== Description ==
Substantial Georgian style, six bedroom townhouse, based on the London model. Four storeys with separate kitchen/servants quarters and attic. Portico with ionic columns shared with neighbour. Iron lace cantilevered balcony on second storey, onto which open three french doors. Storeys: four; Construction: Painted rendered stone, slate roof. Iron lace on timber structured balcony. Style: Georgian.

The external condition of the property is good.

=== Modifications and dates ===
External: Portico and ashlar facade added c.1863. .

== Heritage listing ==
As at 23 November 2000, this property is one of two Regency style townhouses based on the London model of four storeys with separate brick kitchen building having servants quarters above, and is in almost intact exterior condition.

It is part of the Millers Point Conservation Area, an intact residential and maritime precinct. It contains residential buildings and civic spaces dating from the 1830s and is an important example of 19th century adaptation of the landscape.

20 Lower Fort Street, Millers Point was listed on the New South Wales State Heritage Register on 2 April 1999.
