= 22–32 Argyle Place, Millers Point =

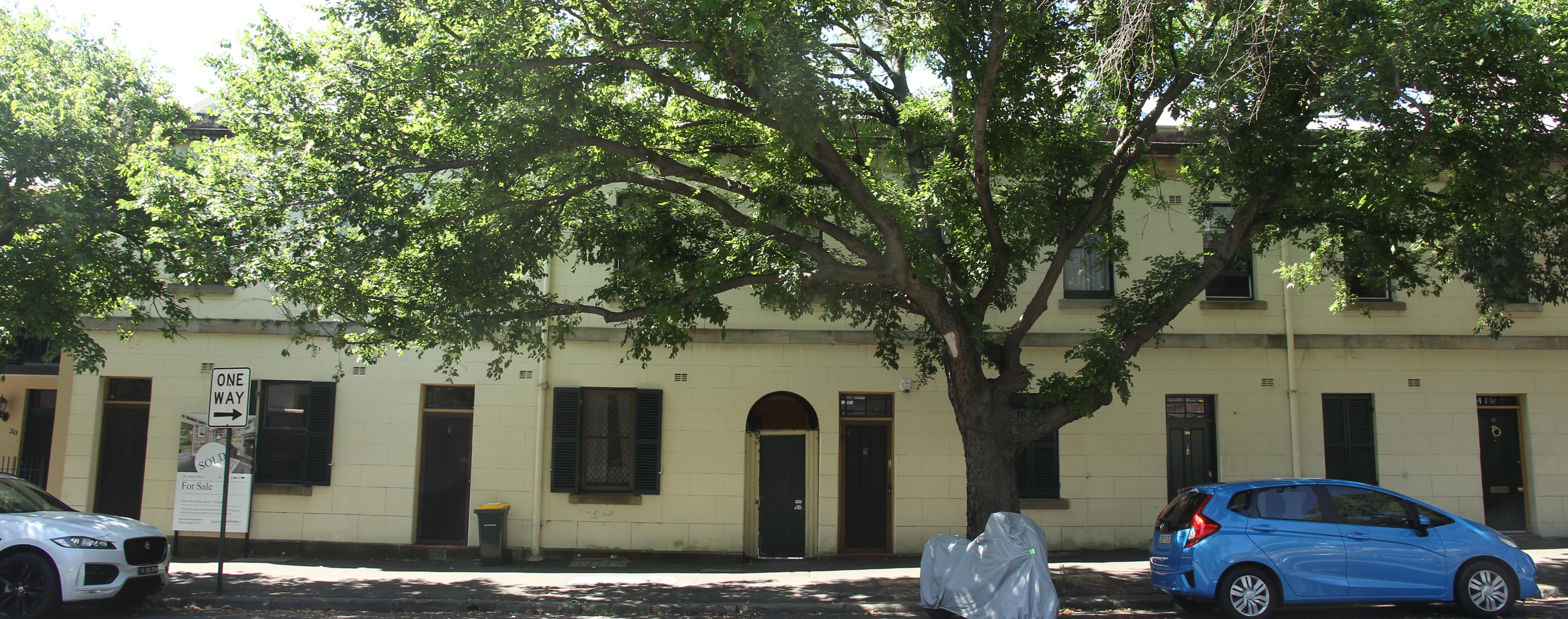
- 22–32 Argyle Place, pictured in 2019.

- Location within Sydney Location within Australia
- 33.8581°S 151.2040°E
- Location: 22, 24, 26, 30, 32 Argyle Place, Millers Point, City of Sydney, New South Wales, Australia

History
- Built: c. 1830
- Built for: William Cole

Site notes
- Architectural style: Old Colonial Georgian

New South Wales Heritage Register
- Official name: Terrace; Cole's Buildings
- Type: State heritage (built)
- Designated: 2 April 1999
- Reference no.: 905
- Type: Terrace
- Category: Residential buildings (private)

22–32 Argyle Place, also known as Cole's Buildings, is a heritage-listed row of former terrace houses and now commercial building in Millers Point, New South Wales, Australia. The property is privately owned and was added to the New South Wales State Heritage Register on 2 April 1999.

== History ==
Millers Point is one of the earliest areas of European settlement in Australia, and a focus for maritime activities. Argyle Place, a primitive version of a London Square, was commenced by Governor Macquarie but not fully formed until after quarrying of the adjacent rock face had ceased in about 1865. This row of terraces appears much as it did in the mid 19th century.

In 1958 architect John Fisher (member of the Institute of Architects, the Cumberland County Council Historic Buildings Committee and on the first Council of the National Trust of Australia (NSW) after its reformation in 1960), with the help of artist Cedric Flower, convinced Taubmans to paint the central bungalow at 50 Argyle Place. This drew attention to the importance of The Rocks for the first time. As a result, Fisher was able to negotiate leases for Bligh House (later Clydebank) and houses in Windmill Street for various medical societies.

The terrace was first tenanted by the NSW Department of Housing in 1982.

== Description ==
This mostly intact row of two-storey Georgian Terraces are of stone construction, with simple stone parapet, shingle roof and rendered stone facade. Window sills are simple stone slab and simple fan light over doorway consists of twelve small panes of glass. Storeys: Two. Construction: Painted render with face stone banding and parapet string coursing. Parging detail to walls. Corrigated galvanised iron roof. Painted timber joinery. Style: Old Colonial Georgian. Orientation: Overlooking Argyle Place.

The external condition of the property is good.

=== Modifications and dates ===
External: Minor modifications to doors and windows, services have been inappropriately added. Last inspected: 19 February 1995. Internal: Some original areas may be present.

=== Further information ===
Mostly intact c. 1830 terrace.

== Heritage listing ==
As at 23 November 2000, these early 19th century Georgian terraces are an important streetscape element facing Argyle Place. Also, the construction date may predate 1832.

It is part of the Millers Point Conservation Area, an intact residential and maritime precinct. It contains residential buildings and civic spaces dating from the 1830s and is an important example of 19th century adaptation of the landscape.

The terrace of houses at 24–32 Argyle Place, part of the Cole's Building, and the adjacent townhouse Osborne House (No. 34), are the only survivors of the series of buildings in The Rocks and Millers Point constructed by local publican William Cole in the mid-1840s. The terrace of houses is a rare surviving example of modest housing built shortly after the introduction of building regulations in Sydney, and it retains the character, layout and detailing of modest housing of the period. The Cole's Building is a rare combination of a terrace and town house built for the same owner. No other surviving mid-1840s examples have been located. As individual buildings, they are highly significant as rare surviving examples of modest Colonial Georgian houses, demonstrating the effect of the Sydney and London Building Acts which sought to control the spread of fire by controlling the materials and design of town houses in tight urban environments. The houses are an integral part of Millers Point, the earliest residential precinct in Australia still in residential use today, which is of State and are likely to be of national significance. They form an important visual component of this precinct, being highly visible from Argyle Place at the front and from the harbour, the North Shore and parts of Windmill Street at the rear.

22–32 Argyle Place, Millers Point was listed on the New South Wales State Heritage Register on 2 April 1999 having satisfied the following criteria.

The place is important in demonstrating the course, or pattern, of cultural or natural history in New South Wales.

Providing evidence of the second phase of development of Millers Point, the construction of town houses and terrace houses by wealthy tradesmen as an investment, indicating the transition from penal settlement to a free market economy, a transition that probably contributed to Cole's bankruptcy.

The place has a strong or special association with a person, or group of persons, of importance of cultural or natural history of New South Wales's history.

Associated with a prominent local publican and property developer William Cole. Later associated with the Merriman family.

The place is important in demonstrating aesthetic characteristics and/or a high degree of creative or technical achievement in New South Wales.

The proportions and overall design of the terrace of houses (together with the grander punctuation mark of "Osborne House" built as a part of the same terrace of houses) reflects the simple aesthetic of the Georgian period.

The later modifications of the window joinery and (first layer of) stucco render to the front facade show the changing tastes of the Victorian period as the owner sought to "modernise" the rental properties to maintain their fashionability and, hence, their income. The importance of the houses have long been identified as being historically and aesthetically important by virtue of their early listing by the National Trust of Australia (NSW) and their early inclusion on the (now defunct) Register of the National Estate.

Cole's Buildings clearly show the introduction of standard town house forms and planning that, in turn, show the impact of both the London and Sydney Building Acts such as in the use of non-combustible materials, parapets, no overhanging eaves, the size of external and party walls, area of the Ground Floor, and no penetration of external walls by joists. The high standard of construction resulted in the retention of the buildings following the Resumption.

The place has a strong or special association with a particular community or cultural group in New South Wales for social, cultural or spiritual reasons.

The descendants of long-standing former tenants and the current (2014) long-term tenants have a very strong attachment to the Cole's Building, Argyle Place and to Millers Point in general.

The place has potential to yield information that will contribute to an understanding of the cultural or natural history of New South Wales.

Cole's Buildings are an integral part of Argyle Place, which is a rare example of housing built fronting an enclosed park.

The place possesses uncommon, rare or endangered aspects of the cultural or natural history of New South Wales.

Cole's Buildings are a rare surviving example of a group of houses dating from the 1840s built as an investment rather than owner-occupied.

The place is important in demonstrating the principal characteristics of a class of cultural or natural places/environments in New South Wales.

A number of the original details of Cole's Buildings survive, including some window sashes, staircases, fireplace surrounds and roof shingles. What is particularly important is the comparison between the modest houses at Nos. 24–32 and the larger townhouse at No. 34.

== See also ==
- Australian residential architectural styles
- Osborne House, 34 Argyle Place
