= Undercliffe Terrace =

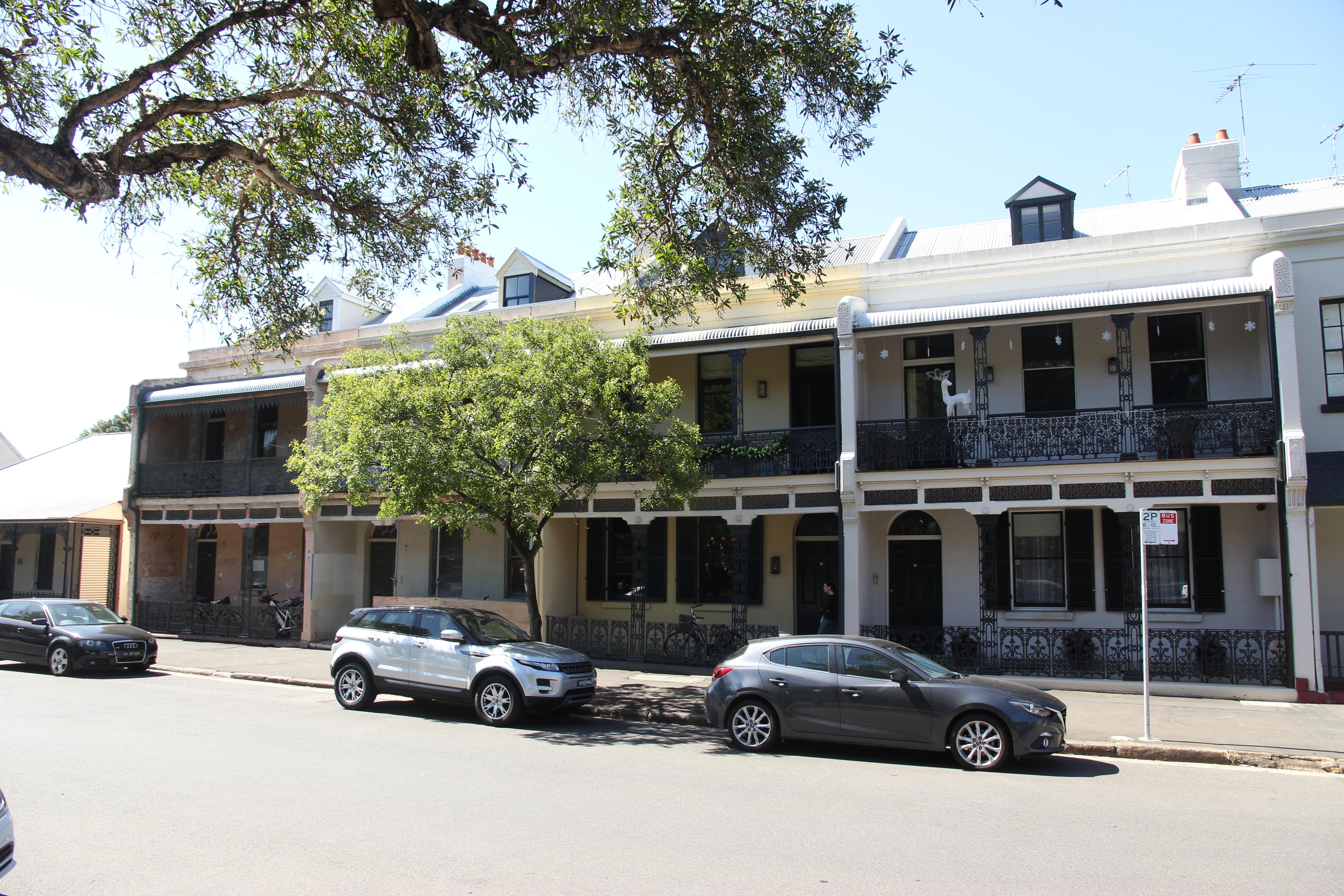
- 52–60 Argyle Place, pictured in 2019

- Location within Sydney Location within Australia
- 33.8581°S 151.2051°E
- Location: 52, 54, 56, 58, 60 Argyle Place, Millers Point, City of Sydney, New South Wales, Australia

History
- Built: c. 1840

Site notes
- Architectural styles: Victorian Georgian; Victorian Filigree; Victorian Italianate

New South Wales Heritage Register
- Official name: Undercliffe Terrace; Grimes' Buildings
- Type: State heritage (built)
- Designated: 2 April 1999
- Reference no.: 902
- Type: Historic site

Undercliffe Terrace is a heritage-listed row of terrace houses located at 52–60 Argyle Place, in the inner city Sydney suburb of Millers Point in the City of Sydney local government area of New South Wales, Australia. The property is also known as Grimes' Buildings. was added to the New South Wales State Heritage Register on 2 April 1999.

== History ==
Millers Point is one of the earliest areas of European settlement in Australia, and a focus for maritime activities. Argyle Place, a primitive version of a London Square, was commenced by Governor Macquarie but not fully formed until after quarrying of the adjacent rock face had ceased in about 1865.

In 1958 architect John Fisher (member of the Institute of Architects, the Cumberland County Council Historic Buildings Committee and on the first Council of the National Trust of Australia (NSW) after its reformation in 1960), with the help of artist Cedric Flower, convinced Taubmans to paint the central bungalow at 50 Argyle Place. This drew attention to the importance of The Rocks for the first time. As a result, Fisher was able to negotiate leases for Bligh House (later Clydebank) and houses in Windmill Street for various medical societies.

The terrace was first tenanted by the NSW Department of Housing in 1991.

== Description ==
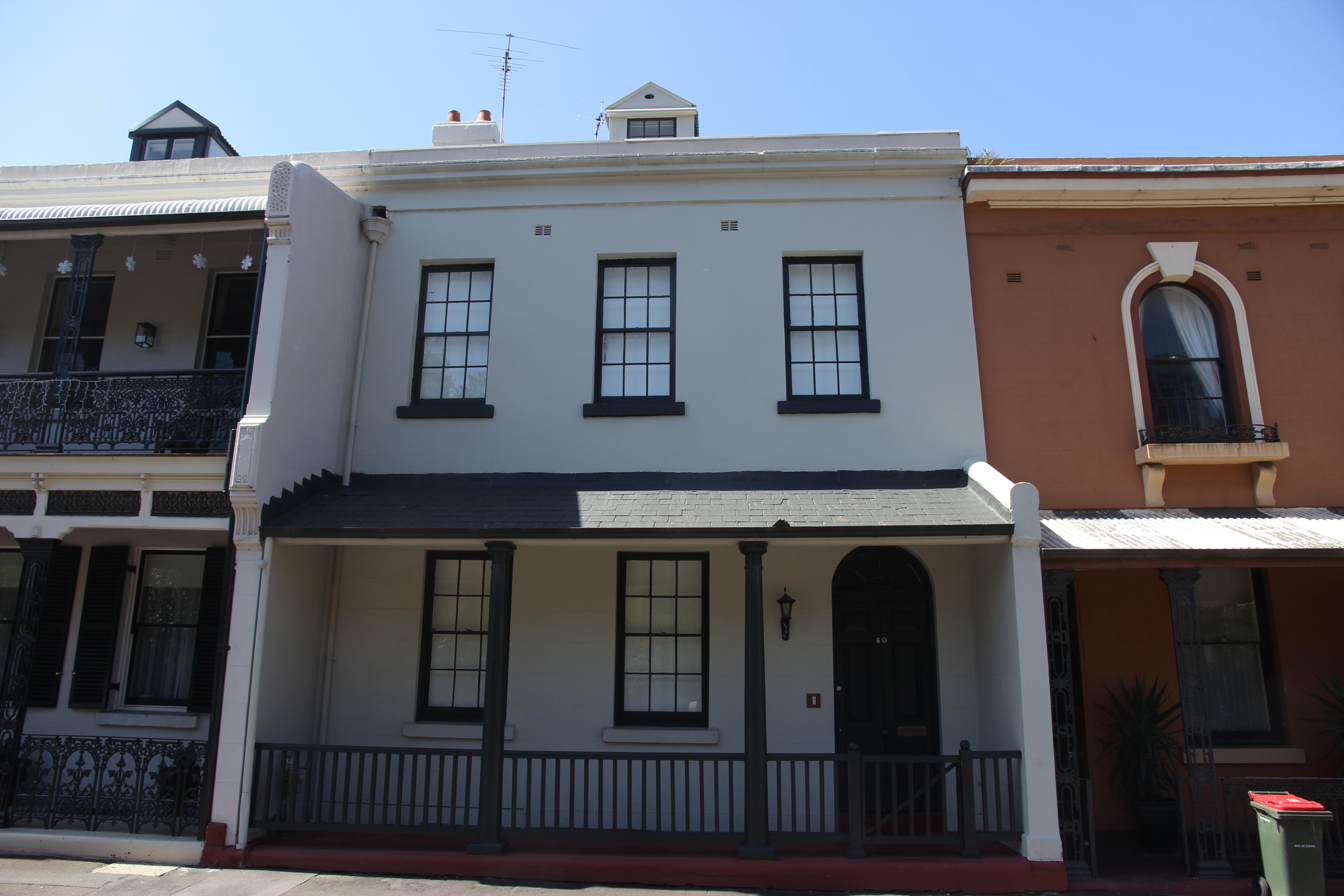
60 Argyle Place, pictured in 2019.

Large Victorian Georgian terrace with Victorian detail added, contains seven bedsitting rooms and is last of a row constructed c. 1840. This two storey (plus attic) building has double hung sash windows with stone sills, a bull-nose galvanised iron verandah roof, a simple parapet above, cast iron balustrades and columns, french doors on second storey and fan lights above doorways. Storeys: Three; Construction: Paint finished rendered masonry with decorative iron lace columns and balustrading both floors. Painted timber verandah beams with iron lace with frieze underneath. Corrigated galvanised iron roof, painted timber joinery. Style: Georgian (with Victorian Italianate additions) Orientation: Overlooking Argyle Place.

The terraces are also believed to have been completed in the Victorian Filigree style.

The external condition of the property is good.

=== Modifications and dates ===
- External: Dormer windows added (c. 1860), late Victorian Italianate two-storey verandahs and render to exterior walls (c. 1870). 20th century addition at rear. Last inspected: 19 February 1995.
- Internal: Repairs needed to some verandah boards, dormer structure, windows and ironwork.

== Heritage listing ==
As at 23 November 2000, this 1840s terrace, altered in later Victorian times to include Italianate verandahs and windows, forms part of an important streetscape element facing Argyle Place.

It is part of the Millers Point Conservation Area, an intact residential and maritime precinct. It contains residential buildings and civic spaces dating from the 1830s and is an important example of 19th century adaptation of the landscape.

Undercliffe Terrace was listed on the New South Wales State Heritage Register on 2 April 1999.

== See also ==
- Australian residential architectural styles
- Undercliffe Cottage, 50 Argyle Place
- 62–64 Argyle Place
