= Tulkiyan =

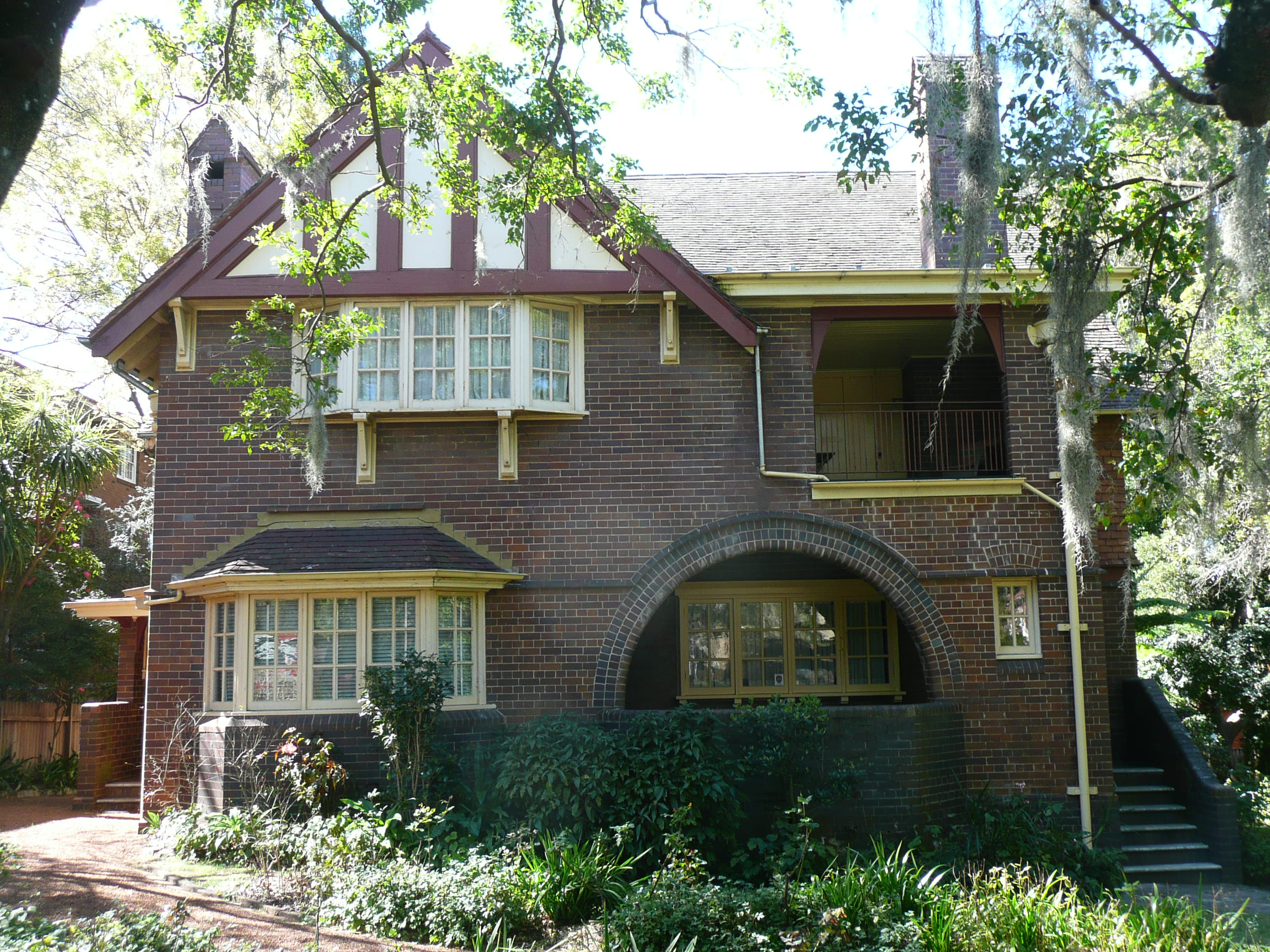
- Tulkiyan, pictured in August 2009.

- Location within Sydney Location within Australia
- 33°45′28″S 151°09′14″E
- Location: 707 Pacific Highway, Gordon, Ku-ring-gai Council, New South Wales, Australia

Site notes
- Architect(s): Bertrand James Waterhouse (Waterhouse and Lake)
- Architectural style: Federation Arts and Crafts
- Owner: Ku-ring-gai Council

New South Wales Heritage Register
- Official name: Tulkiyan
- Type: state heritage (complex / group)
- Designated: 27 May 2005
- Reference no.: 1733
- Type: House
- Category: Residential buildings (private)
- Builders: Mr Ochs; garden laid out by Mr Mottram

Tulkiyan is a heritage-listed former suburban residence and former house museum at 707 Pacific Highway, in the Sydney suburb of Gordon in the Ku-ring-gai Council local government area of New South Wales, Australia. It was designed by Bertrand James Waterhouse of Waterhouse and Lake, and built by Mr Ochs; garden laid out by Mr Mottram. The property is owned by Ku-ring-gai Council. It was added to the New South Wales State Heritage Register on 27 May 2005.

== History ==
=== Gordon district ===
Historians are uncertain about the origin of the name Gordon. Like Willoughby, it probably commemorates General Sir James Willoughby Gordon who, as the quartermaster-general in England when the First Fleet sailed for NSW in 1787, would have been responsible for outfitting the fleet.

One of Gordon's pioneer settlers was Robert McIntosh, who is commemorated by McIntosh Street. In 1832 he planted an orchard, which was situated opposite today's St. John's Anglican Church, on the corner of St. John's Avenue and the Pacific Highway. Another pioneer was John Brown, known as the Squire, who through his trade as a timber-cutter, became prosperous. He first acquired land in the 1850s on the site of the present Ravenswood Methodist Ladies' College. This was also site of the first post office, which opened in 1860, and the brick cottage that housed it still stands in the school grounds. Because the suburb was part of the area known as Lane Cove, this was the name of the first post office. The confusion that resulted caused it to be renamed Gordon in 1879, and the site of the post office was changed.

Brown's ambition was to own a square mile of land and to this end he acquired several parcels, until by 1870 he had bought land as far down the North Shore as St.Leonards, where he had a large timber yard.

St. John's Church of England, Gordon is another historic point of interest. It was built in 1872 and its rectory in the 1890s. In 1817 Governor Macquarie donated (pounds) 10 towards the building of a small wooden structure, which came to be used as a church, community centre and meeting place. A larger 1832 church was destroyed by bushfire in 1862 and an 1873 church designed by Edmund Blacket was begun and later expanded as the parish grew.

When the railway was extended to the North Shore in the 1890s, these suburbs experienced enormous growth and suburbanisation. A subsequent increase in subdivision and land sales changed the character of the area, attracting affluent residents with a tendency to build large houses on substantial areas of land. In due course, many of these estates were further subdivided, and further homes constructed on smaller parcels of land ('Bill').

The Gordon railway station opened in 1890. A shire encompassing the area from Willoughby to Hornsby was formed in 1906 and called Ku-Ring-Gai, after the Chase, which had been established in 1894. In 1928 it became a municipality with its headquarters in Gordon (designed by architect, artist and writer, William Hardy-Wilson) on the Pacific Highway.

=== Tulkiyan ===
Tulkiyan was built on part of the 16 hectares (40 acres) of land that had been granted to Michael Ansell on 30 June 1823. In 1824, the 40 acres was sold to William Fowler, who then leased it to Messrs. Giles and Ritchie. It was further mortgaged to Samuel Lyons, an auctioneer, who, in 1843, finally disposed of the property to Robert McIntosh II who was already a landowner and occupier of other substantial properties in old Lane Cove.

Following ownership by Hanna McIntosh, 12 hectares (30 acres) of this land was offered for subdivision in 1895 as Deposited Plan 3267. Lavinia McIntosh obtained title to Lot 3 of Section 1 in 1906, selling to George Chapman in 1912 who in turn transferred his title to Mrs Mary Donaldson in 1913.

In 1913, Lot 1 Section of the McIntosh estate was purchased by Mrs Mary Donaldson, wife of merchant William Donaldson, who ran the City Free Stores in Kent Street, Sydney (along with three other properties located opposite, between the present Bushlands Avenue and St. John's Church). The land was one rood, 32 perches in area, and accessible to the railway station. The choice of lot by Mary and William Donaldson was made because of its location: half-way between the Chatswood and Warrawee Bowling Clubs.

Mary Donaldson had admired the houses of several of her friends built by architect B. J. Waterhouse of Waterhouse & Lake Architects. Shortly afterwards the Donaldsons commissioned B. J. Waterhouse of Waterhouse & Lake Architects to design their new home. The original cost of the house was £2,147. The house was designed as a two-storey villa, constructed in brick with a terracotta shingle roof, and designed so that the majority of rooms had their own private outdoor area or patio. Homes opposite the Donaldson property, between the present Bushlands Avenue (formerly Gertrude Avenue) and St John's Church were Cranbrook (occupier Patrick Deery), Kai-Ora, (occupier George West), and Kinawanna (occupier Rev George Brown, a Methodist missionary). The Ku-ring-gai Shire Council was also temporarily occupying the St John's Church of England Hall, a wooden building facing the main street.

A year after the house was completed, 1916, a timber framed garage was built near the north-west corner of the house, to accommodate Mr Donaldson's first car, a Studebaker. This was subsequently demolished because of white ant activity following Council's acceptance of the property (in 1985). It is understood that Mr Donaldson attempted to extend the curtilage of the property to the east, however the neighbour Mr Underwood who used his property as a market garden declined to sell off any of his land.

Mary Donaldson's three children inherited the property in 1950. Margaret Helen Scott Donaldson obtained title in 1975, on the death of her sister, Mary Isabella (Maisie), retaining title until the July 1985 Deed of Trust transferred ownership to Ku-ring-gai Council.

=== The Donaldson family ===
Mary Donaldson had been born Mary Scott, descended from the family of Mungo Scott, a successful flour miller, of Melbourne. The Donaldsons moved to Sydney around 1900 when Mr Donaldson took up a position as accountant at the new Mungo Scott Flour Mill at Haberfield (now Summer Hill) - the mill was opened by his father-in-law. The Scott family was a family of means, and Mary Donaldson had, until her death, title to Tulkiyan. Miss Donaldson's father came from a family of lesser means, and was a banker prior to his marriage into the Scott family.

William and Mary Donaldson had three children: William Jnr. ('Bill'), Mary Isabella (Maisie), Margaret Helen Scott. None of the children married. Margaret Donaldson moved to Tulkiyan at age 10, when the home was completed in 1914. She lived there all her life.

The house continued in family ownership until 1994, when Margaret died (aged 91) and based on her wishes, Tulkiyan became the property of Ku-ring-gai Municipal council for the use of the community. The (property and) house was acquired (the title deeds of the property and ownership of much of the contents were transferred by Margaret to Ku-Ring-Gai Municipal Council in 1985 with a provision for life tenancy; i.e. Council received the house in a fully furnished condition.

A detailed summary report on the property was prepared in 1987, a detailed inventory in 1994, a valuation of important artefacts in 1996, a conservation management plan in 1998 and a plan of management in 2000. Council agreed to form a committee to assist with the management of the property in June 2002 and the Tulkiyan Management Advisory Committee has been active since, assisting with management issues, overseeing works associated with grant funding and the process of placing a custodian/caretaker in the house. The property has been open for public inspection on a casual basis. Over the last decade a consensus emerged that the property was being under-used as a public asset. A number of tentative steps were attempted to overcome this situation, including recruitment of a caretaker (discontinued after a short period) and the preparation of a discussion paper on the future of use of the property. Resolving the future of the property has emerged as a priority for Council. There is also a specific concern that the implementation of measures designed to increase community use be matched by increased earned revenue. A detailed electronic inventory of all material held at Tulkiyan was prepared in 2002 (536 individual records) and an Interpretation Plan for the property in 2002-3.

=== The house ===
As the house has remained in the one family, and as the family did not have any need for major change, little structural alteration was made over the years. B.J. Waterhouse himself was summoned in the early stages to advise on minor details. The family nicknamed him "Mr Monday Tuesday" because of his tendency to say that he would come on Monday or Tuesday, and then fail to turn up. He also had no car and the family used to suggest that one of the reasons he failed to come was because he was waiting to be called for. The Donaldsons were introduced to B.J. Waterhouse through their friendship with Mrs A. B. Davidson of Neutral Bay.

=== The garden ===
1914 photographs of the house and setting show a site devoid of significant vegetation. According to (Miss Donaldson) oral history accounts, the property had been used previously for grazing cattle owned by the McIntosh family. According to the same source, B. J. Waterhouse designed the front fence and garden incorporating, it is believed, the design of the front path to the lych gate, the planting of lily pilly (Acmena/Syzygium smithii) on either side of the gate and the driveway entrance to a non-existent garage (built a year after occupation, by an unspecified builder.

The garage was not designed by Waterhouse but "put up" by one, "Teddy". William's friend, Mr Bond, had persuaded him to buy a Studebaker. Later, William bought a Dodge.

The location of the vegetable gardens, planted to the rear of the property, and the tennis court, towards the south, were also planned by the architect.

According to Miss Donaldson, the (front) garden was designed by B. J. Waterhouse and laid out by a Mr Mottram of Fox Valley Road. The front brick wall, drive gates and the main entrance lych gate are most important elements as part of the original design together with the gravel path and drive. Later gardeners were Mr Edwards and a Mr Colbert who also worked on the garden at Eryldene (nearby in Mackintosh Street, Gordon).

Again, according to Miss Donaldson, Mary planted bouvardias, irises and columbines (Aquilegia sp./cv.s) in (front) garden beds and the garden itself was "made and remade" several times. She recalled that bouvardias were among the original annuals planted (actually these are a perennial shrub but frost tender - perhaps they were discarded each year and more bought the following season) (pers.comm, Stuart Read, 7 July 2008)). Bill planted irises in the back garden. Chinese gardeners also worked in the back garden, planting vegetables along the fence line.

The same oral history source also provided the information that the family became keen supporters of the planting of indigenous species in the garden, an interest which complemented Mary's existing interest in the Federation Arts and Crafts movement. This is confirmed by plant invoices and a library of books describing native plants.

The garden contains a number of mature trees, particularly on the southern boundary. Some rainforest trees date back to the beginning of the garden, others were planted in the 1940s by Dr William (Bill) Donaldson - he was the plant enthusiast of the family. Bill served in World War 1, then trained as a doctor and practiced in Beecroft. He later returned to Tulkiyan after his parents' deaths and spent much of his retirement time in the garden. Many native trees are rainforest species, some rare.

Bill Donaldson, after he retired, continued Mary's interest in native plants, and a number of indigenous plants can be dated to the 1960s after he retired and returned to the family home. The first and only comprehensive analysis of the garden was undertaken by David Costello, Manager of Parks & Reserves for Ku-Ring-Gai Municipal Council in 1986, after Council obtained title to the property. Costello's plan notes that Margaret had a remarkable memory for the botanical names of many rainforest species, many of which have had their names superseded (changed) since planting. At this time the garden was also visited by rainforest specialists from the Department of Forestry, who commented on the importance of the plantings.

From the beginning a Mr Grundy did odd jobs around the house, both in the garden, and in the house. He came from North Sydney, and was not associated with any large firm. When any maintenance work was undertaken, the Donaldson family always attempted to retain the original character of the building, preserving not only original specifications, but details of costs of painting jobs and repair works. Additional roof tiles were stored under the house, and all original gas fittings were retained.

A 1986 audit was done of the garden, listing all trees and shrubs at that time (see file). It noted that the 2 lily-pilly trees at the front fence were planted in 1915, and that another different lily pilly, Acmena ingens (syn.A.australis ssp.brachyandra) (with large red fruits) was planted in the 1940s - this one having large red fruits. Many of the receipts of the now mature plantings were kept by Miss Donaldson, whose brother Bill was the plant enthusiast. She had a remarkable memory for plant names and was able to assist in identifying a number of the rainforest tree species. Many of these have had name changes since the time of planting (Acmena changing to Syzygium for example). Shrubs throughout the garden include Prunus spp., azaleas (Rhododendron indicum cv.s), Chinese lanterns (Abutilon sp.), Kaffir lilies (Clivea spp.), lasiandras (Tibouchina spp.), spider flowers (Grevillea spp.), roses and wind flowers (Anemone spp.).

Under the direction of Zeny Edwards, with plants supplied by Ku-Ring-Gai Municipal Council and Parkers Nursery, and with the assistance of the Friends of Tulkiyan, the front garden ribbon beds have been planted out and the vegetable garden at the rear revived. Council staff keep the lawn mown and edges trimmed. The custodian keeps the garden, with assistance from Friends of Tulkiyan.

=== Bertrand James (B.J.) Waterhouse ===
Bertrand James Waterhouse OBE, known to his friends and colleagues as B.J., was born in Leeds in 1876 and came to Australia with his family when he was 16 years old. He gained his architectural training at Sydney Technical College under the tutelage of John Sulman. At this time (1892) Waterhouse was articled to the English architect John B. Spencer who designed the Strand Arcade. He subsequently worked in the office of W. L. Vernon, Government Architect, until he entered private practice with J. W. H. Lake in 1907 or 1908. During its first decade of practice, the firm designed many houses in the Neutral Bay-Cremorne-Mosman areas, which was being developed rapidly as a "desirable" harbourside residential locality. His career in domestic architecture was to span some 50 years.

Waterhouse often utilised shapes, textures, solids and voids into seemingly casual, informal architecture, with a focus on cultivating a comfortable space without unnecessary detail.

Waterhouse in his early architecture followed the precepts of the English Arts and Crafts movement and his work has a close affinity to that of Voysey, Bailey Scott and Macintosh.

Waterhouse could be described as the Sydney equivalent of English architect C. F. A. Voysey, whose Arts and Crafts houses in England were widely admired in the early twentieth century. A typical Waterhouse residence featured asymmetrical, picturesque massing, strongly expressed roofs, usually with dominant gables; porches, balconies and verandahs; and at least one facetted oriel or bay external wall finish, together with areas of timber shingling or tile-hanging. Inside, the main rooms displayed timber wainscoting on the walls and heavy timber beams below the ceilings.

He continued to design in this manner until the early 1920s. In his later years Waterhouse designed residences in the Spanish Mission Style. Waterhouse died, aged 90, in 1965.

Tulkiyan was opened to the public as a house-museum by Ku-Ring-Gai Municipal Council. It was closed to the public in 2012 because of public safety concerns. Council is looking for a manager of the property, to operate it as a house museum.

The Historic Houses Association of Australia (HAA) announced in late 2016 that they have entered an agreement with Ku-Ring-Gai Council to manage Tulkiyan House.

== Description ==
Tulkiyan is a remarkably intact survivor of a distinctive phase in the development of domestic architecture in Australia. It is a substantial two storey brick residence located on the north eastern side of the Pacific Highway at Gordon.

=== Site and garden ===
The site is 0.53 hectares (1.32 acres). It is bounded by paling fences to the west, north and east, while the southern (Pacific Highway) boundary is a brick fence with timber infill panels (this was replaced in 2007 with a timber retaining wall).

The main entrance to Tulkiyan is through a timber gate located under a brick arch with terracotta tile detail in keeping with the detailing of the main house. Two large lily pilly trees frame the brick lych gate to the Pacific Highway front. The gravel driveway (edged with a low brick wall; and a stone wall to its north) is located at the north-western corner of the site, and is entered through this pair of timbered gates. The driveway leads to a garage north-east of the house's rear corner. The gravel path curves across the block towards the front door, joining up with the driveway. On the southern side of the house a sandstone path leads to the rear. An area of lawn is to the house's west, south-west and south. In the lawn to the house's south-east are two beds of roses. A rear garden behind the garage has a shed, incinerator, compost heaps, brick path and areas of garden beds, more lawn and trees lining the north-eastern, eastern and southern boundaries.

A layout plan of the garden was prepared in 1987, identifying all plantings (trees, shrubs, herbaceous plants).

According to Miss Donaldson, the garden was designed by B. J. Waterhouse and laid out by a Mr Mottram of Fox Valley Road, but has been modified several times. Later gardeners were Mr Edwards and Mr Colbert who also worked at Eryldene nearby.

The front brick wall, drive gates and the main entrance lych gate are most important elements as part of the original design together with the gravel path and drive.

The front fence of brick and timber complements the house. The original front gate is beneath a brick arch with terracotta shingled hood similar the chimneys. Matching timber gates on the driveway are engraved with the name. The garage was not designed by Waterhouse but "put up" by one "Teddy". This has been demolished.

The original front garden layout and the pea gravel driveway and path remain, along with remnants of the original garden and early plantings. The red gravel path with brick edges curves diagonally to the north to the front door at the driveway, with ribbon beds on either side. Bouvardias were amongst the original annuals planted, later columbines. In later years Miss Donaldson liked colourful annuals here, and chided the Council to hurry up and plant each season after they had started to do some of the maintenance when she had signed the house over, but still had residence. Two large green glazed frogs sat on the front porch and their positions indicated whether Miss Donaldson wanted visitors or not. There is still a bed of small pink floribunda roses that Miss Donaldson used to pot up for visitors.

The two almost symmetrical lily pilly trees on either side of the main gate were apparently planted in 1914 and dominate the front, draped in Spanish moss (Tillandsia sp.). The garden contains a number of mature trees, particularly on the southern boundary. Many of the Australian species are believed to have been planted by Dr William (Bill) Donaldson (son of the original owners) in the 1940s - he was the plant enthusiast of the family. William Jnr. ('Bill') served in World War I, later trained as a doctor and practiced in Beecroft. He later returned to Tulkiyan after his parents' deaths and spent much of his retirement time in the garden. Many native trees are rainforest species, some rare. Lists of (all native) plants date from 1940s-1952.

Roses and cottage perennials dominate, as it is maintained by monthly working bees and a few hours work by Council staff. Three miniature pomegranates are planted as they feature in the plaster ceilings of the morning and drawing rooms, while the dining room design shows the fruit ripe and split open.

The site has a substantial (eastern) side garden with a sandstone crazy paved path to stairs to the side verandah, which features a compartment accessible to the pantry to deliver bread, milk and meat. The back lawn is flattened, originally a tennis court, now featuring a mature macadamia, a Barklya syringifolia and new sandstone edging around 2 sides, built by Council. The other half is the site of the bricked vegetable beds, a lemon tree, formerly a picking garden and lawn, originally with clothes prop line, now removed. Chinese gardeners planted vegetables along the fence line and later Bill planted irises here. The vegetable garden remained important to Miss Margaret and even at the end of her life she still had rhubarb and strawberries. "Mr Grundy" came from North Sydney to do odd jobs in the garden and in the house.

Early photographs show the block empty of vegetation, (there were vegetable gardens and a cow paddock over the fence) in contrast to today's towering rainforest trees (see below).

Native species of trees (featuring huge rainforest trees along the back and sides) and shrubs include:

- lily pilly (Acmena smithii),
- an enormous Acmena ingens (syn.A.australis ssp.brachyandra) (with large red fruits - this specimen planted in the 1940s), Pararchidendron pruinosum / Abarema saphidoides (snow wood tulip siris),
- brush bloodwood (Baloghia inophylla),
- forest oak (Allocasuarina torulosa),
- aniseed myrtle (Backhousia anisata),
- gold blossom tree (Barklya syringifolia),
- Illawarra flame tree (Brachychiton acerifolium),
- coachwood (Ceratopetalum apetalum),
- sassafras (Doryphora sassafras),
- blue quandong (Elaeocarpus grandis),
- blueberry ash (E.reticulatus),
- brush box (Lophostemon confertus),
- lemon-scented gum (Corymbia citriodora),
- spotted gum (C.maculata),
- lemon scented tea tree (Leptospermum petersonii),
- cheese tree (Glochidion ferdinandii),
- spider flower (Grevillea oleiodes),
- silky oak (G.robusta),
- native frangipani (Hymenosporum flavum),
- Queensland nut (Macadamia tetraphylla),
- brown pine (Podocarpus elatus),
- firewheel tree (Stenocarpus sinuatus),
- broad leaved paperbark (Melaleuca quinquenervia)
- Syzygium floribundum (weeping lily pilly/satinash),
- Harpulia pendula (tulipwood) and
- weeping lily pilly (Waterhousia floribunda).
- There are also a smaller tuckeroo (Cupaniopsis anacardioides),
- tree fern (Cyathea cooperi)
- and a young Buckinghamia celsissima planted by the mayor for the centenary of Ku-ring-Gai Council.

Exotic trees and shrubs include: fried egg tree (Gordonia axillaris), Hibiscus sp., jacaranda (J.mimosifolia), crepe myrtle (Lagerstroemia indica), tree tulip (Magnolia sp.), crab apple (Malus sp.), cherry (Prunus sp.), cherry plum (P.x blireana) and sweet bay/bay laurel (Laurus nobilis).

Shrubs throughout the garden include Prunus spp., azaleas (Rhododendron indicum cv.s), camellia (C.japonica cv.), Chinese lanterns (Abutilon sp.), Rondeletia amoena with pink flowers and fringe flower (Loropetalum chinense).

Ground cover plants include Kaffir lilies (Clivea spp.), lasiandras (Tibouchina spp.), roses and wind flowers (Anemone spp.).

Under the direction of Zeny Edwards, with plants supplied by Ku-Ring-Gai Municipal Council and Parkers Nursery, and with the assistance of the Friends of Tulkiyan, the front garden ribbon beds have been planted out and the vegetable garden at the rear revived. Council staff keep the lawn mown and edges trimmed. The custodian keeps the garden, with assistance from Friends of Tulkiyan.

=== House ===
The house is designed in the Federation Arts and Crafts style by B. J. Waterhouse. Tulkiyan is an important intact example of Waterhouse's work. The house is asymmetrical with an all embracing roof line covering balconies and verandahs. All major rooms downstairs and bedrooms upstairs have access to verandahs and sleeping out was "an activity seen as being conducive to health". Tulkiyan means "gable" in Gaelic.

Tulkiyan is a face brick building with steeply pitched terracotta shingled roof and tall chimneys finished with gabled shingled caps. The roof gables are either hung with terracotta shingles or half timbered with bracketed eaves. The main entry is on the northern side of the house via a covered porch which opens under the staircase.

The ground floor includes a stair hall, morning room, living room, dining room, kitchen, pantries and maids' room, while the first floor contains the four bedrooms, a bathroom and lavatory. A wide verandah on the eastern side of the house opens off the dining room and overlooks the side garden and former tennis court lawn. Each of the four bedrooms on the first floor has built in cupboards and opens onto a separate balcony. These were often used at this period for sleeping out, an activity seen as being conducive to good health.

The interior of the house includes some good examples of Edwardian joinery and hardware., including a built in sideboard accessible from both the dining room and the kitchen and a fine timber stair. The original timber front entry gate is located below a brick arch with a terracotta shingled hood detail similar to that on the chimneys. A matching pair of timber vehicular gates at the driveway entry in engraved with the name Tulkiyan, an aboriginal word meaning "happy memories". The original layout of the front garden and the pea gravel driveway remain together with remnants of the original garden and early plantings around the house.

Tulkiyan is typical of Waterhouse's distinctive Edwardian houses. In his writing he advocated simplicity and straightforwardness in house planning. The house has a remarkable flow of simple spaces on the ground floor and an economy of planning.

As in Waterhouse's other domestic designs, the dominant, all embracing roof is a considerable technical achievement dominating the building. It broods over the general mass of the house unifying all its separate parts. Waterhouse wrote: 'The cast shadow on rough cast or brick broken by the light on glass and shutter is most beautiful, and the unifying value of the shadow is very great Balconies and verandahs should either be absorbed within the structural bounding lines of the mass, or be large enough to avoid that meagre and disjointed appearance so detrimental to the design, and should provide sufficient space for living or sleeping and out accommodation now so customary.'

The principal wall material unlike many of Waterhouse's contemporary designs is a dark mahogany/brown brick combined with beautiful red/brown plane tiles and gables which are heavily half-timbered and pargetted with rough cast. Interestingly, Waterhouse was to choose a similar brick when he built his own house "The Gables" in Neutral Bay - between 1920 and 1923. The tall chimneys have their own gabled roofs and are almost a trademark of a Waterhouse design from this period. The large semi-circular arch which defined the front verandah of Tulkiyan echoes a favourite architectural motif of the great American architect, Henry Hobson Richardson.

All the outdoor spaces are nicely "absorbed" into the mass. Each room has an adjacent outdoor space with the necessary requisite for "sleeping out".

The house is approached from a side entrance porch into a large entry and stair hall around which radiate the principal ground floor rooms. To the right through sliding doors is the morning room with a small ingle and a picturesque window seat in a projecting bay.

A door opens onto an ample verandah enclosed by a large semi-circular arch. To the left of the morning room through sliding doors and behind the verandah is the living room, behind this again is the dining room again entered by sliding doors and opening onto a loggia. This flow of space from room to room was an innovation used often by Waterhouse in his designs.

Directly behind the Entrance Hall is situated the kitchen with a clever pass door and washroom under the stair landing to allow the maid to answer the front door. The rear of the house is occupied by service rooms and maid quarters.

Contents:

Still furnished and decorated exactly as it was when new with many items from David Jones and Beard Watsons, visitors can compare downstairs photos from 1914's The Sydney Mail with today. When soft furnishings wore out they were replaced with similar ones. The fuel stove and gas lights remain, despite electric lights, stove, and refrigerator.

There is a set of records - receipts for furniture and garden plants, personal items - postcards and souvenirs brought home for the children from an overseas trip.

=== Condition ===
As of 4 January 2001, the building is in excellent condition. While the garden has not been maintained to the same degree as the house, sufficient archaeological evidence exists on site to give a clear indication of the layout and plantings.

The house (and its contents) is highly intact. The garden has been compromised, but physical evidence of the original path system and driveway survives. The surviving physical and documentary evidence would provide information to allow the reinstatement of the original layout and plantings.

=== Modifications and dates ===
There have been very minor alterations to this site, comprising alterations to the garden, and changes to the rear entry of the property. Other than these alterations, the house is in near original condition, including the interior.

1916 Garage is built adjoining the house.

Other alterations and additions throughout its history:

- Metal garden shed
- Later galvanised steel balustrade on western elevation, and associated gutter
- Later brick garden wall
- Later timber boundary fence to north, east and west boundaries.
- Pipe handrail adjacent to ramped entry adjacent to the back door
- Front and back door lights
- Tiling to rear (north) porch
- Later bathroom fitout including installation of modern cistern to lavatory
- Surface mounted services and power outlets
- Contemporary floor finishes to wet areas
- Later shelving in pantry and store.
- 1914 2 almost symmetrical lily pilly trees on either side of the main gate were planted.
- 1940s The garden contains a number of mature trees, particularly on the southern boundary. Many of the Australian species are believed to have been planted by Dr William (Bill) Donaldson in the 1940s - he was the plant enthusiast of the family.
- 1998 Roof repairs and maintenance carried out by A. Stanley.

== Heritage listing ==
As at 19 January 2005, Tulkiyan is of state significance as an important, intact example of a fine Arts & Crafts suburban villa, designed by eminent Edwardian architect B.J. Waterhouse of the architectural firm of Waterhouse and Lake, for a prominent local family. The design of the house, together with their contents, represent the taste and lifestyle of the upper middle class in Sydney prior to World War 1, and document the building's ownership and occupation by the Donaldson Family for 80 years with a minimum of alteration from the original 1913 house. The ownership has remained in the one family from the commissioning of the architect to its bequest to Ku-ring-gai Council by Miss Margaret Donaldson in 1985. The largely intact interior is furnished with most of the original contents of the house. There is comprehensive documentary evidence relating to the house, family, contents and garden. The house and its garden setting also represent the suburban expansion of Gordon during the early twentieth century.

Tulkiyan was listed on the New South Wales State Heritage Register on 27 May 2005 having satisfied the following criteria.

The place is important in demonstrating the course, or pattern, of cultural or natural history in New South Wales.

Tulkiyan is of state and local significance as the house and its contents form a unique representative collection that demonstrate the lifestyle and taste of the upper middle class in suburban Sydney during the early decades of the twentieth century.

Tulkiyan is of local significance as the house represents the early phase of residential subdivision in the suburb of Gordon early in the twentieth century. It is associated with the Donaldson family, in particular Mrs Margaret Donaldson, née Scott, and her children.

The place has a strong or special association with a person, or group of persons, of importance of cultural or natural history of New South Wales's history.

Tulkiyan is of state and local significance for its ability to demonstrate through physical and documentary evidence the eighty year ownership and occupation of the Donaldson family, who originally commissioned Tulkiyan.

Tulkiyan is of state significance as an important and intact example of the work of the eminent architect Bertrand James Waterhouse, OBE, FRIBA, LFRAIA (1876 - 1965). Waterhouse is regarded as the most significant domestic architect to emerge in NSW in the decade immediately before the First World War.

The highly successful Architectural Practice formed by B. J. Waterhouse and J. W. Hamilton Lake in 1908 was responsible for the design of numerous stately homes, cottages, churches, cinemas and public buildings, including "Brent Knowle" (1913) at Neutral Bay, "Nutcote" (1925) at Neutral Bay and "Elwatan" (1926) at Castle Hill.

Waterhouse was deeply committed to and a great proponent of the Arts and Crafts movement, however his later work embraced a number of architectural styles. The domestic architecture of Waterhouse was widely featured and documented in the publications: Australian Home Beautiful; The Salon; Architecture; Houses and Gardens; and The Home.

A measure of Waterhouse's influence and reputation is demonstrated by his prominent appointments and awards. At various times he was President of the Royal Australian Institute of Architects, President of the NSW Board of Architects, Chairman of the National Planning and Development Committee, Canberra, President of the Board of Trustees of the Art gallery of NSW, and in 1949 he was awarded the Gold Medal by the Royal Australian Institute of Architects.

Tulkiyan is of local significance for its association with the Donaldson family, in particular Mrs Mary Donaldson née Scott and her children, Mary, William and Margaret. Margaret Donaldson (1903 - 1994) who bequeathed the house and its contents to the community resided in the house for eighty years.

The place is important in demonstrating aesthetic characteristics and/or a high degree of creative or technical achievement in New South Wales.

Tulkiyan is of state and local significance as an example of the domestic work of the architect Bertrand James Waterhouse from the early years of the architectural practice of Waterhouse and Lake. It is an example of Arts and Crafts period design, characterized by its arrangement of forms and use of materials and detailing.

The house and its contents form a unique representative collection of the middle class preoccupation with the later manifestations of the English Arts and Crafts movement.

The house and its garden setting is a well known landmark on the Pacific Highway within the Gordon area.

The place has a strong or special association with a particular community or cultural group in New South Wales for social, cultural or spiritual reasons.

Tulkiyan is of local heritage significance to the community of Ku-ring-gai and the Ku-ring-gai Historical Society for its ability to reflect the tastes, values and ways of life of a single upper-middle-class family between 1913 - 1993. It is of social value for its place in the affections of the local community and those who knew Miss Margaret Donaldson. It is also important as a property gifted to the community by Miss Donaldson, an active member of the Ku-ring-gai community and Ku-ring-gai Historical Society.

The place has potential to yield information that will contribute to an understanding of the cultural or natural history of New South Wales.

Tulkiyan is of state and local significance as its contents provide an excellent source of information on the lifestyle and taste of an upper-middle-class family in suburban Sydney between the First and Second World Wars. The house is a rare and intact work of B. J. Waterhouse and survives with its full documentation, including documentary evidence of the interior decorations and furnishings, thus allowing considerable research and education opportunities into the methods of design, construction, as well as the lifestyle of the occupants.

The place possesses uncommon, rare or endangered aspects of the cultural or natural history of New South Wales.

Tulkiyan is of state and local significance as its setting and contents combine to form a rare example of an intact Arts and Crafts style residence, reflecting the tastes and lifestyle of an upper-middle-class family during the inter-war period in Sydney.

The architectural style and materials of the house, its well known architect, the common use provenance of the furniture, chattels and documents, and the original and uninterrupted occupation and use by a single family make Tulkiyan unique.

The place is important in demonstrating the principal characteristics of a class of cultural or natural places/environments in New South Wales.

Tulkiyan is of state and local significance as an example of the early domestic work of J. B. Waterhouse designed in the Arts and Crafts style. Its contents demonstrate the lifestyle and tastes of the upper middle class in suburban Sydney during the early decades of the twentieth century.
