= Clydebank (disambiguation) =

Clydebank refers to the banks of the River Clyde. It may also refer to:

== In Scotland ==
- Clydebank, the town in Scotland
  - Clydebank F.C., the town's football club
- Clydebank (district), the local government district centred on the town
- Clydebank and Milngavie (Scottish Parliament constituency), the Scottish Parliament constituency centred on the town
- Clydebank and Milngavie (UK Parliament constituency), the UK Parliament constituency centred on the town

== In Australia ==
- Clydebank, Millers Point, a heritage-listed house in Sydney, New South Wales
- Clydebank, a former mansion, now part of the Ave Maria College, in Aberfeldie, Melbourne, Victoria
