= 62–64 Argyle Place, Millers Point =

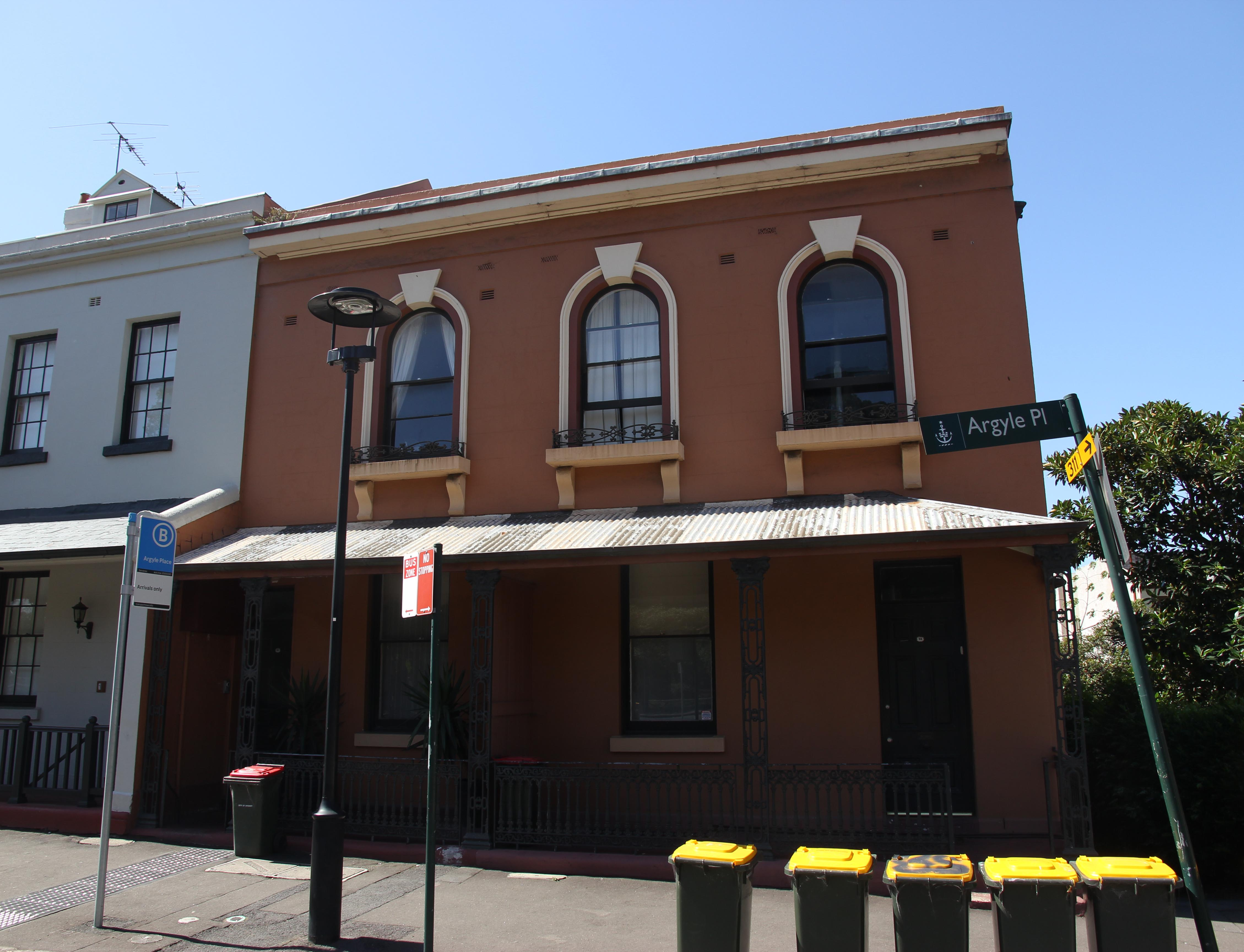
- 62–64 Argyle Place, pictured in 2019.

- Location within Sydney Location within Australia
- 33.8581°S 151.2053°E
- Location: 62, 64 Argyle Place, Millers Point, City of Sydney, New South Wales, Australia

History
- Built: c. 1864

Site notes
- Architectural style: Victorian Italianate

New South Wales Heritage Register
- Official name: Terrace
- Type: State heritage (built)
- Designated: 2 April 1999
- Reference no.: 895
- Type: Terrace
- Category: Residential buildings (private)

62–64 Argyle Place, Millers Point is a heritage-listed row of two terrace houses located at 62–64 Argyle Place, in the inner city Sydney suburb of Millers Point in the City of Sydney local government area of New South Wales, Australia. The property was added to the New South Wales State Heritage Register on 2 April 1999.

== History ==
One part of a terrace pair built c. 1864 and in fairly intact exterior condition, presenting a significant facade to Argyle Place. A central park and a dominant church give Argyle Place the appearance of a typical London Square. Work on Argyle Place was commenced by Governor Macquarie however, this area was not fully formed until after cessation of quarrying at nearby rockface. First tenanted by the NSW Department of Housing in 1982.

== Description ==
Two storey mid-Victorian terrace constructed c. 1864, decorative window surrounds to top floor. Cast iron lace and posts. Two bedrooms plus sleep-out. Storeys: Two; Construction: Paint finished rendered masonry with decorative window box ledges, and key stones above arched first floor windows. Corrugated galvanised iron roof, cast iron lace columns and ground floor balustrading. Style: Victorian Italianate.

The external condition of the property is good.

=== Modifications and dates ===
External: One cast iron column missing. Beaded timber end verandah wall has been removed. Last inspected: 19 February 1995.

== Heritage listing ==
As at 23 November 2000, this is a fine mid-Victorian terrace house, one of an unequal width in mostly original external condition. Building forms part of a significant streetscape element facing Argyle Place.

It is part of the Millers Point Conservation Area, an intact residential and maritime precinct. It contains residential buildings and civic spaces dating from the 1830s and is an important example of C19th adaptation of the landscape.

62–64 Argyle Place was listed on the New South Wales State Heritage Register on 2 April 1999.

== See also ==
- Australian residential architectural styles
- Undercliffe Terrace
- Garrison Church, Sydney
