= B. J. Waterhouse =

English-born Australian architect and artist

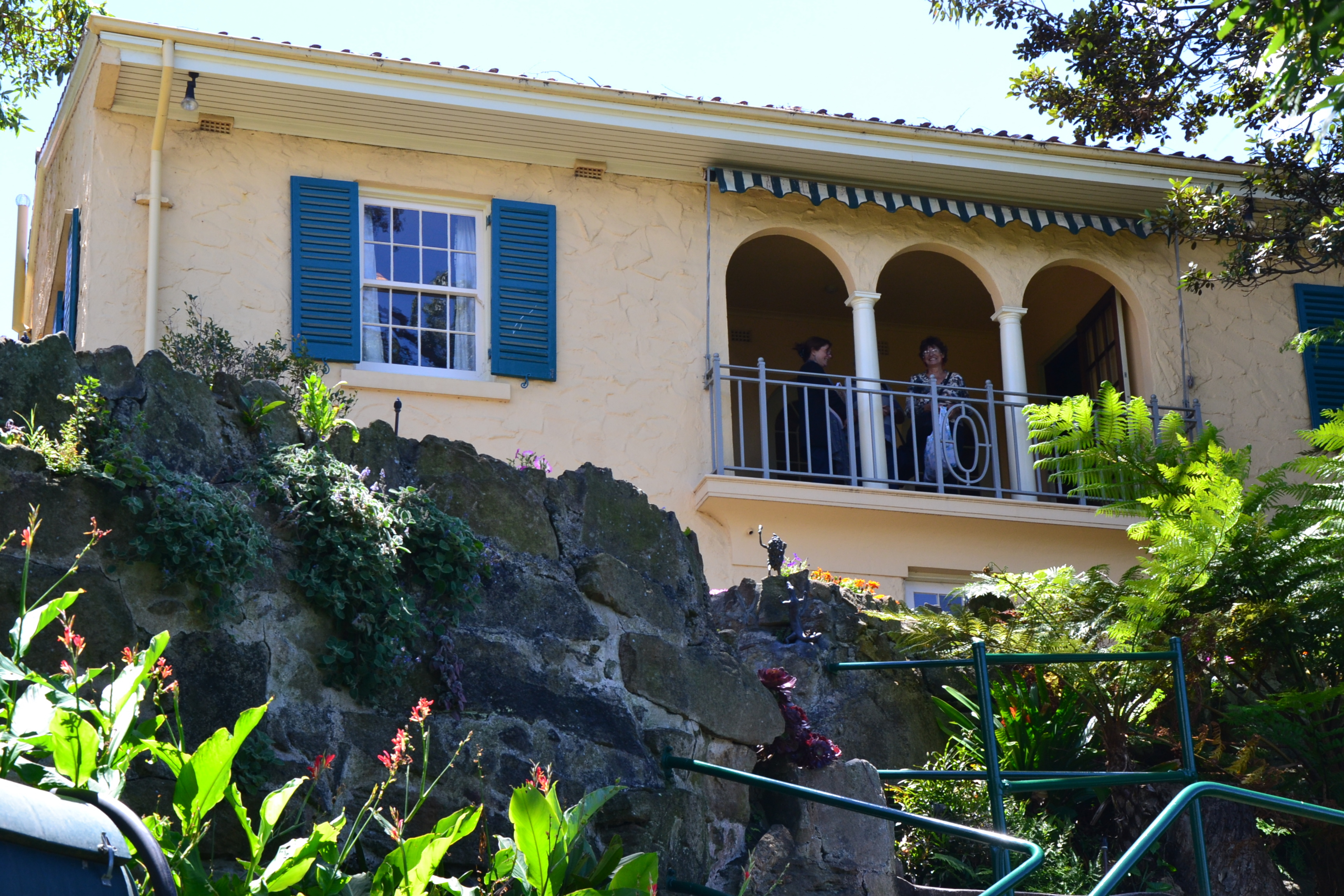
- Nutcote
- Born: 8 February 1876; Leeds, England
- Died: 21 December 1965 (aged 89); Neutral Bay, Sydney, Australia
- Occupation: Architect
- Practice: Waterhouse and Lake
- Buildings: Listed under the NSW Heritage Act; Nutcote, 5 Wallaringa Avenue, Kurraba Point; Tulkiyan, 707 Pacific Highway, Gordon

Bertrand James Waterhouse OBE, FRAIA, FRIBA (8 February 1876 – 2 December 1965) was an English-born Australian architect and artist.

== Early life ==
B. J. Waterhouse, as he was commonly known, was born in Leeds, Yorkshire, England, and was the son of James Waterhouse, a grocer, and his wife Sarah, née Turner. Waterhouse reached Sydney from the Gulf of Mexico with his mother and two sisters in March 1885 and was educated in Burwood. He studied architecture at Sydney Technical College while articled to John Spencer and on 6 July 1898 married 19-year-old Lilian Woodcock (d.1955) at Christ Church St Laurence. Joining the professional relieving staff of the Department of Public Works in NSW in March 1900, he worked in the Harbours and Rivers branch and became a relieving architectural draftsman.

== Architect ==
He was in partnership with John Hamilton William Lake Lake from 1908. Waterhouse built up a substantial practice, particularly in the Cremorne-Neutral Bay area. Until the mid-1920s his domestic architecture drew on the Arts and Crafts Movement, with steeply gabled roofs, extensive use of sandstone in the basements, shingle tiles and roughcast exterior wall surfaces. Thereafter his style showed a strong Mediterranean influence, a notable example being May Gibbs's house, Nutcote, with textured stucco walls and symmetrical, twelve-paned, shuttered windows. Waterhouse had a gift for composing shapes, textures, solids and voids into seemingly casual, informal architecture; he was particularly aware of the needs to build in scale and sympathy with people. Thus his houses have a comfortable and warm character, without fuss or strain, free of unnecessary detail. Waterhouse in his early architecture followed the precepts of the English Arts and Crafts movement and his work has a close affinity to that of Charles Voysey, Baillie Scott and Charles Rennie Mackintosh. A typical Waterhouse residence featured asymmetrical, picturesque massing, strongly expressed roofs, usually with dominant gables; porches, balconies and verandahs; and at least one facetted oriel or bay external wall finish, together with areas of timber shingling or tile-hanging. Inside, the main rooms displayed timber wainscoting on the walls and heavy timber beams below the ceilings. He continued to design in this manner until the early 1920s. In his later years Waterhouse designed residences in the Spanish Mission Style.

== Artist ==
An excellent pencil draughtsman, Waterhouse exhibited drawings at annual exhibitions of the (Royal) Art Society of New South Wales from 1902. He travelled through Europe in 1926 with Lionel Lindsay and Will Ashton, and in 1932 exhibited his drawings at the Macquarie Galleries, Sydney. A trustee of the National Art Gallery of New South Wales from 1922, Waterhouse was president in 1939–58; he was also State president of the Society of Arts and Crafts. Twenty one pencil drawings by B. J. Waterhouse are held in the collection at the Art Gallery of New South Wales.

== Employment ==
- New South Wales Government Architect's Office (1900–08)
- Waterhouse and Lake (1908–1924)
- Worked in association with Leslie Wilkinson
- Director, and later chairman, National Capital Planning and Development Committee (1938–58)

== Notable works ==
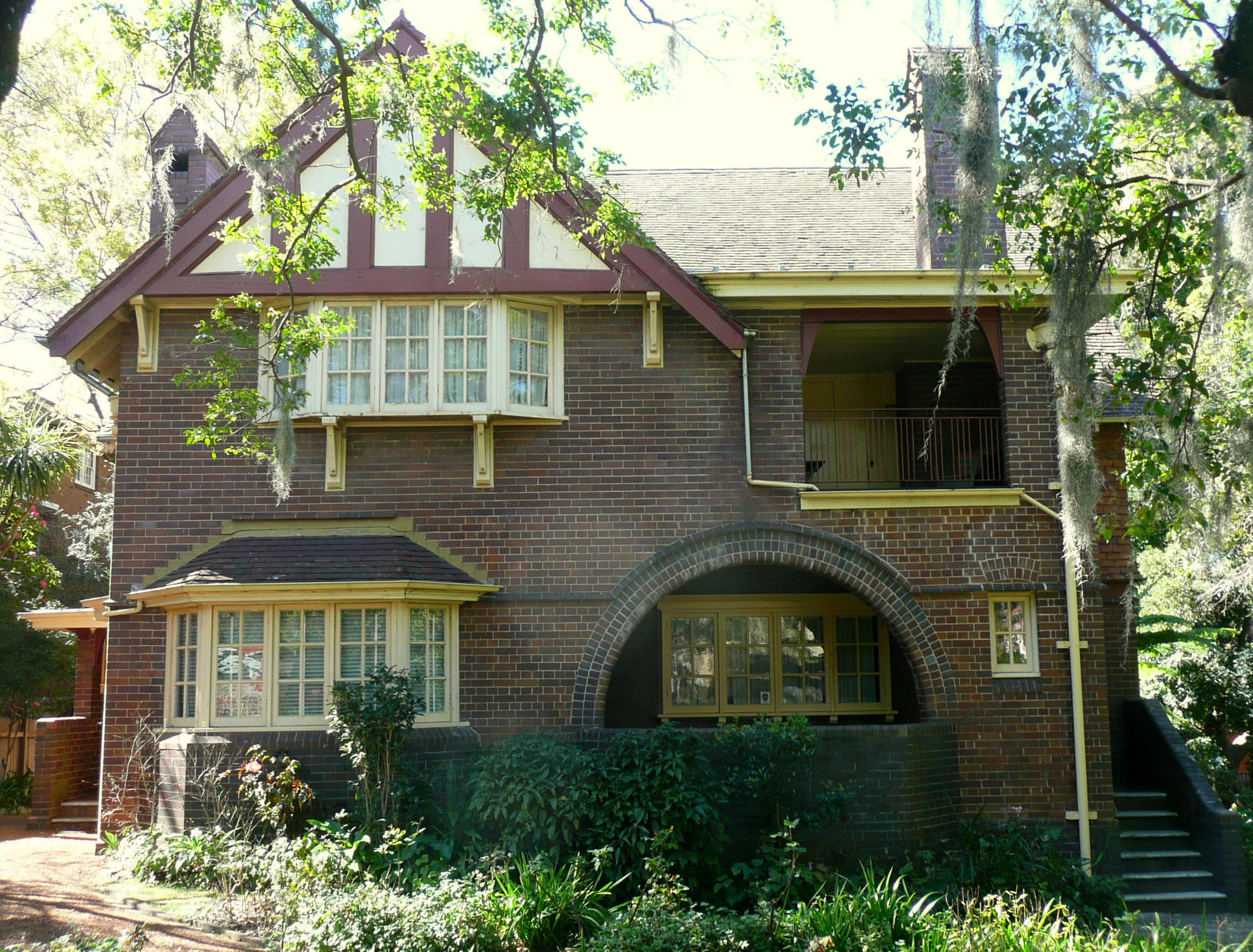
Tulkiyan, Gordon

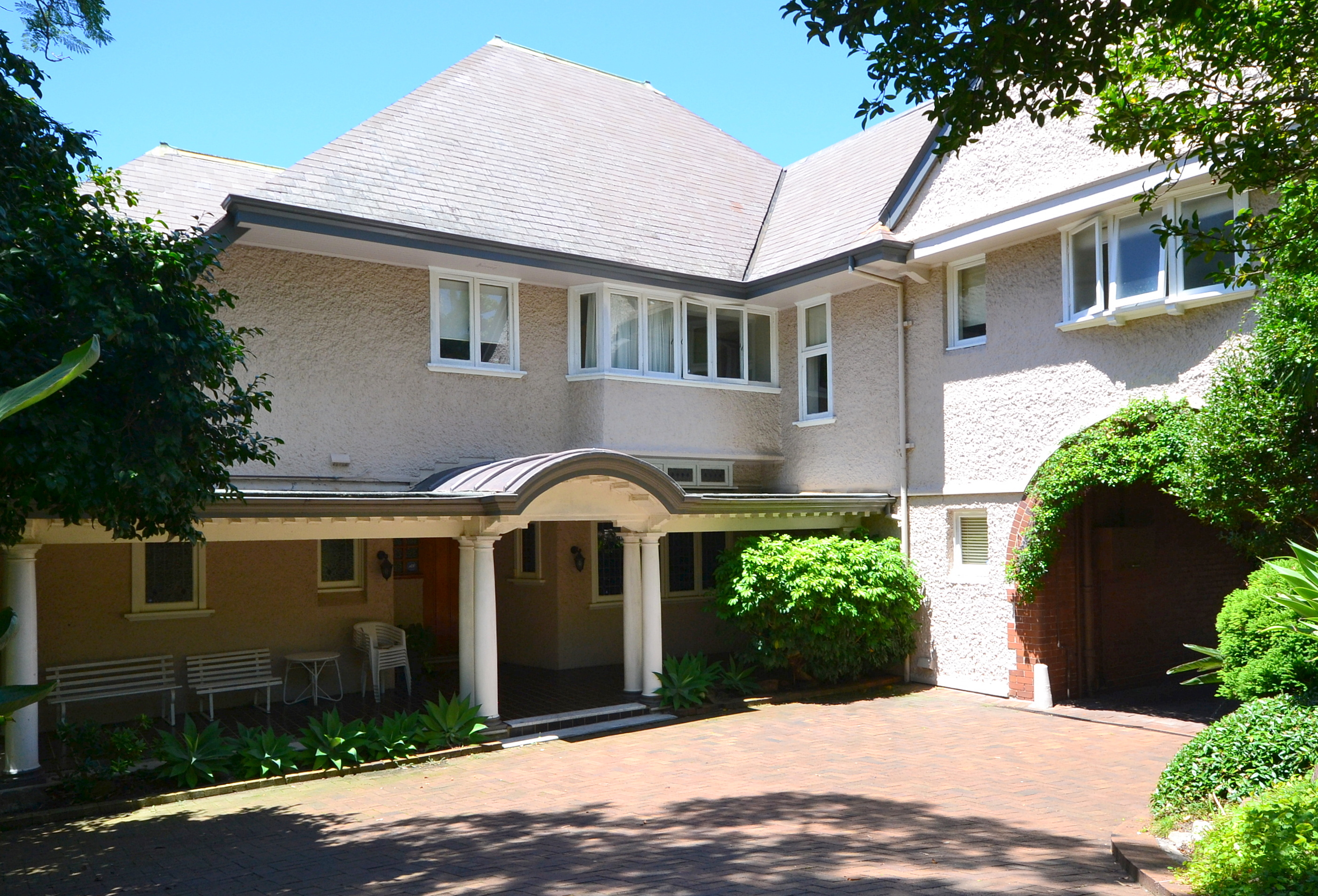
Brent Knowle, Neutral Bay

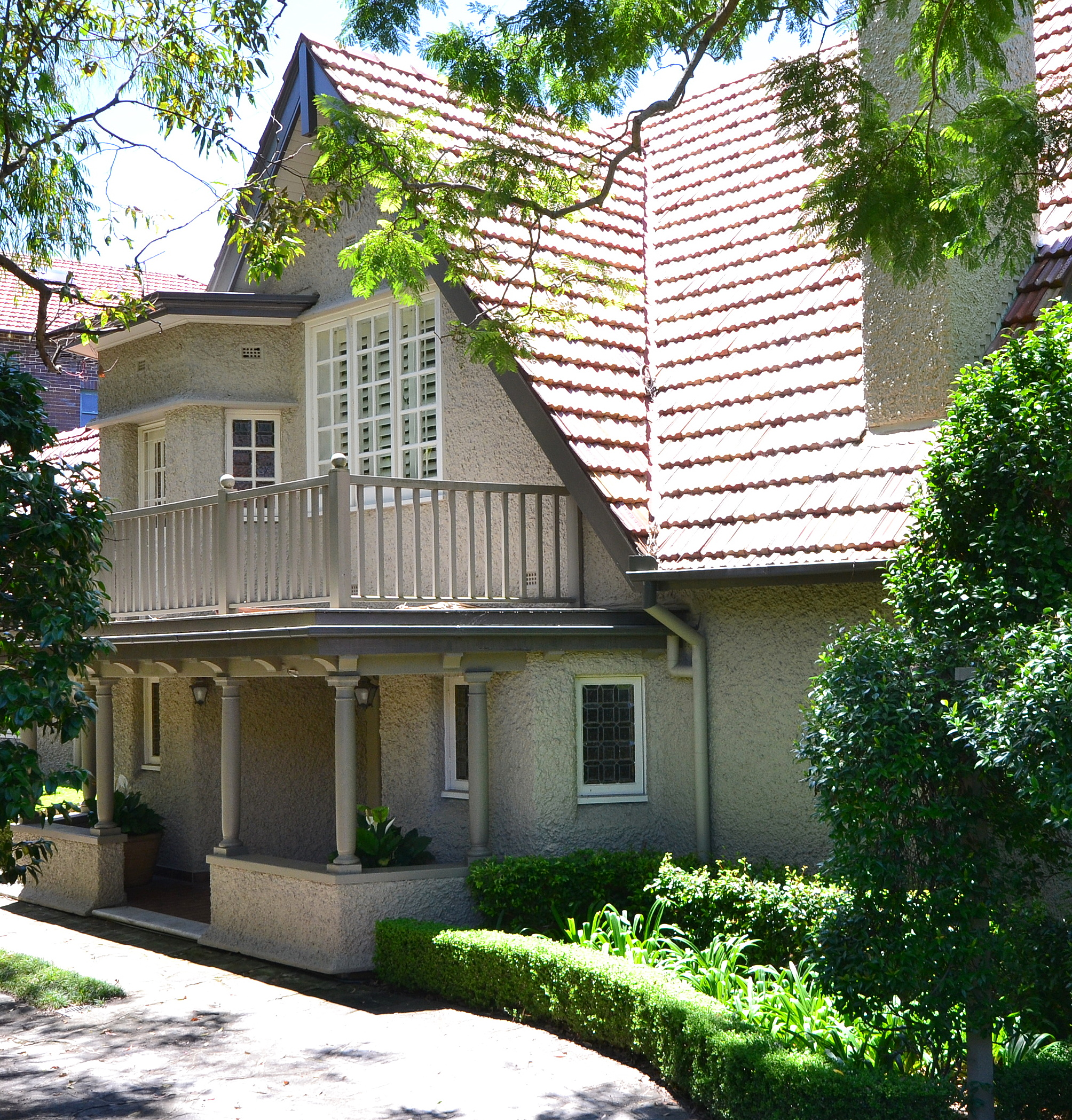
Ailsa, Neutral Bay

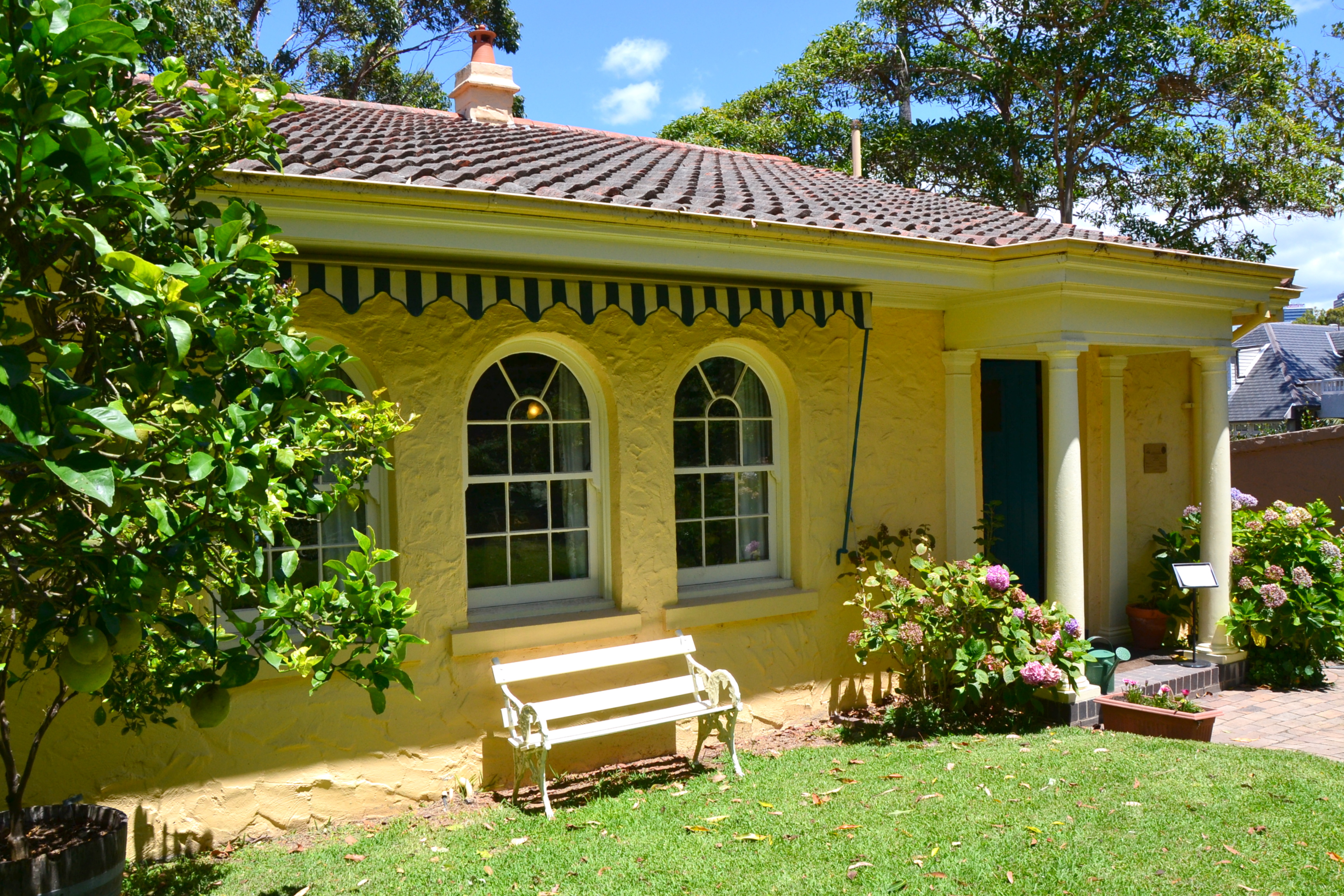
Nutcote, Neutral Bay

- Ailsa, 33 Shellcove Road, Neutral Bay (1908)
- Holme Building – University of Sydney (The), Science Road, University of Sydney (1910–1912)
- St Anne's, 37 Shellcove Road, Neutral Bay (1912)
- Rowerdennan House, built for Beresford Grant in Warrawee Avenue, Warrawee. (1913)
- Tulkiyan, 707 Pacific Highway, Gordon (1913)
- Brent Knowle, 31 Shellcove Road, Neutral Bay (1914)
- St. Ange/St. Agnes, 13 Shellcove Road, Neutral Bay (1917)
- The Gables, 16 Spruson Street Cremorne (1920)
- Somerset, The Boulevarde Strathfield (1923) now part of Trinity Grammar School Preparatory School
- Silvermere and the Chauffeur's Cottage, 38 Blaxland Road, Wentworth Falls (1923)
- Refectory Building, Science Road, University of Sydney (1924)
- Nutcote, May Gibbs's House, 5 Wallaringa Avenue Kurraba Point (previously classified as Neutral Bay) (1925)

== Listed buildings ==
(Either designed by B J Waterhouse himself, or by Waterhouse & Lake Partnership, or as Government Architect)

- Bundabulla, 10 Guthrie Avenue, Cremorne, North Sydney,
- Bundarra – House and Grounds, 7 Bundarra Road, Bellevue Hill, Woollahra,
- House, 64 Dalton Road, Mosman
- House, 35 (now 33A) Bangalla Street, Warrawee, Ku-ring-gai,
- House, 6 Claude Avenue, Cremorne, North Sydney
- House, 8 Claude Avenue, Cremorne, North Sydney
- House, 14 Cremorne Road, Cremorne, North Sydney
- House, 35 Milson Road, Cremorne, North Sydney
- House 13 Shellcove Road, Neutral Bay, North Sydney
- House 29 Bogota Avenue, Cremorne, North Sydney
- Kew Place, House, 10 Buena Vista Avenue, Mosman
- Manning Building – University of Sydney (The), Manning Road, University of Sydney (The), Sydney
- Mowll Memorial Village: Lober House, 284 Castle Hill Road, Castle Hill, Hornsby
- Mowll Memorial Village: Tower House, 284 Castle Hill Road, Castle Hill, Hornsby
- Murong – House and Grounds, 633 New South Head Road, Rose Bay, Woollahra
- Pair of houses, Airlie (No. 12), 12 and 14 Buena Vista Avenue, Mosman
- Shellcove Road Group, Neutral Bay, No>rth Sydney
- St. Claire – House, 25–27 Cranbrook Road, Bellevue Hill, Woollahra
- House, 43 Robertson Road, Centennial Park, Sydney
- Werribree – House, Gardens, Retaining Walls, Fences, Covered Gateways, Trees: 37 New South Head Road, Vaucluse, Woollahra
- Yeomerry – Building, 1 St. Marks Road (188 New South Head Road), Darling Point, Woollahra

== See also ==
- Australian architectural styles
- New South Wales Government Architect
- Arts and Crafts Movement

Government offices
Preceded by John Lane Mullins	President of the Board of Trustees of the Art Gallery of New South Wales; 1939–1958	Succeeded by William Herbert Ifould
