= 40–44 Argyle Place, Millers Point =

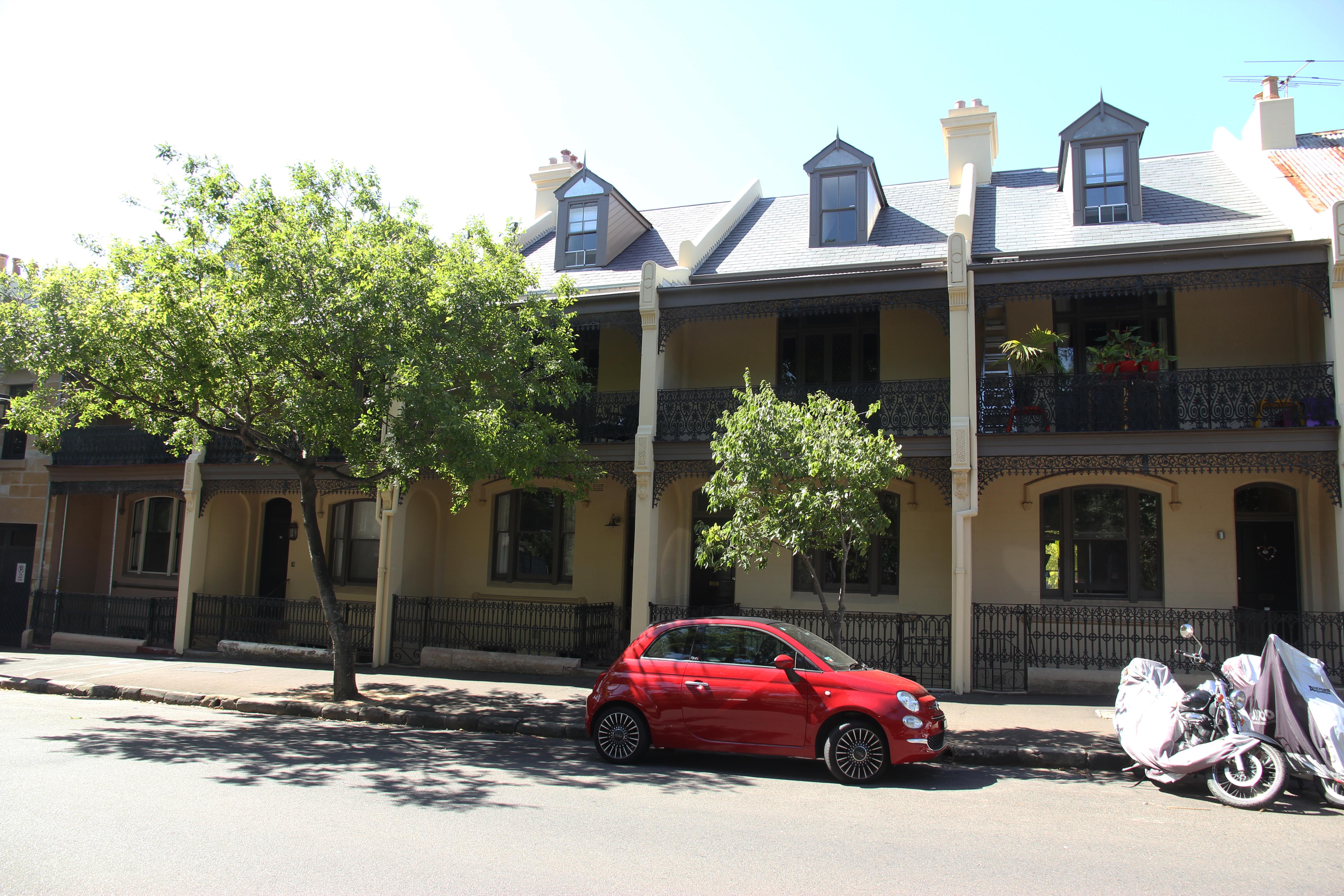
- 40–44 Argyle Place, pictured at right in 2019.

- Location within Sydney Location within Australia
- 33.8580°S 151.2047°E
- Location: 40, 42, 44 Argyle Place, Millers Point, City of Sydney, New South Wales, Australia

History
- Built: c. 1890

Site notes
- Architectural style: Victorian Italianate

New South Wales Heritage Register
- Official name: Terraces
- Type: State heritage (built)
- Designated: 2 April 1999
- Reference no.: 926
- Type: Historic site

40–44 Argyle Place, Millers Point is a row of heritage-listed terrace houses located at 40–44 Argyle Place, in the inner city Sydney suburb of Millers Point, within the City of Sydney local government area of New South Wales, Australia. The property was included in the New South Wales State Heritage Register on 2 April 1999.

== History ==
Millers Point is one of the earliest areas of European settlement in Australia, and a focus for maritime activities. Argyle Place, a primitive version of a London Square, was commenced by Governor Macquarie but not fully formed until after quarrying of the adjacent rock face had ceased in about 1865. The 1900 Resumption Plan indicates this terrace was owned by James Lawler at that time. First tenanted by NSW Department of Housing in 1982.

== Description ==
This Victorian Italianate terrace has two units, one one-bedroom and two two-bedrooms. It has a corrugated iron roof over a first floor verandah. This two storey building has an asymmetrical facade; it has a set of three windows in an arch at ground floor with decorative mouldings surrounding and a stone sill under; cast iron balustrades, gates and frieze along verandahs. The first floor has a french door to verandah with side lights and transom lights above. An entrance to the basement is arranged by a narrow stair from the front verandah. Storeys: Three; Construction: Painted stuccoed masonry walls, corrugated galvanised iron roof. Decorative cast iron friezes and balustrades. Painted timber joinery. Style: Victorian Italianate. Orientation: Overlooking Argyle Place.

The external condition of the property is good.

=== Modifications and dates ===
External: Dormer windows at front added c. 1910. Last inspected: 19 February 1995.

=== Further information ===
Part of a row of terraces built c. 1890.

== Heritage listing ==
As at 23 November 2000, these c. 1890 terraces are an important streetscape element facing Argyle Place.

It is part of the Millers Point Conservation Area, an intact residential and maritime precinct. It contains residential buildings and civic spaces dating from the 1830s and is an important example of 19th century adaptation of the landscape.

40–44 Argyle Place, Millers Point was listed on the New South Wales State Heritage Register on 2 April 1999.

== See also ==
- Australian residential architectural styles
- 36–38 Argyle Place
- 46–48 Argyle Place
