= Osborne House, Millers Point =

Osborne House
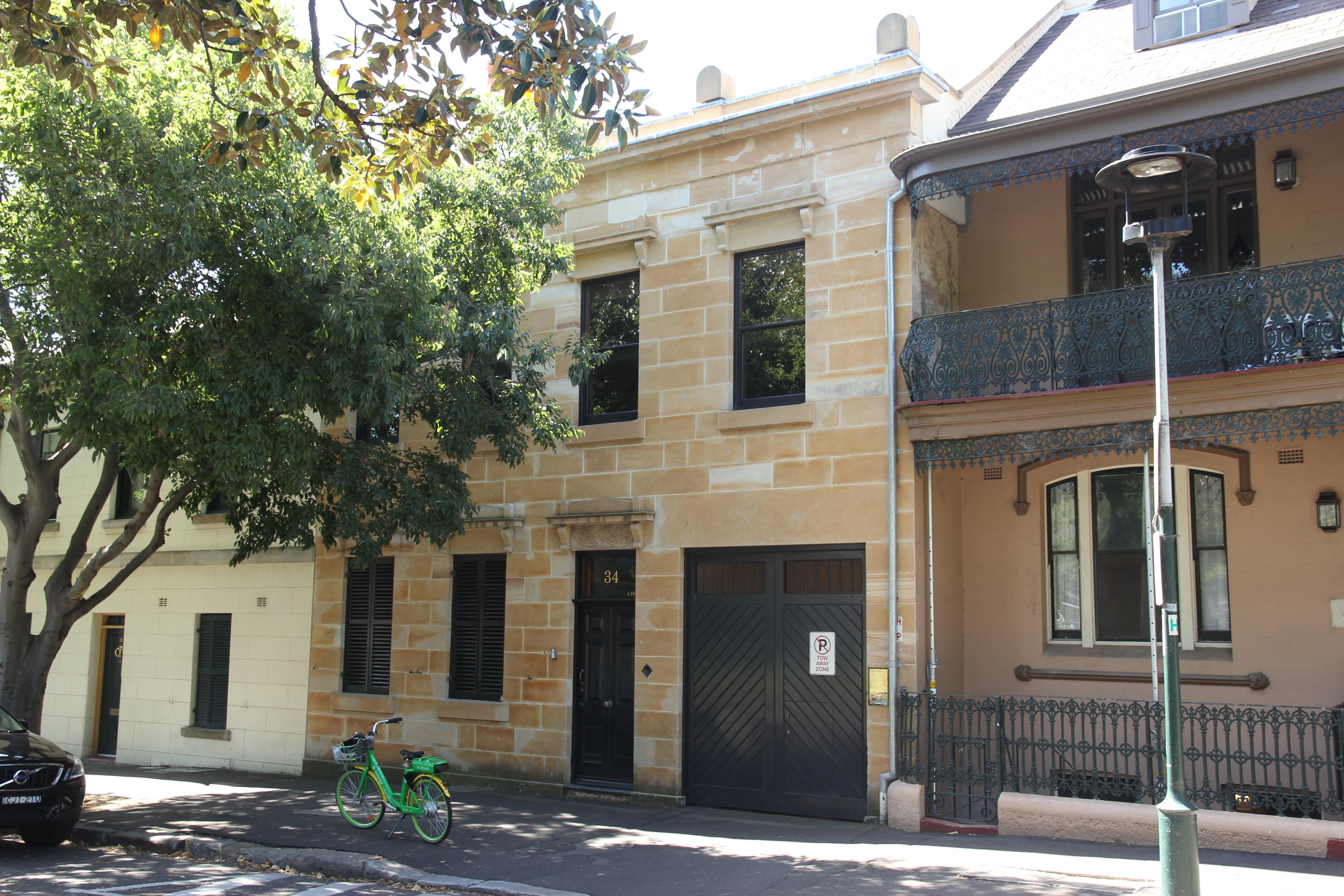
- Osborne House, 34 Argyle Place, Millers Point, pictured in 2019.

- Location within Sydney Location within Australia
- 33.8581°S 151.2042°E
- Location: 34 Argyle Place, Millers Point, City of Sydney, New South Wales, Australia

History
- Built: c. 1835

Site notes
- Architectural style: Old Colonial Regency

New South Wales Heritage Register
- Official name: Osborne House
- Type: State heritage (built)
- Designated: 2 April 1999
- Reference no.: 886
- Type: historic site

Osborne House is a heritage-listed former residence and now commercial building located at 34 Argyle Place, in the inner city Sydney suburb of Millers Point in the City of Sydney local government area of New South Wales, Australia. The property was added to the New South Wales State Heritage Register on 2 April 1999.

== History ==
Millers Point is one of the earliest areas of European settlement in Australia, and a focus for maritime activities. Argyle Place, a primitive version of a London Square, was commenced by Governor Macquarie but not fully formed until after quarrying of the adjacent rock face had ceased in about 1865. First tenanted by the NSW Department of Housing in 1982.

In December 2004 the house sold for A$1.875 million.

== Description ==
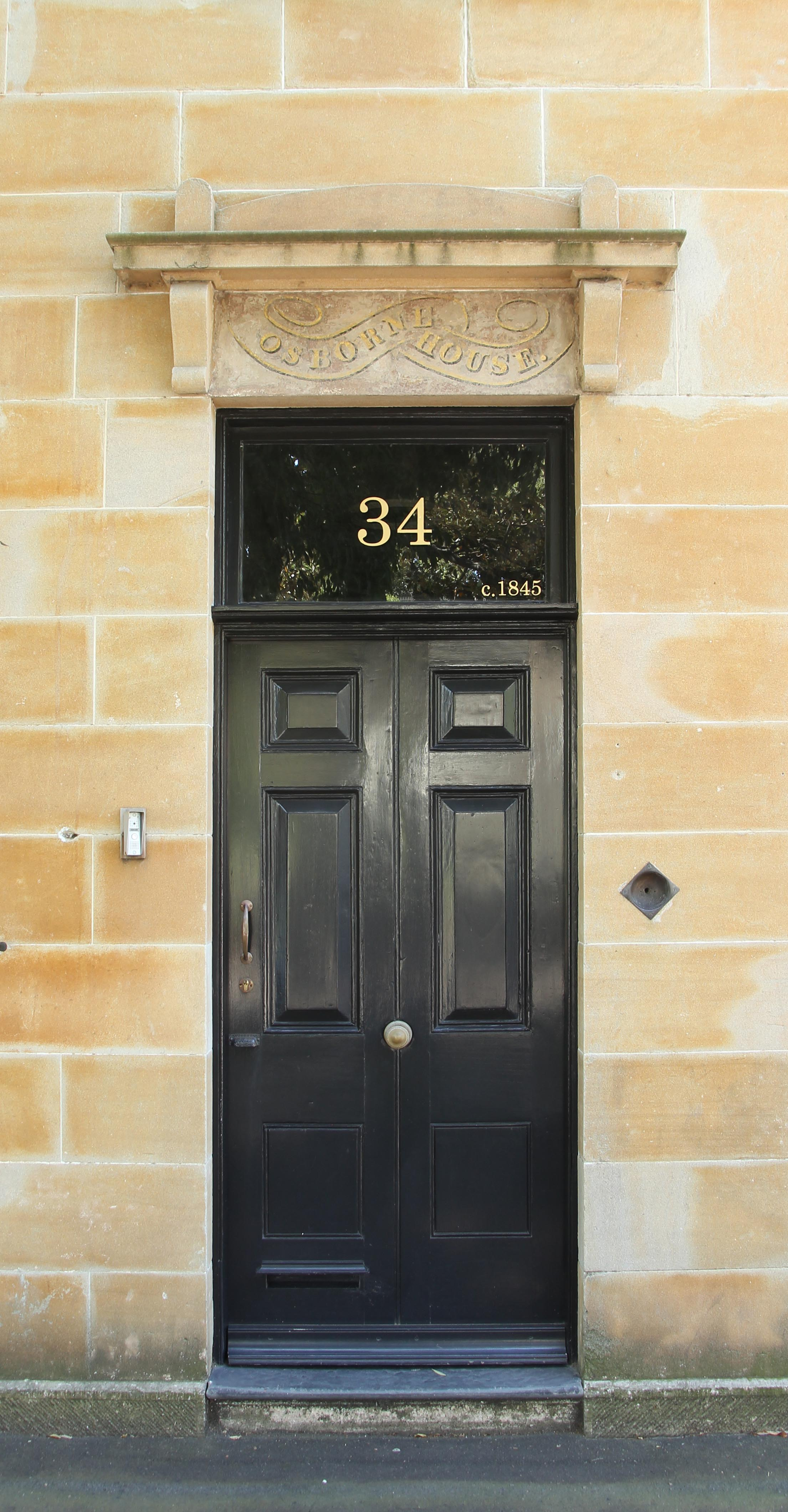
The portico of Osborne House, pictured in 2019.

Osborne House is an Old Colonial Regency style c. 1830 painted stuccoed stone townhouse with Greek revival detailing to door, window openings and parapet mouldings. Carriageway at eastern end leads to stone flagged courtyard. All windows and fanlight are late Victorian. Storeys: 2 Construction: Painted stucco on masonry walls, corrugated iron roofing, painted timber joinery. Greek revival facade detailing in paint finish. Style: Old Colonial Regency. Orientation: Overlooking Argyle Place.

The external condition of the property is good.

=== Modifications and dates ===
External: Evidence carriageway was originally arched. Last inspected: 19 February 1995.

== Heritage listing ==
As at 23 November 2000, this early 19th century Regency style brick townhouse is an important streetscape element facing Argyle Place.

It is part of the Millers Point Conservation Area, an intact residential and maritime precinct. It contains residential buildings and civic spaces dating from the 1830s and is an important example of 19th century adaptation of the landscape.

Osborne House was listed on the New South Wales State Heritage Register on 2 April 1999.

== See also ==
- Australian residential architectural styles
- 22–32 Argyle Place
- 36–38 Argyle Place
