= Undercliffe Cottage =

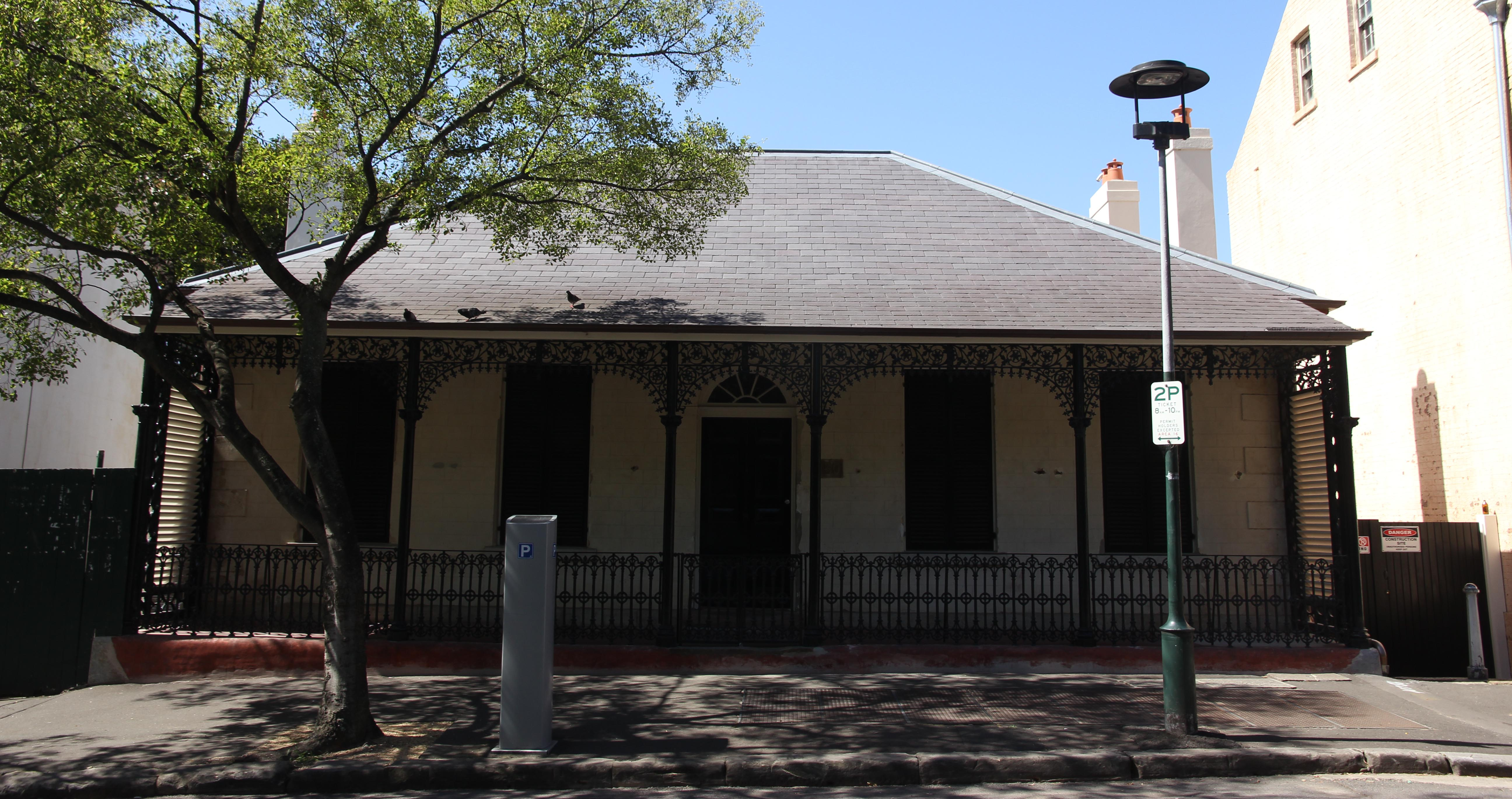
- Undercliffe Cottage, pictured in 2019

- Location within Sydney Location within Australia
- 33.8580°S 151.2048°E
- Location: 50 Argyle Place, Millers Point, City of Sydney, New South Wales, Australia

History
- Built: c. 1850s

Site notes
- Architectural style: Colonial Georgian

New South Wales Heritage Register
- Official name: Undercliffe Cottage (former); Undercliff Cottage; Grimes Cottage
- Type: State heritage (built)
- Designated: 2 April 1999
- Reference no.: 929
- Type: Cottage
- Category: Residential buildings (private)

Undercliffe Cottage is a heritage-listed residence located at 50 Argyle Place, in the inner city Sydney suburb of Millers Point in the City of Sydney local government area of New South Wales, Australia. It is also known as Undercliff Cottage; and Grimes Cottage. The property was added to the New South Wales State Heritage Register on 2 April 1999.

== History ==
Millers Point is one of the earliest areas of European settlement in Australia, and a focus for maritime activities. Argyle Place, a primitive version of a London Square, was commenced by Governor Macquarie but not fully formed until after quarrying of the adjacent rock face had ceased in about 1865. The first owner of the cottage was mariner Captain George Grimes (1801-1854). Resumption plans of 1900 show the house as part of James Merriman's estate.

In 1958 architect John Fisher (member of the Institute of Architects, the Cumberland County Council Historic Buildings Committee and on the first Council of the National Trust of Australia (NSW) after its reformation in 1960), with the help of artist Cedric Flower, convinced Taubmans to paint the central bungalow at 50 Argyle Place. This drew attention to the importance of the Rocks for the first time. As a result, Fisher was able to negotiate leases for Bligh House (later Clydebank) and houses in Windmill Street for various medical societies.

It was first tenanted by the NSW Department of Housing in 1982. The house was sold by the Government of New South Wales in 2015 for A$4.23 million.

== Description ==
Colonial Georgian style, four bedroom cottage with hipped slate roof continuous over verandah, and stuccoed walls. It is in good condition. This two storey (plus attic) building displays a symmetrical facade; it has large windows with stone sills at entry level (upper floor to street); cast iron balustrade, gate, columns and valance; and, an arched fan light above the front doorway. Storeys: 2 Construction: Stuccoed masonry walls, slate roof, rendered masonry chimney, cast iron verandah posts, frieze and balustrading. Painted timber joinery. Style: Late Georgian Orientation: Overlooking Argyle Place.

The external condition of the property is good.

=== Modifications and dates ===
External: Watercolour (c. 1850s) of house shows paired columns to verandah at entrance. Northern verandahs added between 1885 and 1900. Dormer windows at rear present in late 1850s photo. - Last inspected: 19 February 1995.

== Heritage listing ==
As at 23 November 2000, this c. 1850 detached Georgian house, is an important streetscape element facing Argyle Place.

It is part of the Millers Point Conservation Area, an intact residential and maritime precinct. It contains residential buildings and civic spaces dating from the 1830s and is an important example of C19th adaptation of the landscape.

Undercliffe Cottage was listed on the New South Wales State Heritage Register on 2 April 1999.

== See also ==
- Australian residential architectural styles
- 46-48 Argyle Place
- Undercliffe Terrace, 52–60 Argyle Place
