= Samuel Lyons =

Convict transported to Australia

Samuel Lyons (c. 1791 – 3 August 1851) was a pardoned convict from London who rose to prominence in the Australian colony of New South Wales as a landowner and businessman. A tailor by trade, Lyons was sentenced to transportation for life in 1814 for theft. He reached Sydney in January 1815. He made an attempt to escape in April, but was brought back to Sydney in February 1816. In August 1816 he was taken to Hobart and in April 1817 he again unsuccessfully tried to escape. On 24 July 1819, for robbing government stores at Hobart, he was sentenced to receive 200 lashes and 4 years at Newcastle.

Lyons married Mary Murphy on 20 May 1822 according to the rites of the Roman Catholic Church. He returned to Sydney in 1823 and opened a small store in Pitt Street and received a conditional pardon in March 1825 and an absolute pardon in May 1832. In 1825 Lyons set up as an auctioneer. Within three years he was described as a man of integrity. In 1827 he was joined by his brother, Saul, who arrived as a free immigrant, and some time later by another brother, Abraham. His sister, Lydia Samuel, migrated to Sydney in 1832, with her young son Saul (1820–1900). Besides other business achievements, Saul Samuel would become the first Jew to become a magistrate, the first Jew elected to parliament, and the first Jew to become a minister of the Crown. Saul also received a knighthood.

Over the years, he was an industrious trader and auctioneer, eventually acquiring large tracts of land in the colony, and had many other business interests. Among these were three ships that made five whaling voyages for him between 1841 and 1847. Lyons purchased the Five Dock Farm estate from military surgeon and magistrate John Harris in 1836. He was soon to subdivide the land and sell it off in lots. It was at this time that he began the development of the first roads in the area, including Lyons Road, which bears his name.

Lyons was active in various public affairs, serving on various committees, and helping in 1835 to found the Australian Patriotic Association together with William Wentworth, William Bland and others, described as Australia's first political party. He joined them in petitions for trial by jury and taxation by representation, for the rejection of payment for public services not performed in the colony, for the wiser use of revenue from sales of waste land, and for the local government of Sydney. His conservative views and great wealth aroused antagonism, and in 1843 he was accused of undue political influence in the election of Wentworth and Bland to the New South Wales Legislative Council.

Lyons had two sons and a daughter with Mary: George Herbert (b.1823), Samuel (1826–1910) and Hannah. In the 1828 census Lyons had declared himself a Protestant but after his wife died in 1832 he rejoined the Jewish community and became a prominent member of the York Street Synagogue and of many Jewish committees. His three children were brought up in the Christian faith and were sent to be educated in England. He never remarried. By the time of his death in 1851, Lyons was a highly respected member of the establishment in New South Wales. He was buried in the Jewish portion of the Devonshire Street Cemetery, and following its closure, his tombstone was transferred to Botany cemetery in 1901. George became a barrister in England, while Samuel took over his father's enterprises, and in 1853 married Charlotte Margaret Futter at St James' Church, Sydney. They had three sons and a daughter. Samuel was twice elected to the New South Wales Legislative Assembly: in Canterbury (1859–60) and Central Cumberland (1868–69), and was associated with Henry Parkes, the "father of federation".
