= Penrhyn House =

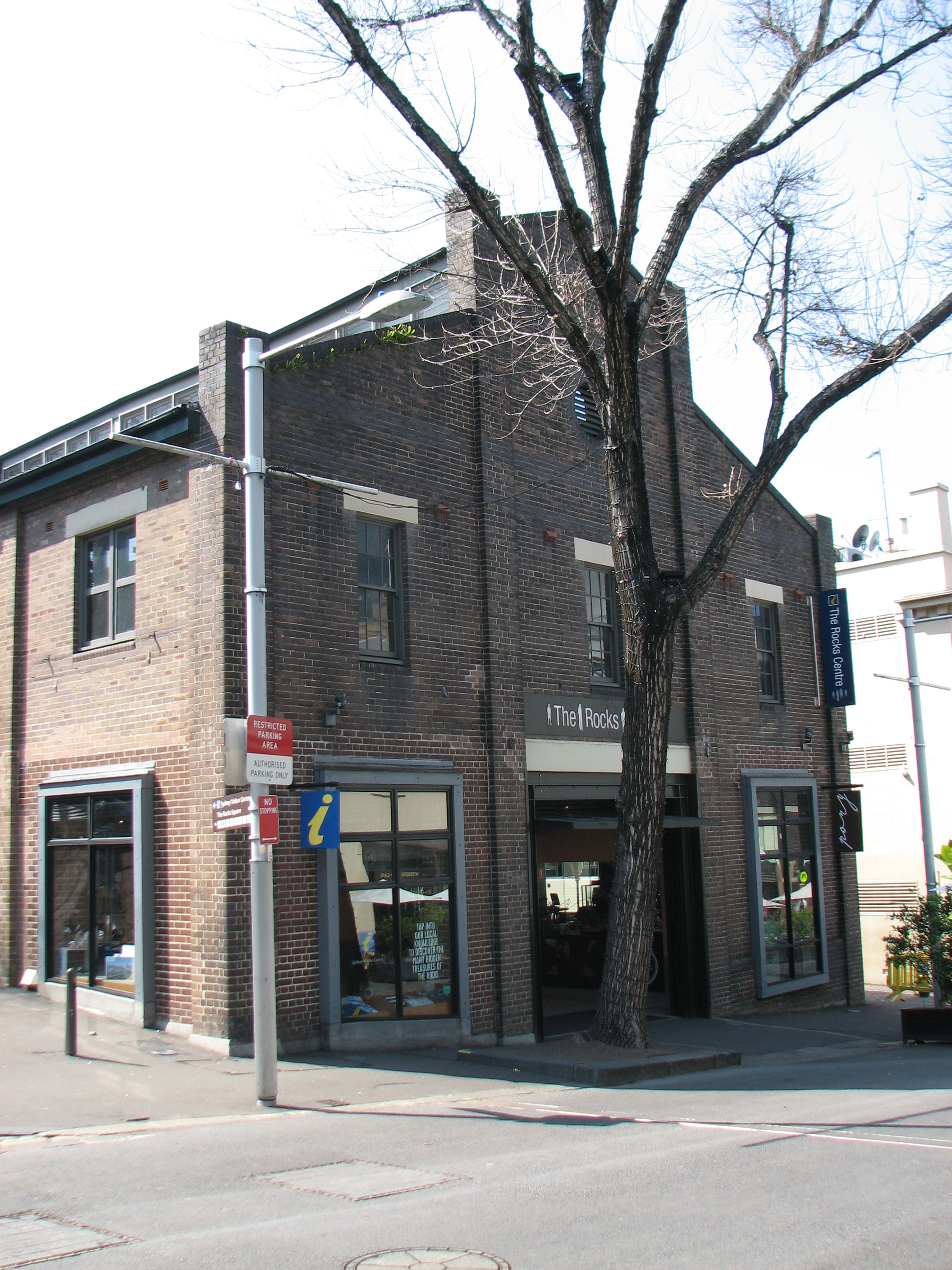

- Location within Sydney Location within Australia
- 33.8589°S 151.2084°E
- Location: 22–26 Playfair Street, The Rocks, City of Sydney, New South Wales, Australia

History
- Built: 1924
- Built for: John Turnbull Esq.

Site notes
- Owner: Property NSW

New South Wales Heritage Register
- Official name: Penrhyn House; The Rocks Centre; Playfair's Garage (Playfairs)
- Type: State heritage (built)
- Designated: 10 May 2002
- Reference no.: 1568
- Type: Factory/ Plant
- Category: Manufacturing and Processing

Penrhyn House is a heritage-listed former terrace houses, garage and factory and now retail stores located at 22–26 Playfair Street in the inner city Sydney suburb of The Rocks in the City of Sydney local government area of New South Wales, Australia. It was designed and built by John Turnbull Esq. during 1924. It is also known as The Rocks Centre and Playfair's Garage (Playfairs). The property is owned by Property NSW, an agency of the Government of New South Wales. It was added to the New South Wales State Heritage Register on 10 May 2002.

== History ==
The site of Playfair's Garage and Scarborough Houses was part of the first hospital site, although it does not appear to have been developed until the 1840s. In 1816 it was subdivided into three allotments. In 1841 all three allotments were acquired by Frederic Unwin, who subdivided the land with frontage to George Street and created Kendall Lane and New George Street (now Playfair). In 1842 Unwin was experiencing financial difficulties and the southern allotments, now the site of Playfair's Garage, were sold to James Chapman and William Perry. In 1844 Unwin erected three stone stores four storeys high at the northern end of the site. In 1852 Unwin was declared bankrupt, and sold his properties. The stores were acquired by William Nicholson, and in 1858 were leased to Berkelman & Bate who operated the building as a steam flour mill until c.1860. In 1861 it was acquired by Lawrence Kendall who converted the building into what has since been known as 'Kendall's Biscuit Factory'. Between 1871–75 the land fronting Argyle and Playfair Streets was developed by Henry Bell and William Billyard respectively. Bell constructed Argyle Terraces on the site of Playfair's Garage. Billyard constructed more on Playfair Street. Small sheds, blacksmiths' shops and outbuildings were built on the remnant of the site. In 1889 Kendall & Sons, biscuit manufacturers, are recorded as occupying No. 24, adjoining the factory. In 1900 the land was resumed under the Observatory Hill Act. By 1925 a two storey building had been erected on the site, described as a factory, and owned by John Turnbull. Between 1925–49 it continued to be listed as a factory or workshop. It was called 'Playfair's Garage'. In 1970 control of the land was vested in the Sydney Cove Redevelopment Authority and in 1978 the Authority began an extensive redevelopment project on the site. Turnbull's 1925 building was renamed Penrhyn House, but the name never caught on. The buildings north of Playfair's Garage were demolished. A new building was erected in 1978–79, named "Scarborough House". In 2005 the building was completely refurbished and The Rocks Visitor Centre moved into the top floor.

== Description ==
Built c. 1924 as ground floor of factory for John Turnbull Esq. The building was two storey, with brick walls and clerestory iron roof. It originally had offices at Argyle Street end, lavatories at each end, and vehicular access from Kendall Lane. Alterations were made in 1952 (additional vehicular access) and 1972 (to create corner shop and offices). In 2005 the building was complete refurbished and is in excellent condition

=== Modifications and dates ===
- 1952: Alteration by the Maritime Services Board to create additional vehicular access from Argyle and Playfair Streets, timber stairs altered.
- 1978–79: Alteration by the SCA to create corner shop, and use of the building as offices and a parking area. All windows apparently replaced. At carpark level: return of original stairs, original doors to north blocked up, new openings made to Scarborough House, new storage and servicing areas added. At Playfair Street level: new flooring, partitions, stairs, storage and service areas installed. Gallery level: Built during conversion by SCRA of former Playfair's Garage to commercial uses, original roof structure retained.
- 2005: The building was completely refurbished and The Rocks Visitor Centre moved into the top floor.

== Heritage listing ==
As at 30 March 2011, Playfair's Garage and site are of State heritage significance for their historical and scientific cultural values. The site and building are also of State heritage significance for their contribution to The Rocks area which is of State Heritage significance in its own right.

Playfairs Garage is a modest example of a small factory building of the 1920s, adapted for changing uses over time. The site of Playfairs Garage is associated with significant personalities in the development of the Rocks, notably Frederic Unwin and Thomas Playfair. There is potential archaeological significance from pre-existing street surfaces. The building forms part of the visual and functional fabric of this part of The Rocks, particularly as an element of the streetscape in Argyle Street, and as a link in the chain of development of utilitarian buildings in The Rocks since the early 1800s.

Significant Fabric: Masonry walls, roof profile, timber windows; timber floor structure above (carpark level); timber floors, timber posts and beams (Playfair St. level); timber main posts, roof trusses and clerestory structure (gallery level).

Penrhyn House was listed on the New South Wales State Heritage Register on 10 May 2002 having satisfied the following criteria.

The place is important in demonstrating the course, or pattern, of cultural or natural history in New South Wales.

Playfair's Garage and site are of State heritage significance for their historical and scientific cultural values. The site and building are also of State heritage significance for their contribution to The Rocks area which is of State Heritage significance in its own right (see item no. 4500458).

Playfair's Garage is a modest example of a small factory building of the 1920s, adapted for changing uses over time.

Significant Fabric: Masonry walls, roof profile, timber windows; timber floor structure above (carpark level); timber floors, timber posts and beams (Playfair St. level); timber main posts, roof trusses and clerestory structure (gallery level).

The place has a strong or special association with a person, or group of persons, of importance of cultural or natural history of New South Wales's history.

The site of Playfair's Garage is associated with significant personalities in the development of The Rocks, notably Frederic Unwin and Thomas Playfair.

The place is important in demonstrating aesthetic characteristics and/or a high degree of creative or technical achievement in New South Wales.

The building forms part of the visual and functional fabric of this part of The Rocks, particularly as an element of the streetscape in Argyle Street, and as a link in the chain of development of utilitarian buildings in The Rocks since the early 1800s.

The place has potential to yield information that will contribute to an understanding of the cultural or natural history of New South Wales.

There is potential archaeological significance from pre-existing street surfaces.
