= 15–25 Dalgety Road, Millers Point =

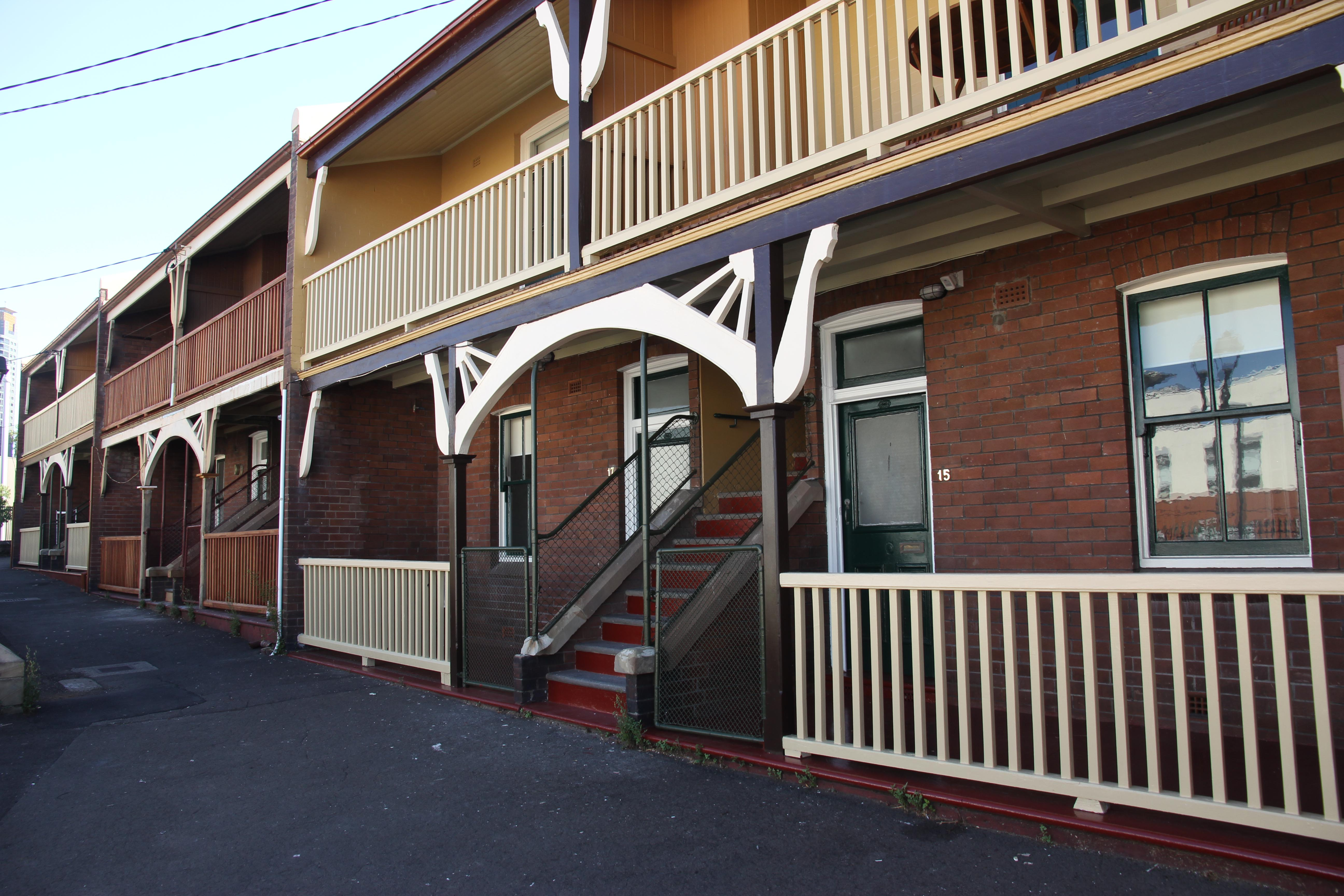
- 15–25 Dalgety Road, pictured in 2019.

- Location within Sydney Location within Australia
- 33.8572°S 151.2023°E
- Location: 15, 17, 19, 21, 23, 25 Dalgety Road, Millers Point, City of Sydney, New South Wales, Australia

History
- Built: c. 1911

Site notes
- Architectural style: Federation

New South Wales Heritage Register
- Official name: Terraces; Dalgety Terraces; Dalgety Terrace
- Type: State heritage (built)
- Designated: 2 April 1999
- Reference no.: 925
- Type: Historic site

15–25 Dalgety Road, Millers Point are heritage-listed terrace houses located at 15–25 Dalgety Terrace, in the inner city Sydney suburb of Millers Point in the City of Sydney local government area of New South Wales, Australia. The property is also called Dalgety Terraces and Dalgety Terrace. The property was added to the New South Wales State Heritage Register on 2 April 1999.

== History ==
Millers Point is one of the earliest areas of European settlement in Australia, and a focus for maritime activities. These are a group of early twentieth century workman's terraces built c. 1911 as part of the post plague redevelopment by the Sydney Harbour Trust. First tenanted by the NSW Department of Housing in 1986.

== Description ==
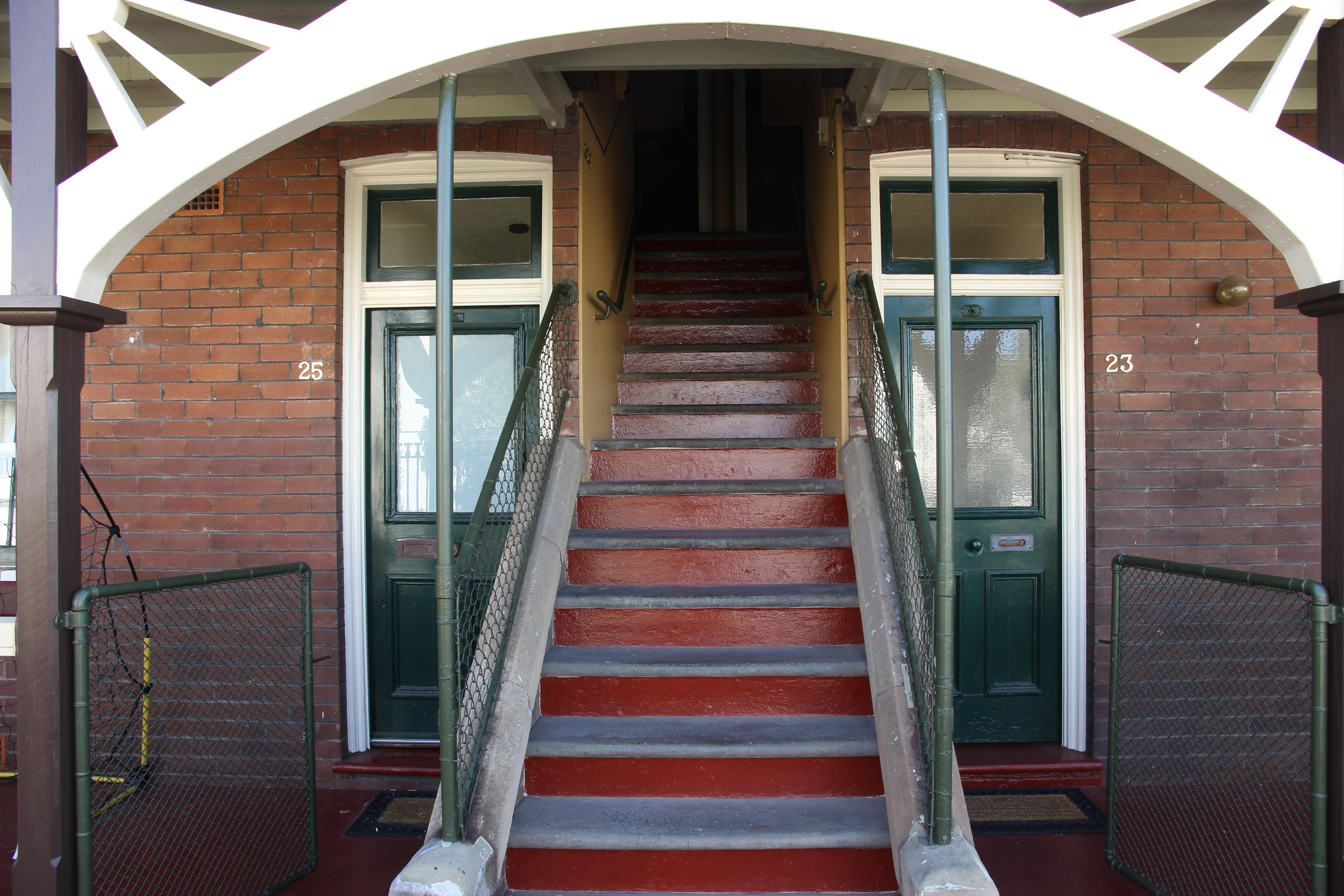
23 and 25 Dalgety Road, pictured in 2019.

These large terraces feature elaborate timber verandahs with ornamental brackets in the Federation style. Also, they have terracotta Marsailles roofs. The terrace consists of a two bedroom units on both the ground floor and the first floor. The stairs leading to the upper units are generally shared by two units, with the entry to the lower units directly to the sides of them. Storeys: Two; Construction: Facebrick walls, tiled roof, timber verandah and balustrading. Style: Federation.

The external condition of the property is good.

== Heritage listing ==
As at 23 November 2000, this terrace is one of a group of early twentieth century workmen's terraces built as part of the post-bubonic plague redevelopment.

It is part of the Millers Point Conservation Area, an intact residential and maritime precinct. It contains residential buildings and civic spaces dating from the 1830s and is an important example of 19th century adaptation of the landscape.

Terraces was listed on the New South Wales State Heritage Register on 2 April 1999.

== See also ==
- Australian residential architectural styles
- 7–13 Dalgety Road
- 27a–35a Dalgety Road
