= 1–7 Argyle Place, Millers Point =

1–7 Argyle Place
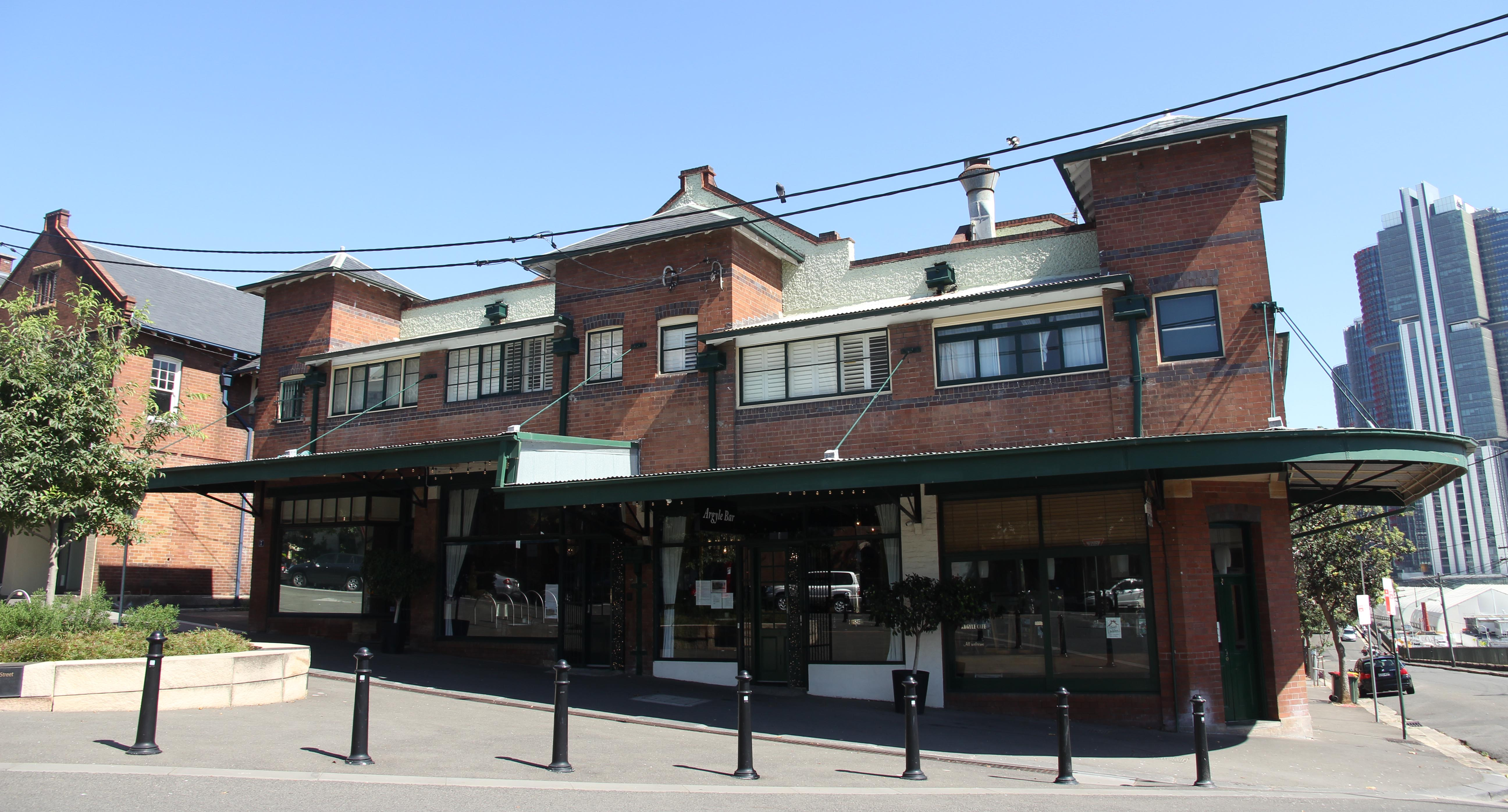
- 1–7 Argyle Place, pictured in 2019.

- Location within Sydney Location within Australia
- 33.8586°S 151.2030°E
- Location: 1, 3, 5, 7 Argyle Place, Millers Point, City of Sydney, New South Wales, Australia

History
- Built: 1910
- Built for: Sydney Harbour Trust

New South Wales Heritage Register
- Official name: Shops
- Type: State heritage (built)
- Designated: 2 April 1999
- Reference no.: 863
- Type: Shop
- Category: Retail and Wholesale

1–7 Argyle Place is a heritage-listed row of shops with overhead residences at 1, 3, 5 and 7 Argyle Place, Millers Point, City of Sydney, New South Wales, Australia. It was added to the New South Wales State Heritage Register on 2 April 1999.

== History ==
The row of shops and residences at 1–7 Argyle Place was built by the Sydney Harbour Trust in 1910 following the state resumption and reconstruction of the surrounding area following a turn-of-the-century outbreak of bubonic plague. It now forms an important element of the historic streetscape.

Ownership passed from the Trust to the Department of Housing in 1986. The shops were threatened with sale to private developers in 1988, but were saved in 1990 after a two-year community campaign. The campaign also resulted in an agreement whereby the City of Sydney leased the shops from the Department, with the council pledging to ensure they were kept as service stores for the local community. However, they were eventually put up for sale by the state government in 2006 and sold soon after.

== Description ==
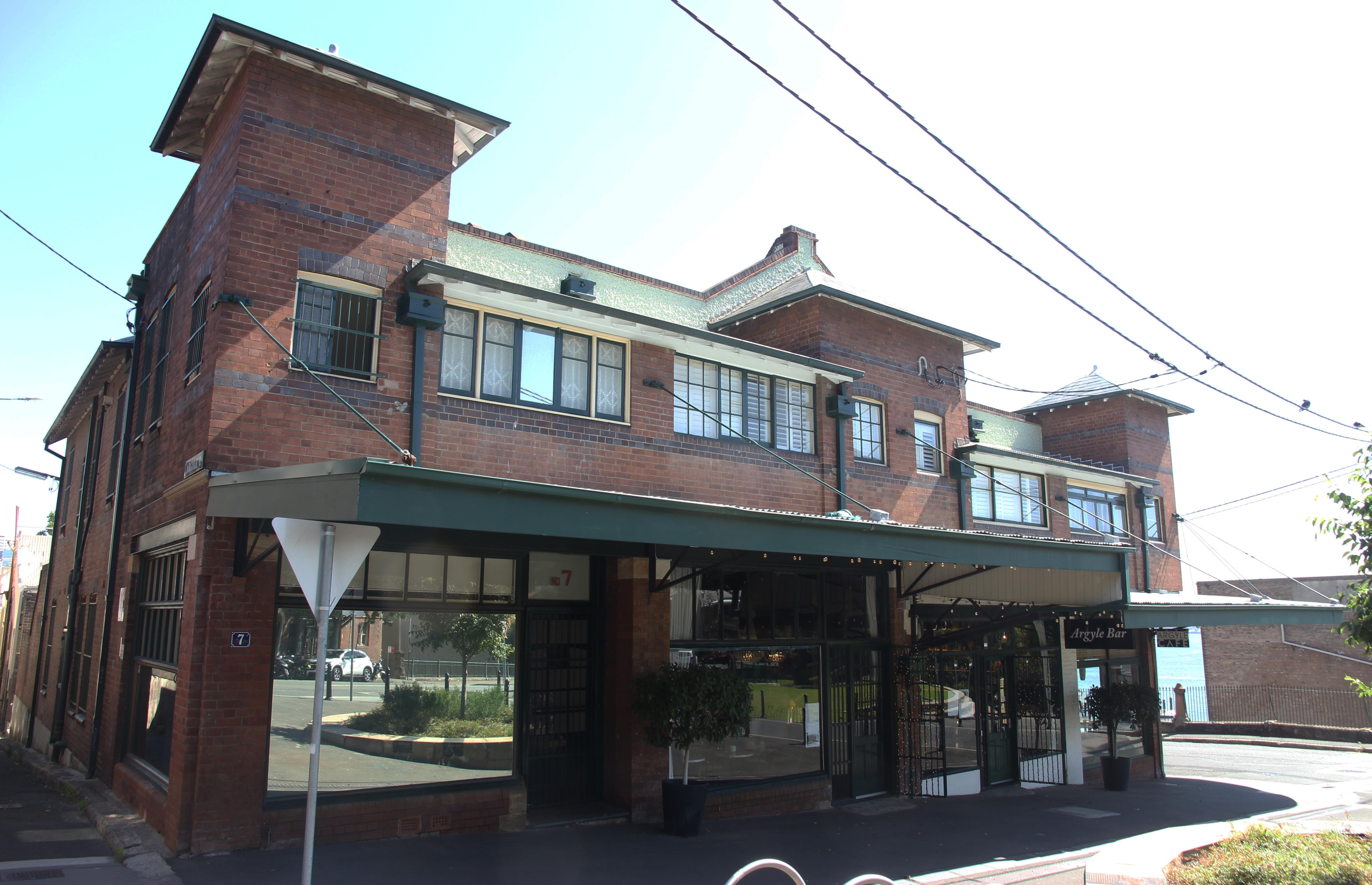
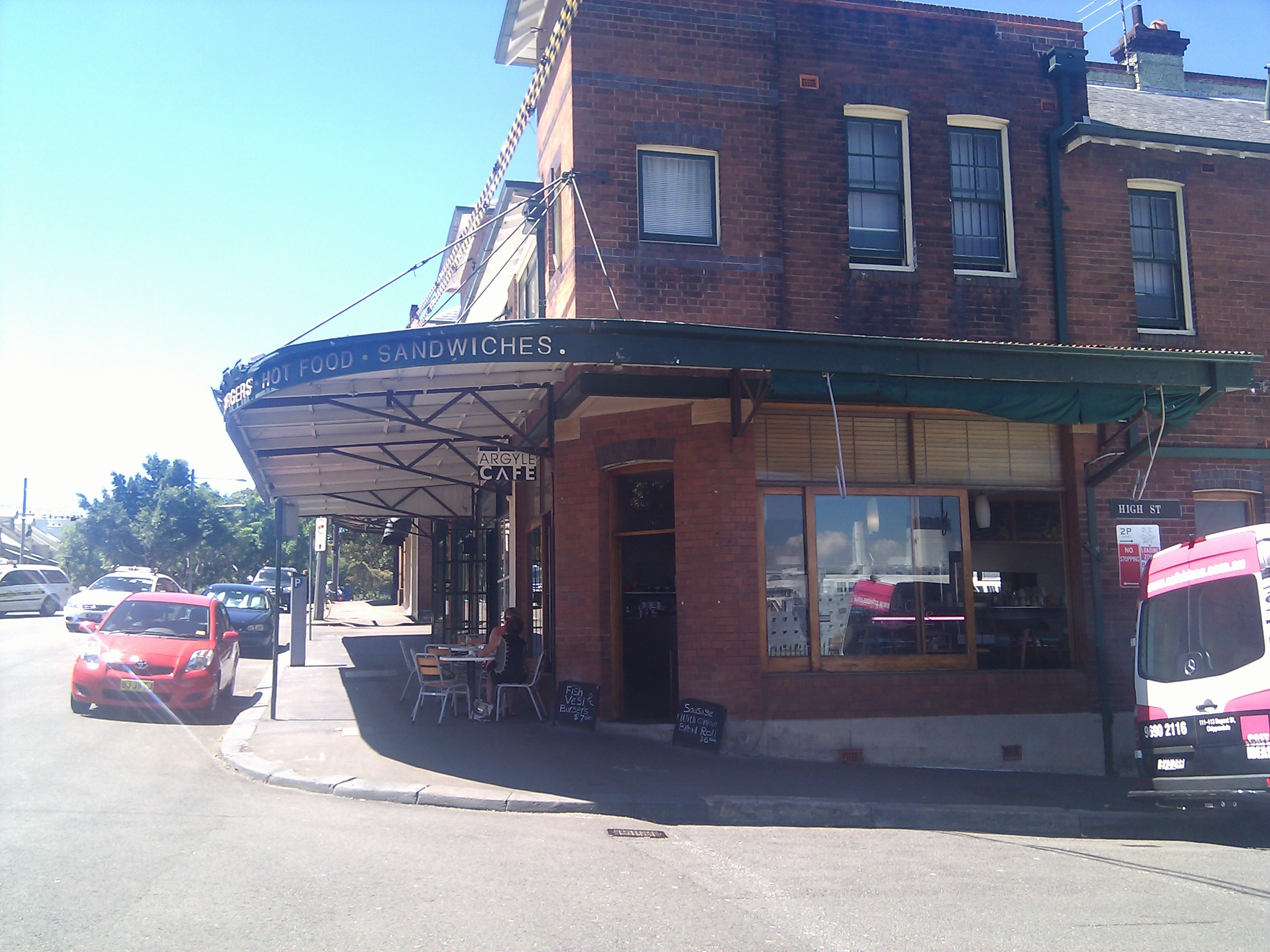
1–7 Argyle Place, pictured in 2019 (left) and 2012 (right).

1–7 Argyle Place is a two-storey row of shops with residences overhead, built in the Federation style. It features face brick walls and chimneys, a slate roof to the main body of the building with corrugated galvanised iron verandah roofs, and painted pebble dash parapets.

The verandahs on the second storey have been filled in, and some sash windows were renewed in the 1990s.

== Heritage listing ==
An interesting example of early twentieth century commercial and residential development being part of the-post plague redevelopment, very important to the streetscape of Millers Point.

It is part of the Millers Point Conservation Area, an intact residential and maritime precinct. It contains residential buildings and civic spaces dating from the 1830s and is an important example of nineteenth-century adaptation of the landscape.

1–7 Argyle Place was listed on the New South Wales State Heritage Register on 2 April 1999.

== See also ==
- Australian residential architectural styles
- 9 Argyle Place
