= Argyle Terrace =

Argyle Terrace – Caminetto's Restaurant
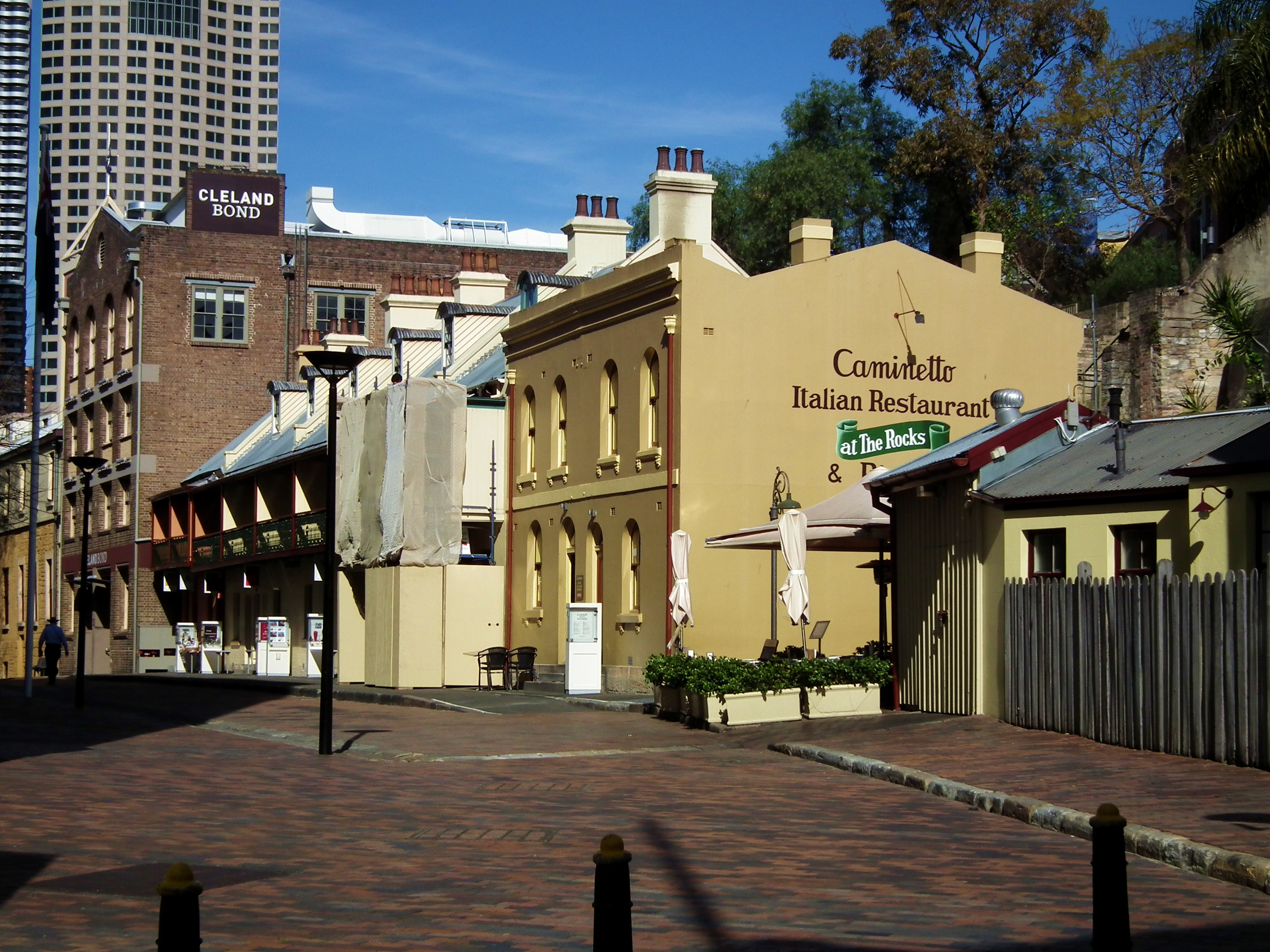
- Playfair Street, The Rocks, with the Argyle Terrace in the foreground, and the Cleland Bond Store in the background, pictured in 2012.

- Location within Sydney Location within Australia
- 33.8583°S 151.2081°E
- Location: 13–15 Playfair Street, The Rocks, City of Sydney, New South Wales, Australia

History
- Built: 1883–1884
- Built for: Thomas Playfair

Site notes
- Owner: Property NSW

New South Wales Heritage Register
- Official name: Argyle Terrace – Caminetto's Restaurant; Former Harry's Bar and Sorrentos; Argyle Terrace (Harrys; Caminettos)
- Type: State heritage (built)
- Designated: 10 May 2002
- Reference no.: 1525
- Type: Restaurant (food outlet)
- Category: Commercial

The Argyle Terrace – Caminetto's Restaurant is a heritage-listed former residence and now restaurant located at 13–15 Playfair Street in the inner city Sydney suburb of The Rocks in the City of Sydney local government area of New South Wales, Australia. It was designed by built for Thomas Playfair from 1883 to 1884. It is also known as Former Harry's Bar and Sorrentos. The property is owned by Property NSW, an agency of the Government of New South Wales. It was added to the New South Wales State Heritage Register on 10 May 2002.

== History ==
The subject land appears to have been largely undeveloped until the 1870s. The street now known as "Playfair Street" was not shown on a plan of the area dated 1868. Since the mid 1870s the street has been known by a number of names:

- New George Street, c. 1873–1876;
- Little Gloucester Street, c. 1877–1886;
- Harrington Street, 1923–1953; and
- Playfair Street, from 1953.

The 1868 plan shows the subject land, part of a large block generally bounded by Argyle Street to the south, George Street to east, Union Street to the north and Gloucester Street (now Gloucester Walk) to the west. A laneway cuts through the south eastern portion of the block, accessing the properties fronting George Street and a large building connected to "Flour mills" located opposite the site. The Argyle Stores occupy the south western section of the block.

The land on the western side of Playfair Street was part of Lot 2 of Section 85 granted to William Carr and John Rogers on 26 October 1838. This land included the southern portion of the site, land now occupied by Nos. 21–31 Playfair Street. In 1839 the land granted to Carr and Rogers was sold to Frederick Wright Unwin. Unwin commenced his "Bonded Stores" in the same year and in 1842 Unwin leased the northern section of his property. In 1870 part of Unwin's land was acquired by William Whaley Billyard who by the end of 1871 consolidated this with a grant made on 26 September 1871. This land was sold two years later to Robert Pemberton Richardson of Sydney, an auctioneer. A Certificate of Title dated December 1874, shows the land, including the subject sites, extending east from Gloucester Street with small frontage to George Street North.

Richardson had by this time subdivided the land, part of DP 143, and offered the thirty one allotments for sale at auction on 11 December 1874. The lots were advertised as "Freehold City Allotments" about Little Gloucester Street and Mill Street. The plan shows the irregularly shaped allotments on the western side of Little Gloucester Street, generally with 15 feet frontages. The two end allotments, Lots 21 and 31 being a little wider. Lots 4 to 31 were advertised as being suitable as sites "for residences for small capitalists". The sale of the subject site was recorded on the Certificate of Title as follows: Lot 28 (Part Nos.13–15 Playfair Street) William George of Sydney, Labourer, 2 April 1875 Lot 29 (Part Nos.13-15 Playfair Street) Magnus George of Sydney, 14 October 1876

The subject site Lots 28–31, were purchased by Thomas Playfair and by 1879, only these lots remained undeveloped. The subject site, now Nos. 13–15 Playfair Street, remained undeveloped on the 1880 Dove Plan. Two sheds are shown abutting the single storey building at the rear of No. 17 and on the north eastern boundary. In 1883 Thomas Playfair commenced construction of two tenements known as Nos. 3-5 Gloucester Street (Nos. 13–15 Playfair Street). The building was first rated in June 1884 and in 1891, and were described as two storey houses of five rooms constructed with brick and cement walls and iron roof.

The buildings were the last of the grouping of terraces now remaining on the western side of Playfair Street to be constructed. Nos. 13–15 were slightly more elaborate in style and detail. Early photographs indicate that the terrace was originally rendered with parapet, decorative rendered mouldings including cornices and string lines and arched window heads.

The houses and other dwellings in the area generally appear to have been developed for the rental market. The Sands Directory indicates that this situation continued until 1901, when all of the allotments were resumed by the Minister for Public Works and the Sydney Harbour Trust became responsible for the site and buildings. The initial aim of the Trust, which was established as a result of the Plague which hit Sydney in early 1900, was to clean up the resumed areas and redevelop them for commercial use. However, the area within the boundaries of the resumption included many residential properties mixed with the wharves and commercial buildings that the Trust intended to use. The Trust gradually had to accept that it would have to take the role of landlord and manage the newly acquired residential properties and their occupants. Much of the housing in the area had become dilapidated by this time and demolitions and cleansing operations were undertaken by the Trust, however, repairs to the buildings that were retained, it is assumed such as the subject terraces in Playfair Street, and construction of new housing, on land deemed unsuitable for commercial use, was also undertaken from this time.

The terrace came under the control of the Maritime Services Board in 1936. The MSB made major infrastructure changes in The Rocks area, however, it would appear made little changes to the dwellings. Despite the changes in the administration much of the area and fabric remained intact until the late 1960s. Much of the city had by this time been taken over for commercial purposes and resident population subsequently thinned. The Rocks became more derelict and public opinion generally regarded the place as a slum and largely favoured demolition and redevelopment.

Two of the four terraces still tenanted by the mid 1970s were occupied by residents who had lived in the street for several decades, during which it appears that very little renovation or modification had taken place. Mr Thomas Kane, the tenant for the four roomed No. 13 Playfair Street, lived there with his daughter and several grandchildren in crowded conditions.

The buildings were transferred to the Sydney Cove Redevelopment Authority in 1970 and along with the neighbouring terraces were originally slated for demolition. Tenders were called and a number of proposals were considered, including the use of the combined site for a carpark. It was an overseas visit by the SCRA's then Business Manager and Director that brought about a reversal and change of plan. The Director was impressed by the aesthetic and financial returns of refurbishing old and seemingly derelict buildings and on his return called for a reassessment of the situation. It was decided that the terrace would be retained and from this time the Sydney Cove Redevelopment Authority adapted the remaining houses as commercial premises and developed the rear of the site as Foundation Park. This marked the beginning of the Authority's role in the development of The Rocks as a tourist destination. At the end of the 1970s the character of the area and use and occupation of the buildings was redefined by the refurbishment of Playfair Street as a commercial and tourist zone and pedestrian precinct. In 1971–72 The Sydney Cove Redevelopment Authority restored and refurbished the terraces for a restaurant.

== Description ==
These terraces, built in 1883, are slightly more elaborate in style than those of the "Tara Terrace" and the other houses in the terrace as a whole. Their external walls are finished in stucco and painted and incorporate Italianate details such as string courses, a wide cornice, decorative moulded brackets to sills and arched window heads. A parapet exists to the Playfair Street facade and the roof is of a much lower pitch than those of the adjoining buildings. Nevertheless, the buildings are representative of the Worker's housing of this slightly later period and share many features of the other terraces in Playfair Street.

Style: Victorian (Worker's housing); Storeys: Two; Facade: Brick & Cement walls; Side Rear Walls: Brick & cement walls; Roof Cladding: Corrugated iron; Floor Frame: Timber.

=== Condition ===
As at 22 March 2004, the archaeological assessment condition is partly disturbed. Assessment Basis: Floors level with street. Sandstone quarried up to Gloucester Street frontage. Evidence should still remain of outbuildings which were demolished in 1917. Under floor deposits may be partly disturbed, they were substantially filled in 1900 to floor level to stop rat infestation, and excavated 450 millimetres (18 in) in 1972, however the original under floor deposit may be lower than this.

=== Modifications and dates ===
- 1972 – Terraces 13 & 15 were combined to form a larger space for a restaurant tenancy.

== Heritage listing ==
As at 26 June 2002, this group of terraces (nos.13–31) is a good example of both the terrace style of residential development and the subdivision patterns that occurred in the mid Victorian period of Sydney, particularly in the Rocks precinct. They are representative of typical workers housing being built for the rental market and indicate the minimal space and resource standard of the time. They formed part of a development which became a slum typical of the inner city residential areas during the early and mid Victorian period, when the degree and success of government intervention in building and health affairs was minimal.

The houses show many of the typical features of the worker's terraces erected in Sydney during the middle Victorian period. Their location and current usage makes them easily accessible to the public. However, the way they have been divided confuses the visual understanding of them as houses. As a whole, the Argyle Terrace clearly demonstrates changes in architectural style which occurred during this period. The houses built between 1875–77 are of a simple, undecorated style, while terraces No.13-15, built in 1883, are quite clearly examples of the Italianate style.

They demonstrate clearly the stages of development of this group and the typical subdivision patterns which occurred during the period 1875–1883. Together with the adjacent terraces at 17-31 Playfair Street they formed first residential restoration/revitalisation project undertaken by the Sydney Cove Redevelopment Authority in the 1970s. The terrace is a representative part of the former diverse character of the Rocks, which included residential, retail and commercial uses, all typically associated with waterfront activities, in close proximity to each other. The Argyle Terrace has scientific and research potential because of the archaeological potential which may remain in the under floor deposits and the rear yard spaces which may reveal information of working class lifestyles and values. The terraces have the potential to yield information relevant to the construction techniques and materials associated with the modest dwellings of the late 19th century period.

Caminetto's Restaurant and site are of State heritage significance for its historical and scientific cultural values. The site and building are also of State heritage significance for their contribution to The Rocks area which is of State Heritage significance in its own right.

Argyle Terrace – Caminetto's Restaurant was listed on the New South Wales State Heritage Register on 10 May 2002 having satisfied the following criteria.

The place is important in demonstrating the course, or pattern, of cultural or natural history in New South Wales.

The Terraces at Nos. 13–15 Playfair Street are historically significant as representative examples of late Victorian terrace development that was constructed during this period, particularly in areas such as The Rocks where residences in vicinity to places of employment were in demand. Together with the Atherden Street terraces and remnants in Foundation Park, they demonstrate the subdivision pattern that occurred in the period between 1870 and mid 1880s. The terraces are representative of relatively simple, high density speculative developments which were built during the mid to late Victorian period by developers keen to maximise profits. The site of the terrace, which extends back to the rock face to the west, and adjacent Foundation Park is significant as it emphasises the difficulties faced when developing in The Rocks precinct due to the topography of the area.

The buildings are part of a group that were the first restoration and revitalisation works undertaken by the Sydney Cove Redevelopment Authority, commencing in 1972. The project represented a shift in both the philosophy of the organisation and general approach and understanding of the history and development of the area. The resultant changes to the buildings and area are significant as they represent a shift away from the predominantly residential use of the immediate vicinity to commercial and public use of the area.

The place has a strong or special association with a person, or group of persons, of importance of cultural or natural history of New South Wales's history.

The Terraces at Nos. 13–15 Playfair Street are associated with a number of government bodies who administered and later undertook major works to the buildings. These include the Sydney Harbour Trust, Maritime Services Board, Sydney Cove Redevelopment Authority and Sydney Cove Authority. Nos. 13-15 are associated with Thomas Playfair, local businessman, Alderman and Mayor, who owned the land and constructed the buildings as speculative dwellings.

The place is important in demonstrating aesthetic characteristics and/or a high degree of creative or technical achievement in New South Wales.

The Terraces at Nos. 13–15 Playfair Street demonstrate the changes in architectural style during the 1880s with the simple Italianate decoration of the front façade in contrast with the simple and undecorated style of the adjacent terraces constructed during the 1870s (Nos. 17–31). Despite the demolition of the rear wings and some internal walls and features the terraces retain a sense of their original two room configuration on each floor, original spatial qualities and simplicity of the interior and lack of decoration, expected for speculative type development. The terraces are prominent elements in the Playfair streetscape primarily due to their smaller scale and location. Together with the adjacent Playfair Street Terraces (Nos. 17-31) they represent the mid tho late Victorian development of the area and make a positive contribution to varied character and nature of the precinct.

The place has a strong or special association with a particular community or cultural group in New South Wales for social, cultural or spiritual reasons.

The Terraces at Nos. 13–15 are associated with a number of tenants, residential and more recently commercial occupants of no particular note. The buildings were part of a development that became a slum that was, after some intervention, improved and revitalised so that the buildings could continue to be part of the social and economic life of The Rocks and Sydney in general. The buildings have some association with the work of local community groups and Green Bans which brought about a change of philosophy and regard for the existing built environment in The Rocks and contributed to the decision to retain and restore the buildings. The works undertaken in the 1970s became part of what was the first "restoration" project undertaken by the SCRA.

The place has potential to yield information that will contribute to an understanding of the cultural or natural history of New South Wales.

The Terraces at Nos. 13–15, despite some adaptive works, retain their fundamental form and character and many features of workers' terraces erected in Sydney during the late Victorian period. With Nos. 17-31 Playfair Street, they also demonstrate the changes of style in low scale residential accommodation between the 1870s and 1880s. The buildings and site have scientific and research potential because of the archaeological resources that may remain below the floor and backyard areas that may demonstrate the living conditions and construction techniques of modest dwellings in the late 19th century. Their location and current use make them easily accessible to the public and contributes to their understanding. The connecting stair, walkway and platforms of Foundation Park and Gloucester Walk also assist the appreciation of the buildings and site.

The place possesses uncommon, rare or endangered aspects of the cultural or natural history of New South Wales.

There are a number of terraces constructed in the mid to late 19th century remaining in The Rocks area, however, with the Atherden Street Terraces, the terraces are one of the few groupings of modest, speculative dwellings with Italianate details remaining in The Rocks area. Similar examples, however, remain in other inner city suburbs such Paddington and Surry Hills. With Nos. 17–31, Nos. 13–15 Playfair Street are the only "residential" scaled buildings now remaining in Playfair Street which is now characterised by larger commercial buildings. With the Atherden Street Terraces these form an important reminder of the predominantly residential character of the immediate area.

The place is important in demonstrating the principal characteristics of a class of cultural or natural places/environments in New South Wales.

Whilst the rear of the buildings have been altered and buildings are now used for commercial purposes the Terraces are good representative examples of late 19th century workers' and speculatively built dwellings that retain their fundamental "residential" form and character and relationship to the street.

== See also ==
- Australian residential architectural styles

== Bibliography ==
- Grants index.
- "Rocks Self-Guided Tour". 2007.
- Attraction Homepage (2007). Rocks Self-Guided Tour.
- Green, Annette (1988). Argyle Terrace & Foundation Park Statement of Significance and Conservation Guidelines.
- Perumal Murphy Alessi Pty Ltd, Heritage Consultants (2006). Argyle Terrace, Nos. 13-15 Playfair Street, The Rocks, Conservation Management Plan.
- SCRA (1979). Building Data Sheet PS/01.
- Sydney Cove Authority (SCA) (1998). SCA Register 1979-1998.
- Tropman & Tropman Architects (1993). 'Preliminary Conservation Plan', The Argyle Terrace (Nos.13-31), Playfair Street, The Rocks.
