= Playfair Street Terraces =

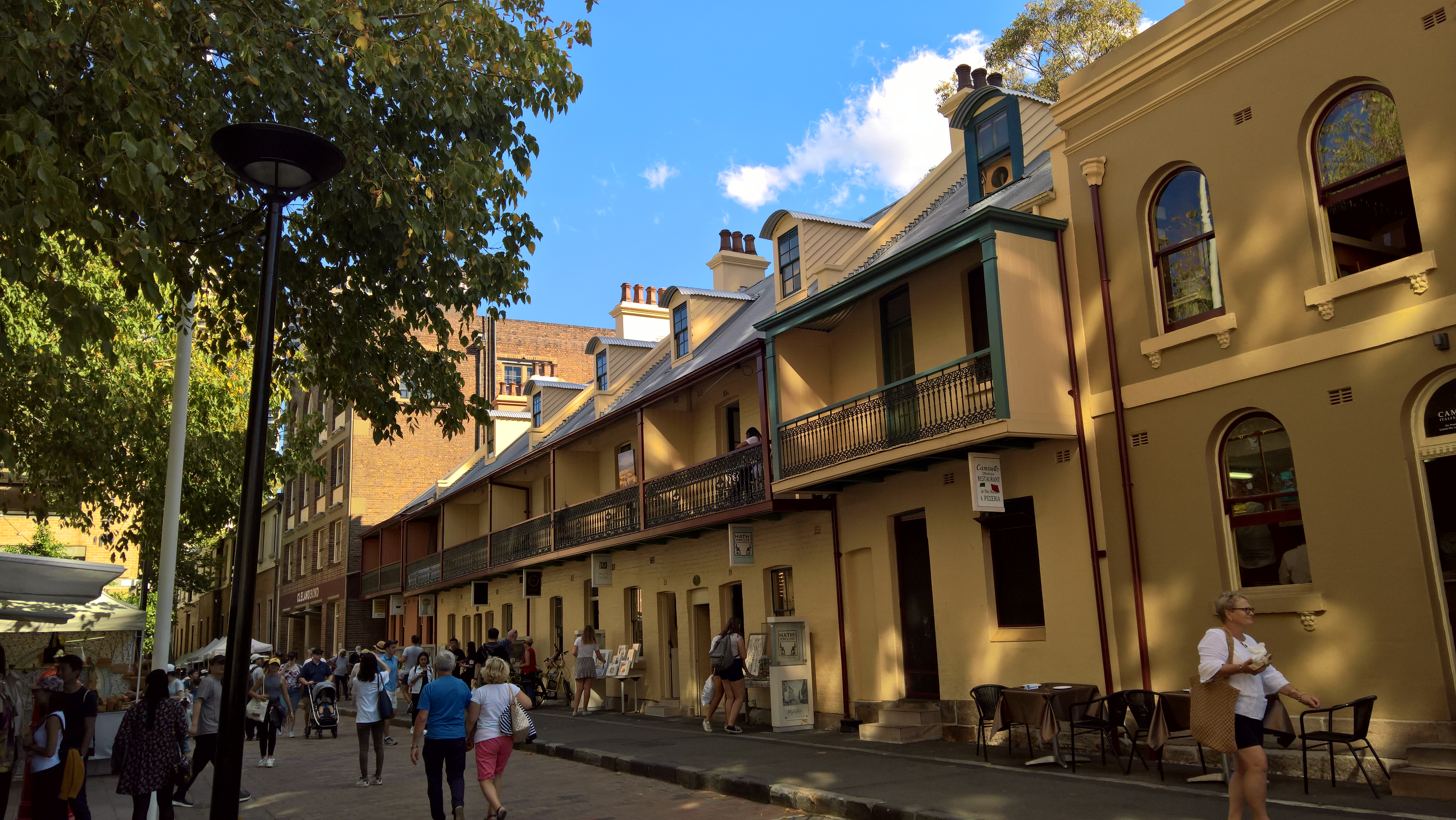
- Playfair Street Terraces, 17–31 Playfair Street, The Rocks, NSW

- Location within Sydney Location within Australia
- 33°51′30″S 151°12′29″E
- Location: 17–31 Playfair Street, The Rocks, City of Sydney, New South Wales, Australia

History
- Built: 1875–1877

Site notes
- Owner: Property NSW

New South Wales Heritage Register
- Official name: Playfair Street Terraces; Tara Terrace (Nos 19-27); Argyle Terrace
- Type: State heritage (built)
- Designated: 10 May 2002
- Reference no.: 1569
- Type: Terrace
- Category: Residential buildings (private)

Playfair Street Terraces is a heritage-listed former residence and now shops located at 17–31 Playfair Street in the inner city Sydney suburb of The Rocks in the City of Sydney local government area of New South Wales, Australia. It was built from 1875 to 1877. It is also known as Tara Terrace (Nos 19-27) and Argyle Terrace. The property is owned by Property NSW, an agency of the Government of New South Wales. It was added to the New South Wales State Heritage Register on 10 May 2002.

== History ==
The subject land appears to have been largely undeveloped until the 1870s. The street now known as "Playfair Street" was not shown on a plan of the area dated 1868. Since the mid 1870s the street has been known by a number of names:

- New George St, c. 1873–1876;
- Little Gloucester Street, c. 1877–1886;
- Harrington Street, 1923–1953; and
- Playfair Street, since 1953.

The 1868 plan shows a laneway cuts through the south eastern portion of the block, accessing the properties fronting George St and a large building connected to Flour mills located opposite the site. The Argyle Stores occupy the south western section of the block.

The land on the western side of Playfair Street was part of Lot 2 of Section 85 granted to William Carr and John Rogers on 26 October 1838. This land included the southern portion of the site, land now occupied by Nos. 21–31 Playfair Street. In 1839 the land granted to Carr and Rogers was sold to Frederick Wright Unwin. Unwin commenced his Bonded Stores in the same year. In 1842 Unwin leased the northern section of his property and continued to develop the southern portion of his site.

In 1870 part of Unwin's land was acquired by William Whaley Billyard who by the end of 1871 consolidated this with a grant made on 26 September 1871. This land was sold two years later to Robert Pemberton Richardson of Sydney, an auctioneer. A Certificate of Title dated December 187431, shows the land, including the subject sites, extending east from Gloucester Street with small frontage to George St North. Richardson had by this time subdivided the land, part of DP 143 and offered the thirty one allotments for sale at auction on 11 December 1874. The lots were advertised as Freehold City Allotments about Little Gloucester Street and Mill Street.

The plan shows the irregularly shaped allotments on the western side of Little Gloucester Street, generally with 4.6-metre (15 ft) frontages. The two end allotments, Lots 21 and 31 being a little wider. Lots 4 to 31 were advertised as being suitable as sites "for residences for small capitalists".

The sale of the subject sites were recorded on the Certificate of Title as follows:

- Lot 21 (Nos. 29–31 Playfair Street) John Nicholson of Sydney, 6 January 1875
- Lots 22 & 23 (Nos. 25–27 Playfair Street) Bartholomew Higgins of Sydney, policeman, 6 January 1875
- Lot 24 (No. 23 Playfair Street) John Kearney of Sydney, policeman, 6 January 1875
- Lots 25 & 26 (Nos. 19–21 Playfair Street) John Murphy of Sydney, publican, 18 January 1875
- Lot 27 (No. 17 Playfair Street) John Murphy of Sydney, publican, 15 September 1876
- Lot 28 (Part Nos. 13–15 Playfair Street) William George of Sydney, labourer, 2 April 1875
- Lot 29 (Part Nos. 13–15 Playfair Street) Magnus George of Sydney, 14 October 1876

Most of these purchasers retained ownership until 1901, when the land was resumed. However, in 1876, Nicholson sold approximately half of Lot 21 (facing Little Gloucester St) to Enoch Rees, a stonemason of Sydney. Two years later it was again transferred to Michael O'Flaherty, a coal merchant of Pyrmont. Nicholson retained the western portion of the original allotment until 1898. Lots 28–31 were purchased by Thomas Playfair and by 1879, only these lots remained undeveloped.

New George Street (now Playfair Street) was first listed in the Sands Directory in 1873. In 1875 no residents were listed, however, in the following year a terrace of five houses, probably on Lots 22–26 (Nos. 19–27) had been built and occupied. A sewer plan dated 28th Aug 1875 indicates five buildings on the site, in the area between the Argyle Bond to the south and Mill to the east. In 1876 it would appear that Enoch Rees built a pair of two storey houses, Nos. 29 and 31, after his purchase of the eastern half of the allotment from Nicholson. In 1877 the Sands Directory notes No. 7 Little Gloucester Street (now No. 17 Playfair Street) was "in course of erection". It would appear that the single house on Lot 27 (No. 17 Playfair Street) was constructed by John Murphy shortly after his purchase of that block in late 1876. By 1882 a total of 19 houses had been constructed on Lots 21 to 27, with eight fronting Little Gloucester Street, eight to Gloucester Walk and three in between. The largest developer was John Murphy who erected nine houses on his three allotments, by using the rear yards of Nos. 17–21 Playfair Street. It seems unlikely that the three separate purchasers of the land now occupied by Nos. 19–27 Playfair Street would have combined to construct the row. It is possible that the terrace was constructed by a speculative venture prior to their purchase, however, the sale of land by Richardson made no reference to buildings on the property. In c. 1880 the row was noted as "Tara Terrace", however, the derivation of the name and connection is not clear.

The c. 1880 Percy Dove plan shows the configuration of the buildings. The two storey buildings facing Little Gloucester Street, including Nos. 9–17 (now Nos. 19–27) noted as "Tara Terrace", are constructed to the street alignment with single storey room/annexes and open yards to the rear. The three single storey buildings are shown at the rear of Nos. 17–21 (noted as Nos. 7–11 on the plan). The buildings constructed on the Gloucester Street frontage, now interpreted in Foundation Park are also shown.

The allotment to the north of these buildings, now Nos. 13–15 Playfair Street, remained undeveloped. Two sheds are shown abutting the single storey building at the rear of No. 17 and on the north eastern boundary. By 1880 Murphy had also constructed another house immediately behind No. 7 Little Gloucester Street (No. 17 Playfair Street), accessed via a passage, the opening of which is still discernable at the southern end of the ground floor facade of the building. In 1880 the Sydney City Council Assessment Books described the individual houses on Little Gloucester Street (now Playfair Street) as follows:

- No. 7 (Lot 27, No. 17 Playfair Street) Brick walls, Shingled roof, 3 floors 6 rooms
- 1 off (Lot 27) Brick walls, Shingled roof, 2 floors 4 rooms
- No. 9 (Lot 26, No. 19) Brick walls, Shingled roof, 2 floors 4 rooms
- No. 11 (Lot 25, No. 21 Playfair Street) Brick walls, Shingled roof, 2 floors 4 rooms
- No. 13 (Lot 24, No. 23 Playfair Street) Brick walls, Shingled roof, 3 floors 5 room
- No. 15 (Lot 23, No. 25 Playfair Street) Brick walls, Shingled roof, 3 floors 6 rooms
- No. 17 (Lot 22, No. 27 Playfair Street) Brick walls, Shingled roof, 3 floors 6 rooms
- No. 19 (part Lot 21, No. 29 Playfair Street) Brick walls, Shingled roof, 2 floors 5 rooms
- No. 21 (part Lot 21, No. 31 Playfair Street) Brick walls, Shingled roof, 2 floors 5 rooms

In 1883 Thomas Playfair commenced construction of two tenements known as Nos. 3-5 Gloucester Street (Nos. 13-15 Playfair Street). The building was first rated in June 1884 and in 1891, Nos. 3-5 Playfair Street (Nos. 13-15) were described as two storey houses of five rooms constructed with brick and cement walls and iron roof. No. 1 Playfair Street occupied by Thomas Playfair was described as wood walls and iron roof with sheds and yards.

The sequence of construction of the subject buildings, based on Sands and title search can therefore be summarised as follows:

- ?? Nos. 19–27 – "Tara Terrace" 1875;
- ?? Nos. 29–31 – 1876;
- ?? No. 17 – 1877.

The five houses comprising "Tara Terrace", the first buildings built on the site, were constructed as typical Victorian workers' terraces. Each terrace was built on sandstone foundation walls with two rooms at both ground and first floor levels. Nos. 29 and 31 were constructed as a pair with similar style and finish to Tara Terrace, No. 17 was originally very similar to the Tara Terrace dwellings in style and detail.

The Sands Directory indicates that at least three of the houses at the western end of the original allotments, along the Gloucester Street alignment, had been constructed and occupied by 1877. By 1879 seven houses had been built, described as Erin Terrace. These were also occupied by a number of tradesmen, including mariners, carpenter and tailor. By 1882 the street numbers had changed to accommodate another three houses, and the Assessment Books note that all were constructed of brick with iron roofs. All but two were three storeys with five or six rooms (the other two were single storey with three rooms).

The houses generally appear to have been developed for the rental market. From the start only one of the properties, No. 13 Little Gloucester Street (No. 23 Playfair Street) was occupied by the owner, John Kearney. By 1879 all of the houses were occupied by tenants who generally remained in occupation for a few years at the most. The Sands Directory indicates that these tenants were varied, ranging from a printer to shipwrights and an engineer. The terraces constructed along the Gloucester Street alignment (now Gloucester Walk) were also generally constructed for the rental market with only two owner occupiers. In 1879 the occupants included two master mariners, a carpenter and a tailor.

The Sands Directory indicates that this situation continued until 1901, when all of the allotments were resumed by the Minister for Public Works and the Sydney Harbour Trust became responsible for the site and buildings. The initial aim of the Trust, which was established as a result of the bubonic plague which hit Sydney in early 1900, was to clean up the resumed areas and redevelop them for commercial use. However, the area within the boundaries of the resumption included many residential properties mixed with the wharves and commercial buildings that the Trust intended to use. The Trust gradually had to accept that it would have to take the role of landlord and manage the newly acquired residential properties and their occupants.

The Trust also soon recognised that not all of the newly acquired property was suitable for commercial purposes and the local topography, steep and rocky in places, would potentially be difficult to develop. In addition, the traditional inhabitants of The Rocks area, such as the wharf labourers, continued to need to live in vicinity to their places of employment. Much of the housing in the area had become dilapidated by this time and demolitions and cleansing operations were undertaken by the Trust, however, repairs to the buildings that were retained, it is assumed such as the subject terraces in Playfair Street, and construction of new housing, on land deemed unsuitable for commercial use, was also undertaken from this time.

The building came under the control of the Maritime Services Board (MSB) in 1936. The MSB made major infrastructure changes in The Rocks area, however, it would appear made little changes to the buildings. Despite the changes in the administration much of the area and fabric remained intact until the late 1960s. Much of the city had by this time been taken over for commercial purposes and resident population subsequently thinned. The Rocks became more derelict and public opinion generally regarded the place as a slum and largely favoured demolition and redevelopment.

Two of the four terraces still tenanted by the mid 1970s were occupied by residents who had lived in the street for several decades, during which it appears that very little renovation or modification had taken place.

The buildings were transferred to the Sydney Cove Redevelopment Authority in 1970 and with the adjoining terraces at No. 13–15 Playfair Street, were originally slated for demolition. Tenders were called and a number of proposals were considered, including the use of a site for a carpark. The decision to demolish the buildings is highlighted by the one Tenancy Card relating to the buildings. The card relates to No. 31 Playfair St, at this time tenanted by a Mr W. Balmain and his mother Mrs Beashel. The entries date from 22 July 1970, at which time the memo notes, "proposed Playfair Street demolitions Houses Nos. 13 to 31". A subsequent note, dated 28 July 1970 notes, "Playfair St proposed demolition of ten houses 13-31 inclusive for carpark". In the later months of 1970 memos and letters were sent pertaining to the relocation of the present tenants and subsequently notice to quit the premises. The last entry, dated 13 August 1971 alludes to the continuing "problem" with the existing tenant. Other file notes dated September - November 1970 suggest the imminent demolition of the terrace in Playfair Street and relocation of the present tenants. The note dated September 1970 lists the houses and tenants involved and current rental as that time as follows:

- No. 13 – Mr T. Kane three adults, four children $3.60 rental per week
- No. 15 – vacant
- No. 17 – vacant
- No. 19 – vacant
- No. 21 – vacant
- No. 23 – vacant
- No. 25 – Mrs N. Macklan plus two children $4.30 rental per week
- No. 27 – Mrs C. E. Moran only occupant $3.45 rental per week
- No. 29 – vacant
- No. 31 – Mr W. Balmain - non-resident, occupied by his mother only. $3.30 per week. Three of the four tenants were to be accommodated in the East Rocks area. Mr Kane was to be relocated to No. 50A Gloucester Street, Mrs Macklan to No. 46 Gloucester Street and Mrs Moran to No. 63 Harrington Street. Each of these apparently expressed satisfaction with their new addresses. Mrs Balmain, was to live with her son at Chester Hill, however, the report outlines her unwillingness to leave. However, by November 1970, two of the tenants had been relocated and the others followed shortly thereafter in 1971.

It was an overseas visit by the SCRA's then Business Manager and Director that brought about a reversal and change of plan. The Director was impressed by the aesthetic and financial returns of refurbishing old and seemingly derelict buildings and on his return called for a reassessment of the situation. It was decided that the terrace would be retained and from this time the Sydney Cove Redevelopment Authority adapted the remaining houses as commercial premises and developed the rear of the site as Foundation Park. This marked the beginning of the Authority's role in the development of The Rocks as a tourist destination. At the end of the 1970s the character of the area and use and occupation of the buildings was redefined by the refurbishment.

== Description ==
The row of terrace houses, Nos 13–31 Playfair Street, and renamed Argyle Terrace by the SCA around 1990, were built between 1875 and 1883, as follows:

- Nos 19–27 Playfair Street (Tara Terrace) – 1875
- Nos 29–31 Playfair Street – 1876
- No. 17 Playfair Street – 1877
- Nos 13–15 Playfair Street – 1883.

The terraces at 17–31 Playfair Street were adapted as commercial premises by the SCRA in 1972. All of the houses were built of face brick with no extraneous detailing. To maximise the use of the site the houses were built directly onto the street alignment with cantilevered balconies overhanging a narrow footpath. Each terrace features a simple two-up, two-down floor plan with attic rooms to Nos 17-27. Nos. 29 & 31 were built with fireplaces to the ground floor rooms only, while the remainder had an additional fireplace in the front, first floor room. The majority of these are still intact. The internal detailing is generally devoid of decoration and as such is typical of this type of working class housing. The last of the terraces to be built are Nos 13-15 Playfair Street, and are slightly more elaborate in style.

=== Condition ===
As at 3 May 2001 the archaeological assessment condition was partly disturbed. Assessment Basis: Floors above or level with street. Sandstone quarried up to Gloucester Street frontage.

=== Modifications and dates ===
- Built – 1875 (Nos.19–27); 1876 (No. 29–31) & 1877 (No.17).
- By 1891 – 17 and 19 Playfair Street were re-roofed with iron.
- By 1902 – all of the shingled roofs were replaced.
- 1972 – The first restoration/revitalisation project undertaken by SCRA included the Cleland Bond Store, 17–37 Playfair Street and the former site of 2-16 Gloucester Street. By this time the row of eleven houses facing Playfair Street was in a dilapidated condition and they were originally scheduled for demolition. However, it was subsequently decided to adapt them as a mixture of shops and restaurants as an extension of the Argyle Arts Centre.

== Heritage listing ==
As at 27 October 2008, the Playfair Street Terraces, Nos. 17–31 and site are of State significance for their historical and scientific values. The site and buildings are of State significance for their contribution to the character and qualities of the precinct and are significant for their contribution to The Rocks, which is of State Heritage Significance in its own right.

The Terraces at Nos. 17–31 Playfair Street are good examples of the typical workers' housing and terrace style of residential development and subdivision pattern that occurred in the mid to late Victorian period in Sydney. Largely constructed for the rental market, the buildings indicate the provision of minimal space to maximise profit. With Nos. 13–15 Playfair Street, the buildings demonstrate the changes in architectural style during the 1870s and 1880s with the simple and undecorated style of the terraces of Nos. 17–31 in contrast to the slightly more decorated Nos. 13–15. Despite the demolition of the rear wings and some internal walls and features the terraces retain a sense of their original two room configuration on each floor, original spatial qualities and simplicity of the interior and lack of decoration and use of attic spaces accessed via tight stairs.

The subject grouping is one of the only grouping of workers' terraces with cantilevered balconies remaining in The Rocks area, although similar examples remain in Millers Point and other inner city suburbs such as Paddington and Surry Hills. With the Atherden Street Terraces these form an important reminder of the predominantly residential character of the immediate area.

Playfair Street Terraces was listed on the New South Wales State Heritage Register on 10 May 2002 having satisfied the following criteria.

The place is important in demonstrating the course, or pattern, of cultural or natural history in New South Wales.

The Terraces at Nos. 17–31 Playfair Street are historically significant as representative examples of mid to late Victorian terrace worker's style residential development that was constructed during this period, particularly in areas such as The Rocks where residences in vicinity to places of employment were in demand. Together with the Atherden Street terraces and remnants in Foundation Park, they demonstrate the subdivision pattern that occurred in the period between 1870 and mid 1880s. The terraces are representative of simple, low quality, high density speculative developments which were built during the mid to late Victorian period by developers keen to maximise profits. The site of the terrace, which extends back to the rock face to the west, and adjacent Foundation Park is significant as it emphasises the difficulties faced when developing in The Rocks precinct due to the topography of the area. The buildings are part of group that were the first restoration and revitalisation works undertaken by the Sydney Cove Redevelopment Authority, commencing in 1972. The project represented a shift in both the philosophy of the organisation and general approach and understanding of the history and development of the area. The resultant changes to the buildings and area are significant as they represent a shift away from the predominantly residential use of the immediate vicinity to commercial and public use of the area.

The place has a strong or special association with a person, or group of persons, of importance of cultural or natural history of New South Wales's history.

The Terraces at Nos. 17–31 Playfair Street are associated with a number of government bodies who administered and later undertook major works to the buildings. These include the Sydney Harbour Trust, Maritime Services Board, Sydney Cove Redevelopment Authority and Sydney Cove Authority. Nos. 17–31 are associated with several local businessman and land speculators who subdivided and developed the sites.

The Terraces are associated with Thomas Playfair, a local butcher who became Lord Mayor of Sydney and an MP.

The place is important in demonstrating aesthetic characteristics and/or a high degree of creative or technical achievement in New South Wales.

The Terraces at Nos. 17–31 Playfair Street are relatively intact examples of worker's terraces constructed in the second half of the 19th century that retain their fundamental form and character. Despite the demolition of the rear wings and some internal walls and features the terraces retain a sense of their original two room configuration on each floor, original spatial qualities and simplicity of the interior and lack of decoration and use of attic spaces accessed via narrow stairs. Together with Nos. 13–15 they demonstrate the changes in architectural style during this period with the simple and undecorated style of the terraces constructed during the 1870s (Nos. 17–31) in contrast to the slightly more decorated Nos. 13–15 which were constructed in the 1880s and feature Italianate decoration popular at this time. The terraces are prominent elements in the Playfair streetscape primarily due to their smaller scale and are an integral part of a diverse residential/ commercial character of the place.

The place has a strong or special association with a particular community or cultural group in New South Wales for social, cultural or spiritual reasons.

The Terraces at Nos. 17–31 are associated with a number of tenants, residential and more recently commercial occupants of no particular note. The buildings were part of a development that became a slum that was, after some intervention, improved and revitalised so that the buildings could continue to be part of the social and economic life of The Rocks and Sydney in general. The buildings have some association with the work of local community groups and green bans in that they mark a change of philosophy and regard for the existing built environment in The Rocks and contributed to the decision to retain and restore the buildings. The works undertaken in the 1970s became what was the first restoration project undertaken by the SCRA.

The place has potential to yield information that will contribute to an understanding of the cultural or natural history of New South Wales.

The Terraces at Nos. 17–31, despite some adaptive works, retain their fundamental form and character and many features of typical workers' terraces erected in Sydney during the mid to late Victorian period. However, the division of storeys, particularly Nos. 19, 29 and 31, confuses the interpretation of the buildings and their original form as individual dwellings. With the adjoined terraces at Nos. 13–15, the grouping also demonstrates the changes of style in low scale residential accommodation between the 1870s and 1880s. The buildings and site have scientific and research potential because of the archaeological resources that may remain below the floor and backyard areas that may demonstrate the living conditions and construction techniques of modest dwellings in the late 19th century. Foundation Park to the immediate west of the buildings contain items and elements of archaeological significance that demonstrate the living conditions and construction techniques of the late 19th century. Their location and current use make them easily accessible to the public and contributes to their understanding. The connecting stair, walkway and platforms also assist the appreciation of the buildings and site elements.

The place possesses uncommon, rare or endangered aspects of the cultural or natural history of New South Wales.

There are a number of terraces constructed in the mid to late 19th century remaining in The Rocks area, however, the subject grouping is one of the only grouping of workers' terraces with cantilevered balconies remaining in The Rocks area. Similar examples, however, remain in Millers Point and other inner city suburbs such as Paddington and Surry Hills. The Terraces with No. 13–15 Playfair Street are the only "residential" scaled buildings now remaining in Playfair Street which is now characterised by larger commercial buildings. With the Atherden Street Terraces these form an important reminder of the predominantly residential character of the immediate area.

The place is important in demonstrating the principal characteristics of a class of cultural or natural places/environments in New South Wales.

Whilst the rear of the buildings have been altered and buildings are now used for commercial purposes the Terraces are good representative examples of late 19th century workers' and speculatively built dwellings that retain their fundamental residential form and character and relationship to the street.

== See also ==
- Australian residential architectural styles
