= 9 Argyle Place, Millers Point =

9 Argyle Place
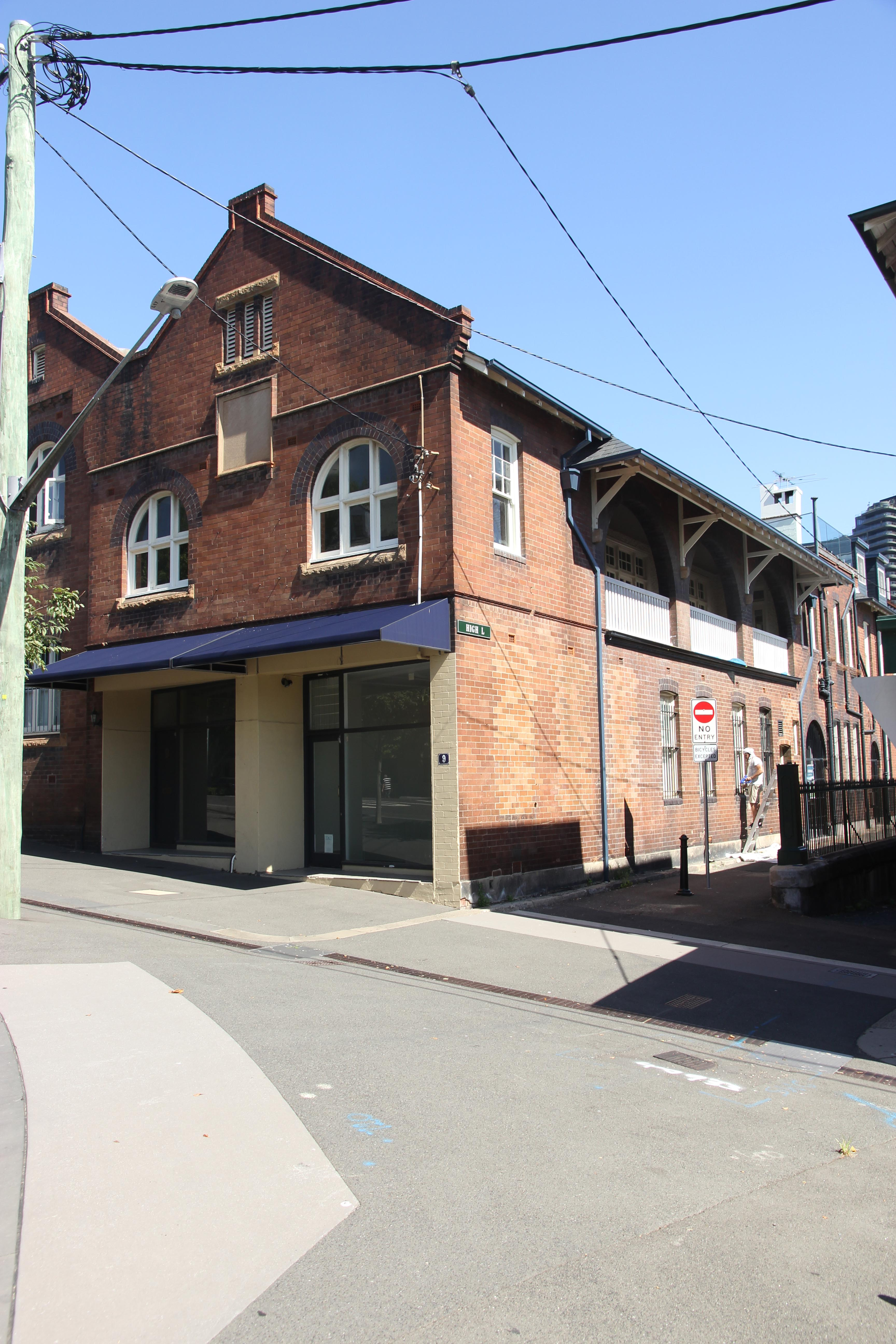
- 9 Argyle Place, pictured in 2019.

- Location within Sydney Location within Australia
- 33.8586°S 151.2032°E
- Location: 9 Argyle Place, Millers Point, City of Sydney, New South Wales, Australia

History
- Built: 1910

Site notes
- Architectural style: Federation Arts and Crafts

New South Wales Heritage Register
- Official name: Shop and Residence
- Type: State heritage (built)
- Designated: 6 June 2003
- Reference no.: 865
- Type: Terrace
- Category: Government and Administration

9 Argyle Place is a heritage-listed residence and commercial building at 9 Argyle Place, Millers Point, City of Sydney, New South Wales, Australia. It was built in 1910. It was added to the New South Wales State Heritage Register on 6 June 2003.

== History ==
Millers Point is one of the earliest areas of European settlement in Australia, and a focus for maritime activities. Argyle Place, a primitive version of a London Square, was commenced by Governor Lachlan Macquarie but not fully formed until after quarrying of the adjacent rock face had ceased in about 1865.

9 Argyle Place was originally built by the Sydney Harbour Trust in 1910 as a restaurant (The Kentish Dining Rooms) with an eight-room boarding house above. It replaced an earlier Kentish Dining Rooms, which had been located in Windmill Street prior to the Trust's resumption of the area following an outbreak of bubonic plague. It was later (c. 1911) incorporated into the block of five shops with flats above built adjacent at Nos. 21-29 Kent Street.

== Description ==
9 Argyle Place is a two-storey Federation Arts and Crafts style brick building with slate roof. Architectural features include steep pitched gable roof form with wide open eaves, moulded brick string courses, sandstone window sills and tablet to gable end north elevation, arched windows and openings to balcony on the western facade. It continues to operate with a commercial premises on the ground floor and residential space above. The building retains many of the original interior fittings and finishes.

Windows have been infilled in one ground floor section, an inappropriate awning added, and the rear doorway has been blocked but may be original.

== Heritage listing ==
Constructed in 1910, the two-storey residence is an interesting example of early 20th Century commercial and residential development being part of the-post plague redevelopment, very important to the streetscape of Millers Point. It is part of the Millers Point Conservation Area, an intact residential and maritime precinct that contains residential buildings and civic spaces dating from the 1830s and is an important example of nineteenth-century adaptation of the landscape.

9 Argyle Place was listed on the New South Wales State Heritage Register on 6 June 2003.

== See also ==
- Australian residential architectural styles
- 1-7 Argyle Place, Millers Point
