= 7–13 Dalgety Road, Millers Point =

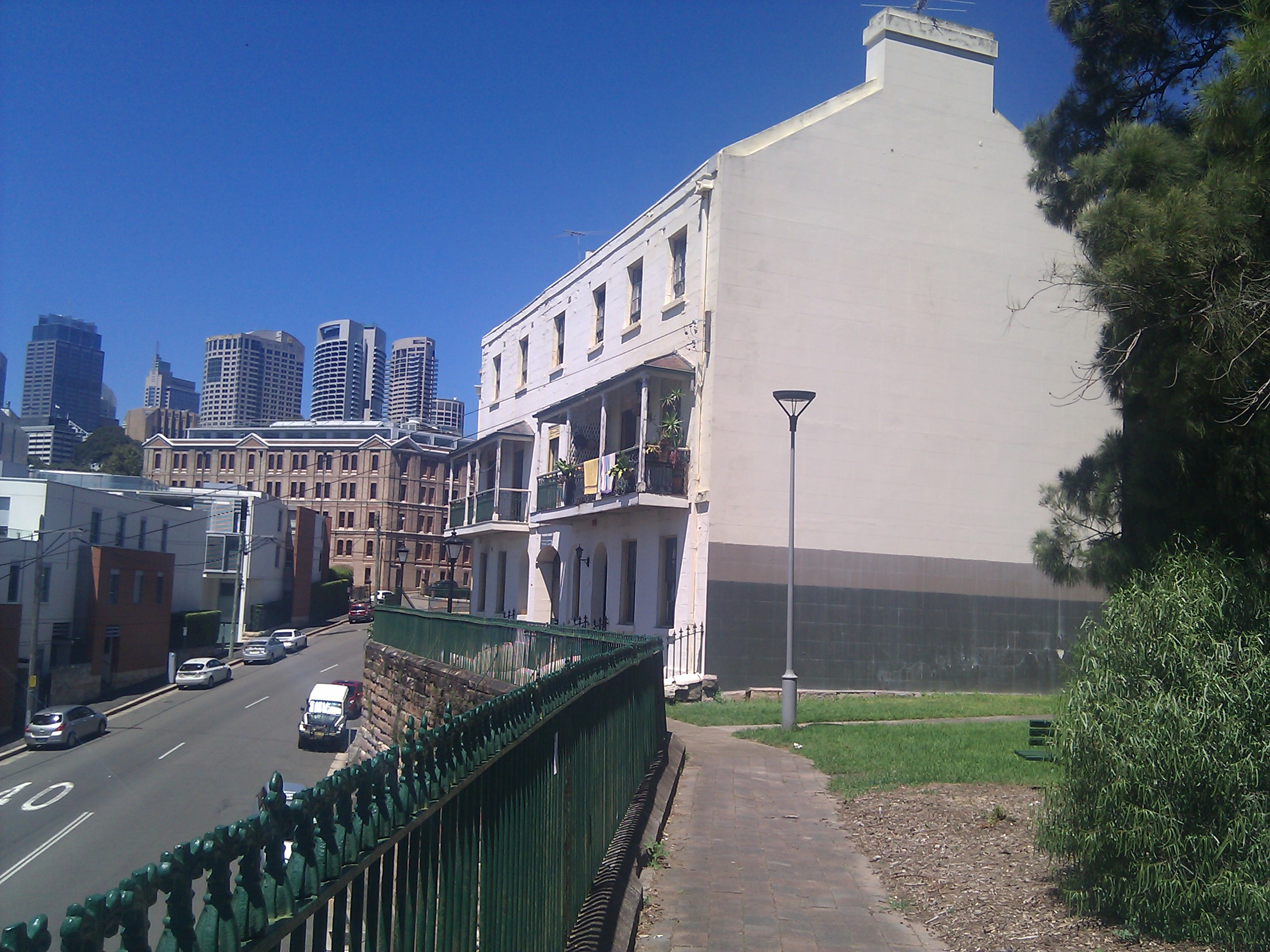
- 7–13 Dalgety Road, pictured in 2012.

- Location within Sydney Location within Australia
- 33°51′24″S 151°12′08″E
- Location: 7, 9, 11, 13 Dalgety Road, Millers Point, City of Sydney, New South Wales, Australia

Site notes
- Architectural style: Old Colonial Regency

New South Wales Heritage Register
- Official name: Dalgety Terrace; Dalgety Terraces
- Type: State heritage (built)
- Designated: 2 April 1999
- Reference no.: 867
- Type: Historic site

7–13 Dalgety Road, Millers Point are heritage-listed terrace houses located at 7–13 Dalgety Road, in the inner city Sydney suburb of Millers Point in the City of Sydney local government area of New South Wales, Australia. The property is also called Dalgety Terrace and Dalgety Terraces. The property was added to the New South Wales State Heritage Register on 2 April 1999.

== History ==
Millers Point is one of the earliest areas of European settlement in Australia, and a focus for maritime activities. This early 19th century terrace is shown on an 1854 map and was possibly constructed c. 1830. First tenanted by the NSW Department of Housing in 1986.

== Description ==
A fine, substantial early nineteenth century terrace with twelve pane windows, central carriageway, with semi circular fan light. This residence has two bedrooms. Storeys: Three; Construction: Painted rendered masonry walls, corrigated galvanised iron roof, painted timber joinery. Style: Old Colonial Regency. Orientation: Overlooking Towns Place.

The external condition of the property is good.

=== Modifications and dates ===
External: Shutters removed, some fenestration modernised, some windows infilled. Last inspected: 19 February 1995.

== Heritage listing ==
As at 23 November 2000, this substantial painted stone three storey stone terrace is an important element in the Millers Point landscape.

It is part of the Millers Point Conservation Area, an intact residential and maritime precinct. It contains residential buildings and civic spaces dating from the 1830s and is an important example of 19th century adaptation of the landscape.

7–13 Dalgety Road, Millers Point was listed on the New South Wales State Heritage Register on 2 April 1999.

== See also ==
- Australian residential architectural styles
- 15-25 Dalgety Road, Millers Point
