= Walter Loveridge =

Australian cricketer (1867–1940)

Personal information
- Full name: Walter David Loveridge
- Born: 13 September 1867; Redfern, New South Wales, Australia
- Died: 6 January 1940 (aged 72); East Brisbane, Queensland, Australia
- Batting: Right-handed
- Role: Wicket-keeper

Domestic team information
- Years: Team
- 1902–03: New South Wales
- Only FC: 8 November 1902 New South Wales v Queensland

Career statistics
Competition	First-class
Matches	1
Runs scored	10
Batting average	5.00
100s/50s	–/–
Top score	1-
Catches/stumpings	3/–
- Source: CricketArchive, 30 March 2015

Walter David Loveridge CMG (13 September 1867 – 6 January 1940) was an Australian cricketer, engineer and public service administrator.

== Early life ==
Loveridge was born in Sydney and educated at Newington College (1880–1884).

== Cricket ==
Loveridge played first-class cricket as a right-handed batsman and wicketkeeper for New South Wales in a single match in the 1902–03 season.

== Public service career ==
Late in 1884, Loveridge entered the New South Wales Lands Department as a cadet draughtsman and remained in the state's public service until his retirement in 1930, due to ill health. From the position of inspector in the State Treasury, Loveridge was appointed a member of the New South Wales Public Service Board on 23 April 1920 and later served as chairman. In 1930 he was appointed a Companion of the Order of St Michael and St George for his service as President of the Sydney Harbour Trust (1924–1930).

== See also ==
- List of New South Wales representative cricketers

== Bibliography ==
- Pollard, Jack (1988). Australian Cricket: The Game and the Players. Sydney: Angus & Robertson. ISBN 0-207-15269-1.
