= Cleland Bond Store =

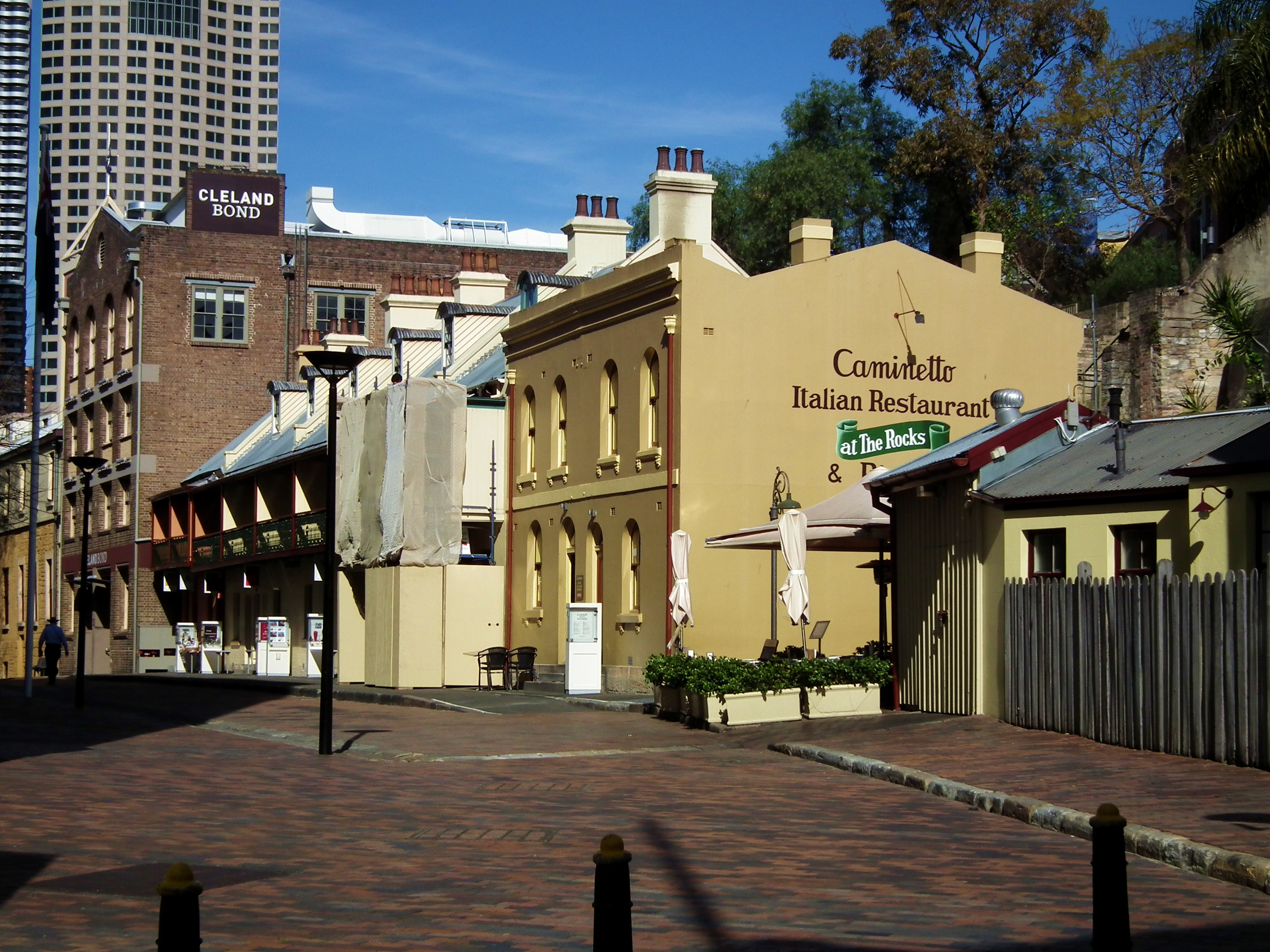
- Playfair Street, The Rocks, with the Cleland Bond Store in the background, and the Argyle Terrace in the foreground, pictured in 2012.

- Location within Sydney Location within Australia
- 33.8583°S 151.2081°E
- Location: 33 Playfair Street, The Rocks, City of Sydney, New South Wales, Australia

History
- Built: 1913–1914

Site notes
- Owner: Property NSW

New South Wales Heritage Register
- Official name: Cleland Bond Store (part of Argyle Stores); Cleland Store
- Type: State heritage (built)
- Designated: 10 May 2002
- Reference no.: 1538
- Type: Shopping/retail complex
- Category: Retail and Wholesale

Cleland Bond Store is a heritage-listed former warehouse and bond store and now department store and shops located at 33 Playfair Street in the inner city Sydney suburb of The Rocks in the City of Sydney local government area of New South Wales, Australia. It was built from 1913 to 1914. It is also known as Cleland Bond Store (part of Argyle Stores) and Cleland Store. The property is owned by Property NSW, an agency of the Government of New South Wales. It was added to the New South Wales State Heritage Register on 10 May 2002.

== History ==
The land where the later Cleland Bond and Argyle Stores would stand became part of the garden for the first hospital, set up in 1788. In 1800 the land where the future Cleland Bond store would stand was leased to William Balmain, assistant surgeon to New South Wales from the First Fleet. After Balmain's death in 1803 the lease was granted to William Gaudry in January 1810. Gaudry arrived as a free settler in 1807 and became Henry Kable's son-in-law and partner in some of Kable's business enterprises. In 1838, site was listed as Lot 2, Section 85 and granted to William Carr and George Rogers solicitors, as trustees for James Shepherd, Richard Wood, Nathaniel Dermot, James Webber and Edmund Pontifex, assignees of estate of John Plummer and William Wilson, formerly merchants of Fenchurch Street, London. William Carr was one of the first members of the Sydney District Council when it formed in 1843.

In 1874 Patrick Freehill erected stables on the site. In November 1877 stables were demolished and a 12 foot wide roadway was dedicated for a Public Thoroughfare along the southern boundary of the allotment, and the remaining portion of the allotment was considered for Public Auction. The land remained unoccupied until 1891 when Allen & Co. owned the land and in 1897, D Wheeler made use of the vacant land. In December 1900 the Observatory Hill Resumption Act was gazetted and the store passed into Government ownership. During or shortly after 1905 Dingle & Co. Ltd Bonded and Free Store became the tenant. In 1912 Dingle & Co. applied for a lease of the vacant land to the north of the stores. In 1914 a new warehouse of four floors, brick walls and iron roof was built there for them. This store which was erected over the previously dedicated thoroughfare extended from the Argyle Bond to the terrace house at 31 Playfair Street. This subsequently became known as the Cleland Bond. In 1933 Dingle and Co. went into liquidation. Thomas McMahon took over the lease and remained as an exclusive lessee until the function of the building began to change in the 1960s.

During Clelands' ownership, few renovations or improvements were made to the building, with the exception of some limewashing, the installation of electric lights and power points in 1935 and a stacking machine in 1951, and apparently constant repairs and renovations to the electric goods lifts. In November 1946, the Argyle Stores and the Cleland Bond Store jointly suffered "the biggest bond store robbery for years". A variety of goods were stolen from Argyle Stores, while Cleland Bond Store was robbed of 400 torch globes. Clelands retained the lease on the building until 1965, when it was transferred to Brambles Bonded and Free Stores, a company with which Cleland had merged. In 1969 Brambles requested approval to sub-let the two top floors to John Anderson and Associates, and Jarvis Coates Furniture. In 1970 their tenancy expired and the building was vacated.

The establishment of the Sydney Cove Redevelopment Authority (SCRA) in 1968 ushered in a new period of planning and development in The Rocks. Initially, the SCRA intended to redevelop the area with high-rise residential and office buildings, and to retain only a handful of historic buildings. However, by the early 1970s, a growing public awareness of the cultural value of historic places and a series of highly visible protests against the Government's proposed scheme forced a shift in the SCRA's approach, towards adaptive reuse, rather than demolition and replacement, of old buildings. This, in combination with the SCRA's imperative to turn The Rocks into a tourist destination, saw a number of old warehouses converted to accommodate specialty shops and restaurants. In 1971 the SCRA invited proposals from interested parties for the conservation and conversion of the Cleland Bond Store and the adjoining row of terrace houses, subsequently named the Argyle Terrace (distinguished from the Playfair Street Terraces), for use as commercial premises. The successful proposal came from architects Fisher, Jackson and Hudson, and was to be one of the first conservation jobs undertaken by the SCRA. Builders Peter Kilmore and Co were engaged for the work, which began in December 1971 and was completed in February 1973. Work included removing existing partitions and replacing sanitary fittings; removing a hoist from the northeast corner of the building and infilling the resultant hole; constructing new stairs from the ground to the third floor, as well as new external stairs; removing existing roller shutters from the Playfair Street entrance and replacing them with heavy Oregon doors; and installing new gutters, downpipes and roofing. Additional work was undertaken between 1975 and 1980, including the construction of ramps between the north wing of the Argyle Stores and the Cleland Bond Store, and the installation of a new timber floor and skirtings to the ground and first floors of the building. A concrete entry ramp from Playfair Street was built and a new entrance was cut from the Cleland Bond Store to the east wing of the Argyle Stores. In the 1990s the building was renovated for use as a department store. Existing shop partitions were removed and masonry walls and the timber structure of the building were exposed to display something of the building's original construction. New stairs and a lift were installed, and the ground floor level was given a new floor once again.

The Cleland Bond Store was again refurbished in 2006-7 as part of the upgrading works to the Argyle Stores. These works were awarded "Excellence in Construction of Adaptive Re-Use of a Historic Building up to $5 Million" at the 2007 NSW Master Builders Awards.

== Description ==
The Cleland Stores are four storeys high and four bays wide, of load bearing brickwork with heavy timber post and beam construction internally. It has a simple pitched iron roof with a gable parapet incorporating a large circular opening on the main façade. The top windows have broad semi-circular heads. Entry to the bond is through a pair of massive ledged and braced doors in the central, recessed double entry bay.

=== Condition ===
As at 15 April 2000, the building is in fair condition; there are some moisture problems on the external walls.

Archaeology Assessment Condition: Partly disturbed. Works in the Cleland Store in 1993 uncovered a box drain cut into the bedrock, probably contemporary with Unwin's adjoining warehouse building works in 1839. A large part of the subfloor deposit remains as an archaeological resource.

=== Modifications and dates ===
- 1971–72 – Conservation and adaptation work included new openings created in north wall, the demolition of the existing timber stair and the opening up of the floor to enable the establishment of an antique market and other businesses of an art and craft theme.
- 1978–80 – All ground and first floors demolished as necessary for new timber floor. New entrance cut from Cleland to Argyle East Wing.
- 1993 – The SCA obtained vacant possession of the Argyle Centre, to enable a major refurbishment and fitout of the Stores by architects Alan Jack & Cottier. The existing fitout was removed to create open floor space to all levels. The centre was reopened in November 1995. Additional air conditioning was provided to the buildings in 1996–97.
- 1996 – Limited archaeological excavation in subfloor, however the majority of the subfloor remains undisturbed and a potential archaeological resource.
- 2007 – The Cleland Bond Store was refurbished and the works won an excellence award at the 2007 NSW Master Builders Awards.

== Heritage listing ==
As at 30 March 2011, Cleland Bond Store and site are of State heritage significance for their historical and scientific cultural values. The site and building are also of State heritage significance for their contribution to The Rocks area which is of State Heritage significance in its own right.

The Cleland Bond Store is part of the larger Argyle Stores which include substantial remains of one the earliest surviving commercial buildings in Sydney, dating from c. 1826. The Argyle Stores also contain the earliest surviving building occupied for use as a Customs House from 1830 until 1850. The group of buildings is probably unique in Sydney in its ability to demonstrate changing warehouse design and construction from the early 19th to the early 20th century. Despite numerous alterations, the buildings retain much of the fabric of their major phases of development and use as commercial stores. The buildings also demonstrate, through design, space and materials, retail practices which are changing or have changed.

The Argyle Stores group of buildings and site are physical reminders of the early history of Sydney, occupying a section of the city which was the focus of commercial maritime activity in the first half of the 19th century. They also provide the focus of present activity in The Rocks. The courtyard is particularly evocative in this respect. The buildings have historical associations with significant figures in Australian retail and social history including John Piper, Mary Reiby, Frederick Unwin, Samuel Terry and the Tooth brothers. Unwin is also significant in the development of The Rocks area. The Argyle Centre historic precinct makes an important contribution to the quality of the streetscape of The Rocks. The building fabric constitutes the major potential source of additional information about the history of the complex, because of the paucity of documentary evidence. These buildings are believed to be among the first historic buildings in NSW to be recycled for new uses in a way designed to respect the earlier historical significance of the site, and therefore represent and important landmark in the history of conservation. The buildings provide clear evidence of early conservation practice and philosophy.

Cleland Bond Store was listed on the New South Wales State Heritage Register on 10 May 2002 having satisfied the following criteria.

The place is important in demonstrating the course, or pattern, of cultural or natural history in New South Wales.

Cleland Bond Store and site are of State heritage significance for their historical and scientific cultural values. The site and building are also of State heritage significance for their contribution to The Rocks area which is of State Heritage significance in its own right (see item no. 4500458).

The Cleland Bond Store has historical significance as the last component built as part of the Argyle Stores, a complex that includes substantial remains of one of Sydney's earliest surviving commercial buildings (built c. 1826) and the earliest surviving Customs House building (occupied as such from 1830 to 1850). The Argyle Stores group, including the Cleland Bond Store, constitutes important material evidence of changing warehouse design and construction in Sydney from the early 19th to the early 20th century.

The Cleland Bond Store, in conjunction with the Argyle Stores, is a physical reminder of the commercial maritime history of The Rocks, which was the centre of maritime activity and trade in Sydney from the earliest days of European settlement. As one of the later bond store buildings built in The Rocks and occupied for the purpose of bonded storage for some 60 years, the Cleland Bond Store represents the continuing importance of maritime commerce in The Rocks area throughout the 20th century.

The building is also historically significant as one of the first historic buildings in NSW to be conserved and adapted for commercial retail and office use by the Sydney Cove Redevelopment Authority, newly constituted in the early 1970s. As such, the Cleland Bond Store is a material record of early conservation practice and philosophy in New South Wales.

The Cleland Bond Store meets this criterion on a State and local level.

The place has a strong or special association with a person, or group of persons, of importance of cultural or natural history of New South Wales's history.

The buildings have historical associations with significant figures in Australian retail and social history including John Piper, Mary Reiby, Frederick Unwin, Samuel Terry and the Tooth brothers. Unwin is also significant in the development of the Rocks area.

The place is important in demonstrating aesthetic characteristics and/or a high degree of creative or technical achievement in New South Wales.

The Cleland Bond Store is a substantial and well-built example of an Edwardian warehouse. As part of the historic Argyle Precinct, and as one of the primary "background" buildings in the precinct, the intact external shell of the Cleland Bond Store makes an important contribution to the streetscape quality of the Rocks.

The Cleland Bond Store meets this criterion on a State and local level.

The place has a strong or special association with a particular community or cultural group in New South Wales for social, cultural or spiritual reasons.

The Cleland Bond Store, as part of the Argyle Stores group, has social significance for its place in the history of the Argyle Stores, an important warehousing complex in The Rocks, and for its contribution to The Rocks area, one of Australia's premier heritage precincts. This is demonstrated by its inclusion on several lists of buildings of heritage significance formulated by community groups such as the National Trust of Australia (NSW) and the Royal Australian Institute of Architects, and representative bodies such as the Heritage Council of NSW. As part of The Rocks area, the place is likely to be held in some esteem by individuals and groups who are interested in Sydney's history and heritage.

The Cleland Bond Store, as part of The Rocks precinct, meets this criterion on a State and local level.

The place has potential to yield information that will contribute to an understanding of the cultural or natural history of New South Wales.

The Argyle Centre historic precinct makes an important contribution to the quality of the streetscape of the Rocks. The building fabric constitutes the major potential source of additional information about the history of the complex, because of the paucity of documentary evidence. These buildings are believed to be among the first historic buildings in NSW to be recycled for new uses in a way designed to respect the earlier historical significance of the site, and therefore represent and important landmark in the history of conservation. The buildings provide clear evidence of early conservation practice and philosophy.

Archaeology: Partly disturbed. Limited excavation carried out on in 1996. Subfloor excavation was necessary for the installation of power, water, sewerage and drainage services and also for the construction of a lift well. During this excavation the remains of a box drain (c. 1839) were encountered. The majority of the subfloor area remains undisturbed and a potential archaeological resource.

The place possesses uncommon, rare or endangered aspects of the cultural or natural history of New South Wales.

The Cleland Bond Store, as a component of the Argyle Stores, is rare in its ability to contribute to an understanding of changing warehouse design and construction from the early 19th to early 20th century. Warehouse complexes of this longevity are rare in Sydney. The Cleland Bond Store meets this criterion on a local level.

The place is important in demonstrating the principal characteristics of a class of cultural or natural places/environments in New South Wales.

The Cleland Bond Store is a representative example of an early 20th century warehouse. The Cleland Bond Store meets this criterion on a local level.

== See also ==
- Argyle Stores
