= Argyle Stores =

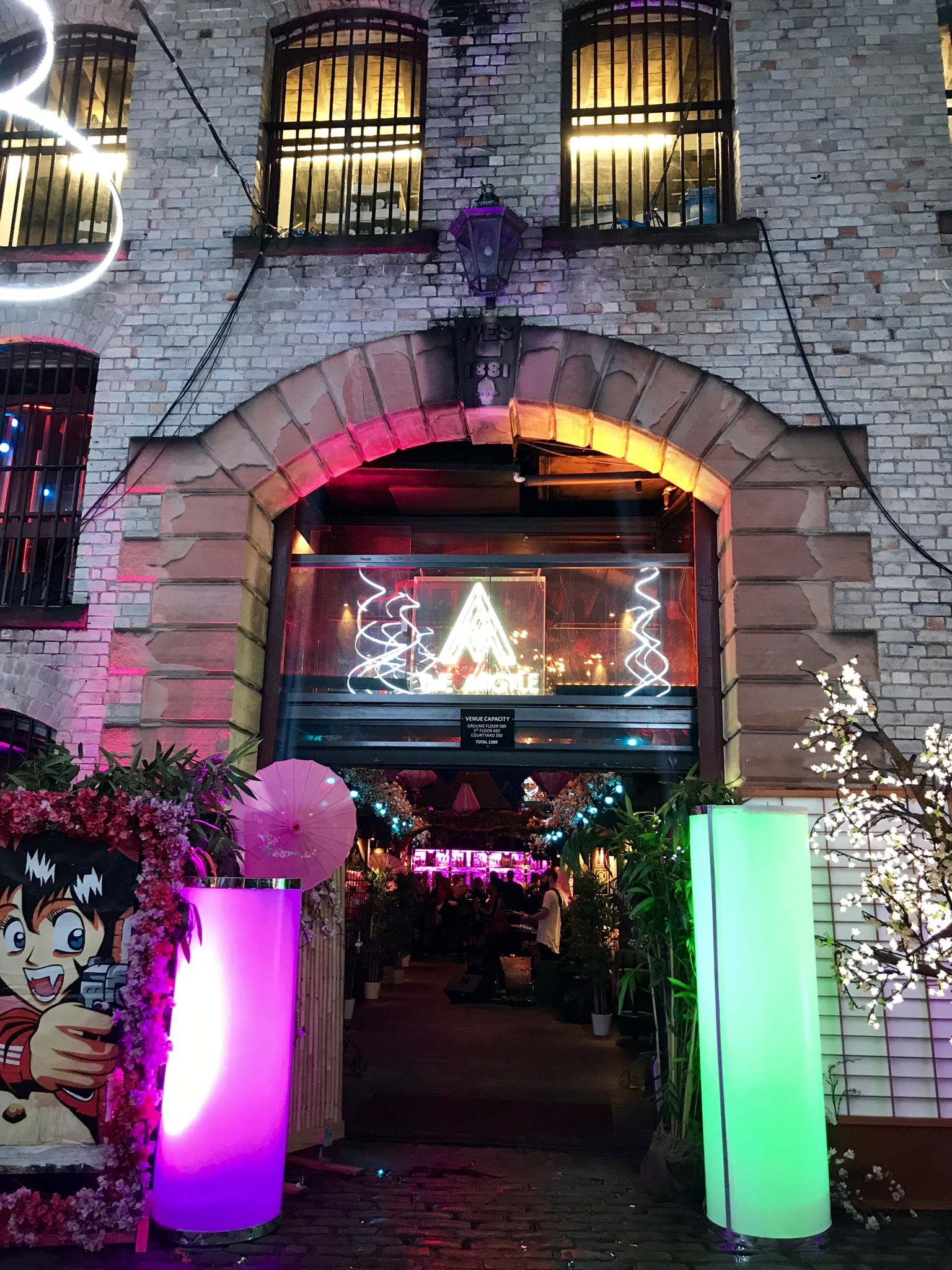
- The entrance to Argyle Stores during Vivid 2017.

- Location within Sydney Location within Australia
- 33.8588°S 151.2078°E
- Location: 12–20 Argyle Street, The Rocks, City of Sydney, New South Wales, Australia

History
- Built: 1826–1878

Site notes
- Architects: Henry Cooper (east wing); Unknown (all other wings)
- Architectural styles: Colonial Georgian; Victorian Warehouse; Art Nouveau Chicago
- Owner: Property NSW

New South Wales Heritage Register
- Official name: Argyle Stores; Argyle Bond Stores and Cleland Bond Store
- Type: State heritage (built)
- Designated: 10 May 2002
- Reference no.: 1524
- Type: Other - Retail & Wholesale
- Category: Retail and Wholesale

The Argyle Stores is a heritage-listed former custom house and bond store that now serves as offices, bar, function rooms and restaurant located at 12–20 Argyle Street in the inner-city Sydney suburb of The Rocks in the City of Sydney local government area of New South Wales, Australia. Henry Cooper designed the east wing, and the designer of all other wings is not known. The Argyle Stores were built from 1826 to 1878, and is also known as Argyle Bond Stores and Cleland Bond Store. The property is owned by Property NSW, an agency of the Government of New South Wales. It was added to the New South Wales State Heritage Register on 10 May 2002.

== History ==
The first European development of the site was associated with the extension of Sydney's first Hospital, with the planting of herb and vegetable gardens on the later bond store site. The first building was a house commenced by Captain John Piper in 1826 at what became the east wing of the current stores, who sold it before completion to Mary Reiby in 1828. Frederick Unwin bought it later that year and completed the building in c. 1829. Designed by architect Henry Cooper, the three-level building had a dressed stone elevation to Argyle Street. Samuel Terry bought the site in 1831. The northern extension to the Customs House was completed by 1835. In 1839, Unwin again purchased the site, and work commenced on 'Unwin's Bonded Stores'. These included an addition to the northern side of the Custom House and other buildings forming a courtyard in the middle.

=== East Wing (20 Argyle Street) ===
In 1826, construction of the East Wing was started under Piper's supervision in his capacity as Naval Officer. As the property owner, Piper sold the land and partially completed building to Mary Reiby in 1828, who sold it to Frederick Unwin. In 1829 Unwin mortgaged the property, and from 1830 the east wing was used as the "Custom House". Unwin regained ownership in 1838, and building construction resumed in 1839. Around 1844, goods such as brandy, wine, tea, cheese, tobacco, flour and sugar were stored. In 1845 the City Council Rates Book lists the Custom House as "two floors in bad repair". It was about this time that the transfer of the Custom House to Circular Quay commenced.

=== South Wing (14–16 Argyle Street) ===
The South wing appears to have remained vacant until c. 1835. The map of 1835 shows a small building at the extreme west end of the wing. It appears that this may have been built when Henry Fisher was "Custom House Agent", and as the City Council Rate Book of 1845 lists this building as a house of three rooms, it may have been built as the residence for the "Custom House Agent". Three other small buildings had been built on the site when, in 1876, Isaac Ellis Ives bought the stores and began to expand their capacity. Part of this expansion involved the demolition of most of the existing south wing and the construction of a new wing c. 1878.

=== West Wing (12 Argyle Street) ===
The West wing of the stores was built between 1840-1845. In 1845 the City Council Rates Book lists the entire west wing as "new stores" of "4 floors", tenanted by Henry Fisher and owned by Frederick Unwin. In 1854 the stores were purchased by R & E Tooth, brewers and merchants who occupied the west and north wings. During this period, the building was used as a bonded and free store. There have been no major structural changes to the west wing since it was built c. 1840.

== Description ==
The original building on the site was a simple Georgian sandstone building roofed with slates, the first use of this roofing material in the Colony. The numerous brick Victorian additions were made in the 19th century during various ownerships. Under the buildings, solid sandstone cellars are covered by massive hand-hewn timber beams whilst upper floors are in heavy timber post and beam construction. The roofs are simple hipped forms, now sheeted with corrugated iron. The courtyard is entered via passageways whose entrances are surrounded by articulated sandstone arches and quoins whilst the brick walls and pilasters to the streets are stuccoed.

The building contains a hydraulic hoist, an important item located within the building. Completed in various stages, the Argyle Stores shows elements of Colonial Georgian, Victorian Warehouse, and Art Nouveau Chicago architectural styles. The building has 3,4 storeys plus a basement with a stone façade, timber floor and roof frames, with galvanised iron roof cladding. Despite numerous alterations, the buildings retain much of the fabric of their major development phases and use as commercial stores.

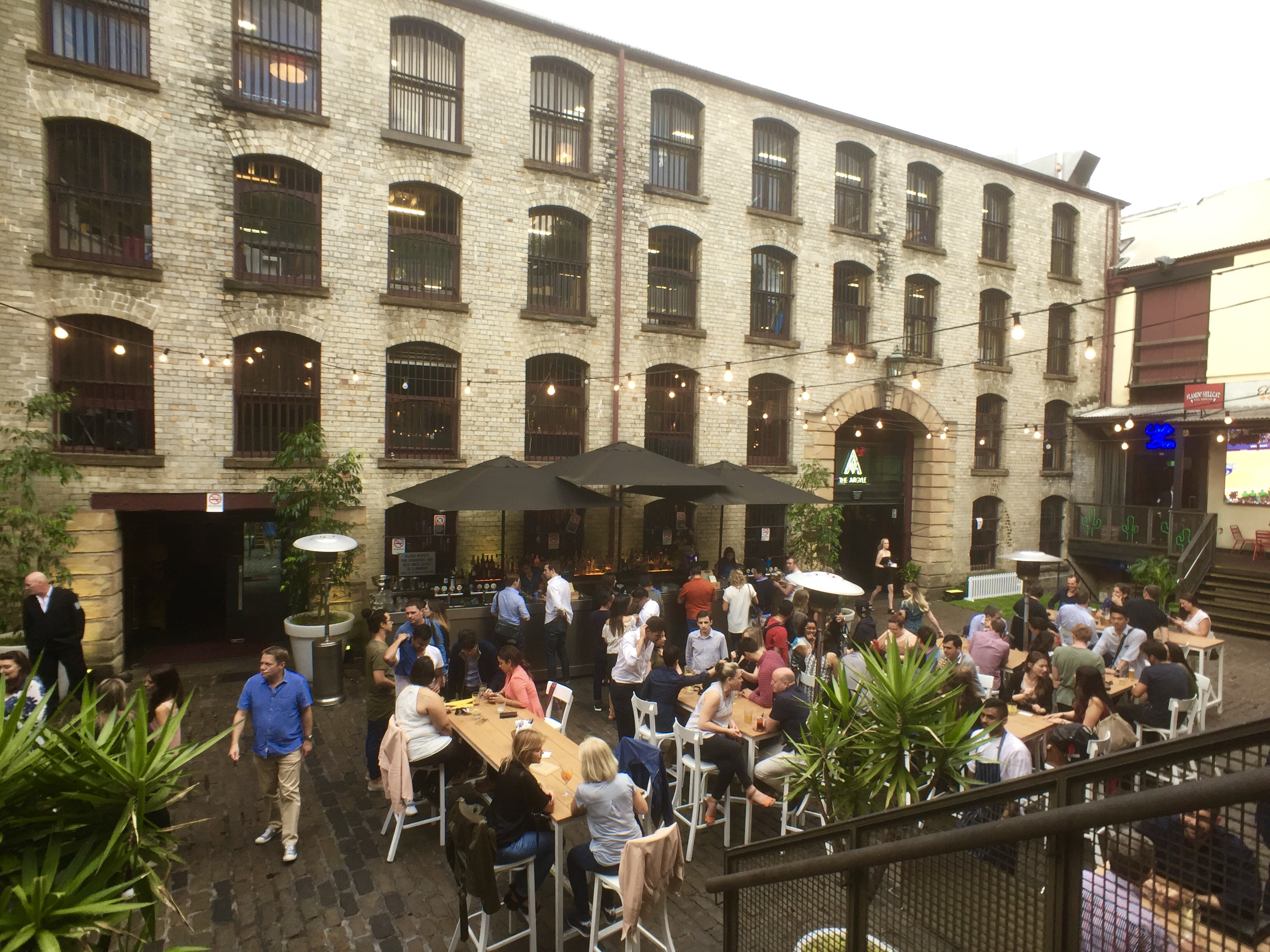
The former Argyle Stores

=== Modifications and dates ===
Major developments include:

- 1826–1839 and c. 1878 – East wing built.
- 1840–45 – West wing built.
- 1881 – North wing built.
- c. 1878 and 1968–69 – South wing built.
- Early 1970s – Conservation and adaptation work was undertaken for conversion of the store for an antique market and other businesses of an art and craft theme.
- 1993 – The SCA obtained vacant possession of the Argyle Centre, to enable a major refurbishment and fit out of the Stores by architects Allen Jack+Cottier. The existing fitout was removed to create open floor space to all levels.
- November 1995 – The Centre was reopened.
- 1996–97 – Additional air conditioning was provided to the buildings.
- 2006–07 – The building and courtyard were refurbished and the Hydraulic whip restored.

== Heritage listing ==
As of 30 March 2011, the Argyle Stores and site are of State heritage significance for their historical and scientific cultural values. The site and building are also of State heritage significance for their contribution to The Rocks area, which is of State Heritage significance in its own right. The listings in the registers of both the National Trust and the National Estate demonstrate the esteem the Stores are held in by the wider community.

The Argyle Stores include substantial remains of one of Sydney's earliest surviving commercial buildings, dating from c. 1826. The complex contains the earliest surviving building occupied for use as a Customs House from 1830 until 1850. Despite numerous alterations, the buildings retain much of the fabric of their major development phases and use as commercial stores, including the hydraulic hoist. The stores are rare in demonstrating changing warehouse design and construction from the early 19th to early 20th century.

The buildings also demonstrate, through design, space and materials, wholesale and retail practices which are changing or have changed. The buildings and site are physical reminders of the early history of Sydney, occupying a section of the city which was the focus of commercial maritime activity in the first half of the 19th century. They also provide the focus of present activity in the Rocks. The courtyard is particularly evocative in this respect. The buildings have historical associations with significant figures in Australian retail and social history including John Piper, Mary Reiby, Frederick Unwin, Samuel Terry and the Tooth brothers. Unwin is also significant in the development of the Rocks area. The Argyle Centre historic precinct makes an important contribution to the quality of the streetscape of the Rocks.

The building fabric constitutes the major potential source of additional information about the history of the complex, because of the paucity of documentary evidence. The history of The Rocks and the uses of its buildings illustrate and inform of the aspirations and way of life of the Colony and, later, the State. The construction of these buildings in particular demonstrate changing architectural and building practices. The buildings and site have the potential to yield substantial scientific, cultural, technological and archaeological information relevant to earlier uses and the development of the area. These buildings are believed to be among the first historic buildings in NSW to be recycled for new uses in a way designed to respect the earlier historical significance of the site, and therefore represent and important landmark in the history of conservation. The buildings provide clear evidence of early conservation practice and philosophy.

Argyle Stores was listed on the New South Wales State Heritage Register on 10 May 2002 having satisfied the following criteria.

The place is important in demonstrating the course, or pattern, of cultural or natural history in New South Wales.

Despite numerous alterations, the buildings retain much of the fabric of their major phases of development and use as commercial stores. The buildings also demonstrate, through design, space and materials, retail practices which are changing or have changed. The buildings and site are physical reminders of the early history of Sydney, occupying a section of the city which was the focus of commercial maritime activity in the first half of the 19th century. They also provide the focus of present activity in the Rocks. The courtyard is particularly evocative in this respect. The buildings have historical associations with significant figures in Australian retail and social history including John Piper, Mary Reiby, Frederick Unwin, Samuel Terry and the Tooth brothers. Unwin is also significant in the development of the Rocks area.

The place has a strong or special association with a person, or group of persons, of importance of cultural or natural history of New South Wales's history.

The Argyle Centre has historic association with several important early merchants including Mary Reiby, Fredrick Unwin, Samuel Terry, and associations with Captain John Piper, the first custom agent. Later the west wing was bought by R&E; Tooth, and thus has associations with the famous Sydney brewers.

The place is important in demonstrating aesthetic characteristics and/or a high degree of creative or technical achievement in New South Wales.

The Argyle Centre historic precinct makes an important contribution to the quality of the streetscape of the Rocks.

The place has a strong or special association with a particular community or cultural group in New South Wales for social, cultural or spiritual reasons.

Valued by the regional and tourist community as a retail, tourism focus in The Rocks. Considered to be an early and successful example of the sympathetic adaptive reuse of a Sydney warehouse. The listings in the registers of both the National Trust and the (now defunct) Register of the National Estate demonstrate the esteem the Stores are held in by the wider community.

The place has potential to yield information that will contribute to an understanding of the cultural or natural history of New South Wales.

The building fabric constitutes the major potential source of additional information about the history of the complex, because of the paucity of documentary evidence. The Argyle Stores include substantial remains of one the earliest surviving commercial buildings in Sydney, dating from c. 1826. The complex contains the earliest surviving building occupied for use as a Customs House from 1830 until 1850. The group of buildings is probably unique in Sydney in its ability to demonstrate changing warehouse design and construction from the early 19th to the early 20th century. Despite numerous alterations, the buildings retain much of the fabric of their major phases of development and use as commercial stores. The history of The Rocks and the uses of its buildings illustrate and inform of the aspirations and way of life of the Colony and, later, the State. The construction of these buildings in particular demonstrate changing architectural and building practices. The buildings and site have the potential to yield substantial scientific, cultural, technological and archaeological information relevant to earlier uses and the development of the area.

The place possesses uncommon, rare or endangered aspects of the cultural or natural history of New South Wales.

The stores are rare in their ability to demonstrate changing warehouse design and construction from the early 19th to early 20th century.

== See also ==
- Australian non-residential architectural styles
- Cleland Bond Store
