= Sydney Harbour Trust =

Australian organization

The Sydney Harbour Trust began operations on 1 November 1900 with responsibility for the Navigation Department and Marine Board of Sydney Harbour. The Trust, as governed by an act of the New South Wales Parliament consisted of three commissioners (including one titled as President) appointed by the Governor of New South Wales. It was responsible for the improvement and preservation of Sydney's port. The trust regulated the movement of vessels and the handling of cargo in the port through a Harbour Master, carried out dredging operations, removed wrecks, granted licences for the erection of piers, maintained wharf facilities and collected wharfage rates, maintained swimming baths. The trust also managed fire fighting and other safety equipment within the harbour. All foreshores, lighthouses and tugs within the harbour which belonged to the Government were vested in the Trust, as well as the power to reclaim land. The Trust was wound up in 1936 with the establishment of the Maritime Services Board.

A number of dwellings were resumed in The Rocks, following the 1900 outbreak of bubonic plague, and the management of these was given to Sydney Harbour Trust. The original intention was that the dwellings would be redeveloped as commercial premises, but instead Sydney Harbour Trust became a long-term landlord of housing in the area.

In its early years, Sydney Harbour Trust operated three small power stations in Sydney—at Napoleon St, Circular Quay and Cowper Wharf, Wooloomooloo—which supplied adjacent wharves. Plans for a larger power station, in George St North, were superseded by the Sydney City Council's construction of Pyrmont Power Station. The partially-completed building became the Old Mining Museum Building.

== Presidents ==
- Charles Carey Lance (1859–1934) served as President from 1913 to 1924.
- Walter Loveridge CMG (1867–1940) served as President from 1924 to 1929.
