= Captain Cook Hotel =

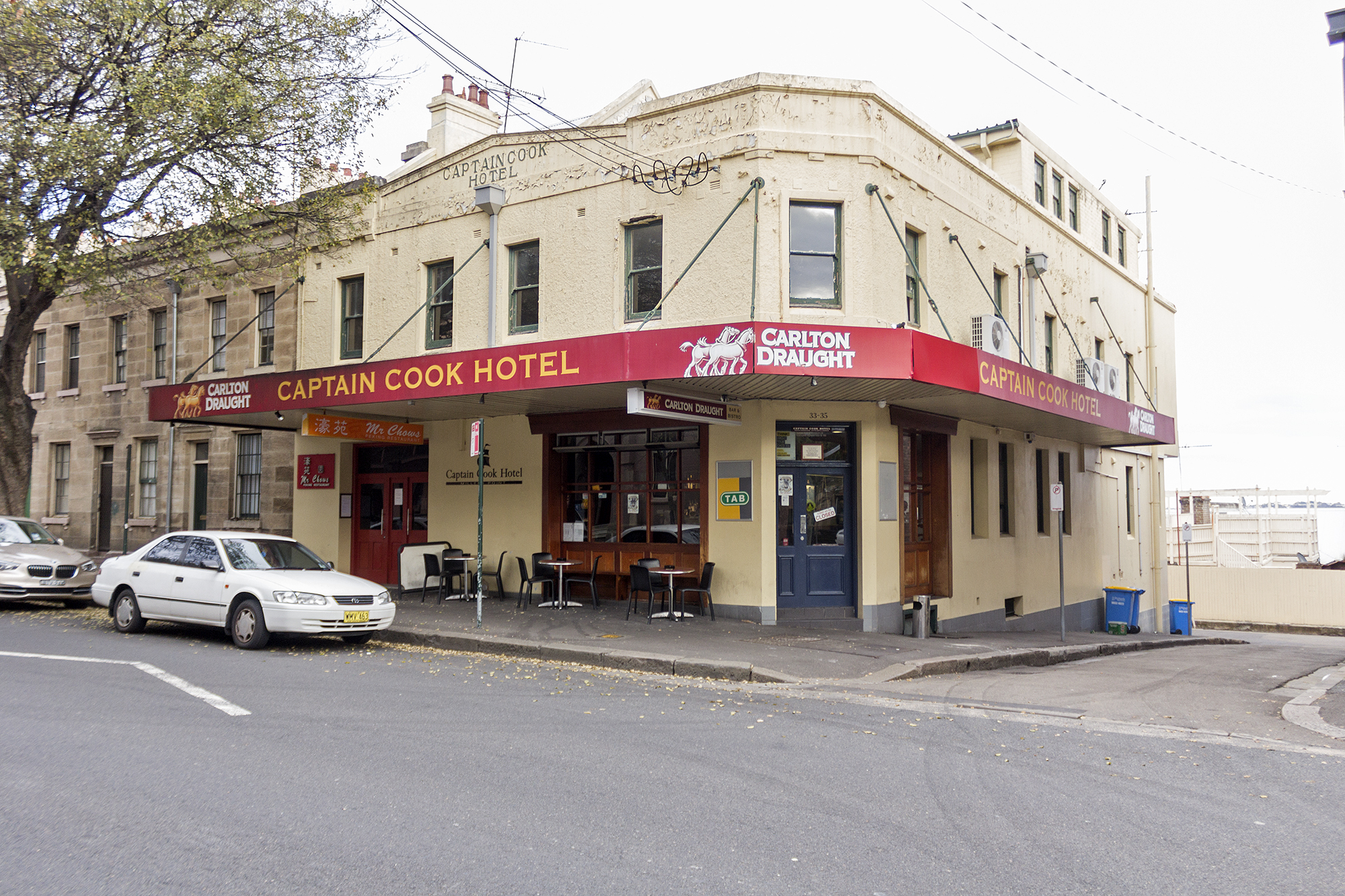
- Captain Cook Hotel in 2014

- Location within Sydney Location within Australia
- 33.8588°S 151.2033°E
- Location: 33–35 Kent Street, Millers Point, Sydney, New South Wales, Australia

Site notes
- Architectural style: Federation Free Style

New South Wales Heritage Register
- Official name: Captain Cook Hotel
- Type: State heritage (built)
- Designated: 2 April 1999
- Reference no.: 511
- Type: Hotel
- Category: Commercial

The Captain Cook Hotel is a heritage-listed pub located at 33–35 Kent Street, in the inner city Sydney suburb of Millers Point, Australia. It was added to the New South Wales State Heritage Register on 2 April 1999.

== History ==
The "Eora people" was the name given to the coastal Aboriginal people around Sydney. Central Sydney is therefore often referred to as "Eora Country". Within the City of Sydney local government area, the traditional owners are the Cadigal and Wangal bands of the Eora. With the invasion of the Sydney region, the Cadigal and Wangal people were decimated but there are descendants still living in Sydney today.

The development of the northern areas of Kent Street was stifled for many years due to the natural barrier of the steep rocky outcrop around what was then known as Windmill Hill (later Flagstaff and then Observatory Hill). Kent Street was only an informal track until after the 1830s and much of the district was used as sandstone quarries at this time. The quarries moved to Pyrmont in the late 1830s and Millers Point began to develop as a shipping port. By 1843 Kent Street was a regular thoroughfare, and despite being only partly formed, it encouraged development in Millers Point such as Holy Trinity Church, the Lord Nelson Hotel and some housing. By the 1850s Millers Road had been developed, connecting to Argyle Street and to Clyde and Wentworth Streets leading to Darling Harbour. The area became one of the most closely packed regions of Millers Point. The completion of the Argyle Cut in the mid 1860s was however the main impetus for development to the north of Millers Point. With the completion of Kent and Argyle Streets their intersection became a major node since these were the major routes in and out of the area.

The site of the Captain Cook hotel was owned by the Australian Gas Light Company in 1860. A photo dated 1864 by the Freeman Bros shows the site to be vacant and the ground level is somewhat lower than the road indicating some local quarrying. The State Heritage Inventory datasheet notes that there was a small timber cottage on the site in the late 1860s in which a Henry Labat lived in 1868. The buildings were occupied by a Mrs McBride in 1873. This building was replaced by a shop in 1875, adjacent to Alfred Terrace erected in 1869 for George Wigram Allen of Glebe.

However a photo dated 1870–71 clearly shows the completed Captain Cook Hotel together with a legible painted sign of the hotel's name. The style of the pub with its overhanging eaves and hipped roofs would appear to predate Allen's 1869 row of terraces, and given that the site was empty and unprepared in 1864, the Captain Cook Hotel must date from c. 1867. This photo shows the hotel as a couple of two storey terraces at the end of the defined row of terraces that have a distinct character from the hotel. These two end terraces form the basis of the present Captain Cook Hotel and have 2 pane double hung windows, a splayed corner and central common wall, which protrudes from the roof. The corner building had a dormer to the street, which interestingly had a twelve pane Georgian window. The ground floor openings indicate that both buildings were not residences but shops or a public building such as a hotel. The opening on the terrace furthest from the corner stretched across the whole façade. A slightly later photo dated 1877 by N. J. Caire confirms all the above points and shows the lower section of the building.

The building reportedly became known as the Captain Cook Hotel in 1876, but from the above early photo it is clear that it was trading by this name as early as the late 1860s. Percy Dove's Directory Map of 1880 lists the site as the “Liverpool Arms Hotel” and apportions the name “Captain Cook Hotel” to a site on the corner of Clyde Street and Millers Road. Given the photographic evidence it can only be concluded that Dove made an error in the legend and apportioned the wrong number to the Captain Cook Hotel. The other hotel appears in photos up until it was demolished during work to form High Street c. 1910, and clearly could not also have traded as the Captain Cook with its close neighbour for 40+ years.

William Bond became the publican and remained so until 1886-87 when he was replaced by John Craig. A photograph by H. C. Russell (Colonial Astronomer) in 1888 shows that there has been no change to the Captain Cook Hotel at this point. Louisa Leistikow became the licensee in 1888–89 followed by Brigit Corkoran in 1890, Richard Page in 1891, and then a long stint by Alfred Cullen 1892–98. Alfred Bird took over in 1899 and then his relative Sarah would see the hotel through the period of the plague in the Rocks during 1901–02.

During this period pubs were the centre of local social activity and provided for a much wider role in the community than simply serving alcohol. Millers Point Hotels were the sites of birthdays, weddings, christenings, wakes and coronial inquests. However the temperance movement was a significant force from the 1870s and the close proximity of genteel residents in Millers Point with the labourers, sailors and wharfies was a source of complaint.

The onset of the bubonic plague from 1900 saw the area bounded by the Harbour and Lower Fort, Windmill and Kent Streets resumed by the government causing a major upheaval to the social network of the area. The wharf area became the site of a massive redevelopment of the wharfs and the construction of Hickson Road had a dramatic impact on the area of north Kent Street. Clyde and Wentworth Streets ceased to exist and Millers Road was reduced to a small stub. The land was deeply excavated leaving the site of the Captain Cook at the top of the cliff with only the narrow Argyle Lane separating it from the drop to the new Federation housing built on the newly formed High Street. The hotel itself survived the widespread demolition that occurred in Millers Point at this time.

Edward Brown would become the publican in 1903 and would remain until 1916. This period saw a lot of changes for hoteliers. The temperance movement found success in government circles and saw increased restrictions on licenses from around 1905. By 1912 the new Licensing Act had empowered local magistrates with the task of reducing the number of licenses in each electorate. The number of licenses in Millers Point fell from thirteen in 1900 to only six by 1928. Once again however the Captain Cook seems to have survived this period. A photo by Kerry and Co dated 1905–1910, whilst partially obscured by a tree, shows that the upper section of the hotel remains unchanged and there is no parapet on the building as yet. Work is underway on the formation of Argyle Lane behind the terraces.

1916 saw a riot of drunken soldiers in Liverpool that prompted a reactionary response from the Federal Government. From this point until 1955 hotels were required to cease serving alcohol at 6 p.m., prompting drinkers to guzzle as much as they could by this time in what became known as the “six o'clock swill”. The policy was counterproductive, not just in the drinker's response, but the pubs would also become less of a community facility and more one associated with drunkenness and socially unacceptable behaviour as a result. Pub architecture responded in the early 20th century by adopting a clean and Modern style that resulted in many original interiors and facades being completely altered.

Taft Harvey would take over as publican in 1917, followed by Thomas Brice during 1918-1920. The State Heritage Inventory listing card makes an unreferenced statement that the pub was demolished in 1920 and reconstructed by the Sydney Harbour Trust. There appears to be no evidence for this and much evidence against. It is possible that modifications were made to the pub at this point, as the new Licensing Act would have required substantial upgrading of the building.

Alfred Hayes would be publican through 1921–1929 and Patrick Hastings would fill out the available owners’ list from 1930–32. A photo of the building in 1940 shows that by this time substantial alterations had been carried out. The roof form remains intact but the dormer is gone and the building now has a new parapet to King Street. The façade has new rendering that has treated the two adjoined buildings as one façade. The large openings on the ground floor have been filled in and reduced to small doorways, and this work appears to be in progress as the brickwork is yet to be rendered. There are additions seemingly in progress at the rear. The photo makes it clear that the building is still based on the 1875 pair of terraces and has not been demolished. Reworking old pubs was a common practice after the Great Depression and it appears that this was also the case for the Captain Cook. For some reason the external ground floor walls were not tiled, as was the common practice.

The Captain Cook was a favourite of members of the Waterside Workers Federation in the latter half of the twentieth century. In 1986 the remaining stub of Millers Road was renamed High Lane and a section of the site was resumed for road widening in 1991. Crumar Pty Ltd took over the license in 1999.

Current photos of the building show that the original c. 1867 large openings on the ground floor have been reconstructed, possibly from investigation of the fabric. The upper-level windows remain in their original c. 1867 openings and the parapet is the same as shown in the 1940 photo. The rear extensions are much larger than shown in 1940. The roof appears to remain as an original element.

== Description ==
The Captain Cook Hotel began its existence as two two-storey terraces joined with a common parapet wall. They were attached at the end of a run of 1869 terraces. The hotel was distinct in style from these terraces built with a more old fashioned eaves line instead of a parapet. The exterior featured two simple windows on the upper level of each terrace with projecting sills, although even the earliest photos show two paned double hung windows. One of the windows is shown as a blind window. The terrace nearest the corner was splayed, and had a large shopfront to Kent Street with a single door adjacent. It also featured a dormer with a twelve-pane Georgian window. The other terrace had a very bold line at the upper floor level (a string course?) with a small awning over wide central doors. These openings have been recently reconstructed after being blocked up in 1940. The basement may date from the very beginnings of the hotel and may have some interesting construction techniques.

1940 modifications included the introduction of a parapet to Kent Street and an external decorative composition of rendered string lines and dentillation that tied the two terraces into what appears as a single building, removing the projecting sills. The changes retained the upper level openings but made significant changes to the ground floor openings, reducing them to single doors. This period also saw the first extensions to the west in a similarly stripped rendered form of simple window openings. These extensions have been added to recently and the building now has a three-storey wing to the west of the original building. A cantilevered awning was added c. 1940. The fitout of the building has been altered numerous times.

The building has retained the original facade but has been extensively modified internally. This is to be expected on the ground floor. It is not clear if this extends to the upper floor. The original stair has been removed and replaced. The building has extensive additions to the west. The interior has been modified as part of these additions. A semi-circular stair in the bar has been identified as intrusive.

=== Modifications and dates ===
- c. 1920: possible alterations to meet new licensing laws, most likely focused on the ground floor bar;
- c. 1940: ground floor openings bricked up, parapet built, exterior rendered, single storey addition to west, cantilevered awning;
- late 20th century: further additions to west, modification of interiors;
- early 21st century: refurbishment including reconstruction of original ground floor openings.

== Heritage listing ==
The Captain Cook Hotel, a two-storey rendered brick building in a subdued version of the Federation Free Style, is situated on a corner towards the northern end of Kent Street. While the Captain Cook Hotel is one of the eleven hotel buildings in this style remaining in the city, it is possibly the least significant. The others are Moreton's Hotel and the Palisade Hotel which hold the most significance, the Sir John Young, the Australian Hotels in Cumberland and Gloucester Streets, the Observer Hotel, the Napoleon, the Royal George, the Fosters, and the Read Raters Hotel. The site has historic significance as part of the Australian Gas Light Company and for its long continued association with the hotel trade since 1876. The building has social significance for the part it played in providing a social / recreational venue and budget accommodation in the immediate area and this significance is continued with its expanded services. It is an example of the evolution of the small scale corner hotel on the fringes of the city, and reflects the social character of the area during the early years of the 20th century. It is representative of the style used in a small corner hotel.

Captain Cook Hotel was listed on the New South Wales State Heritage Register on 2 April 1999.

== See also ==
- List of pubs in Sydney
- Alfred's Terrace: 37-47 Kent Street
