= Argyle Bridge =

Bridge in Sydney, New South Wales, Australia

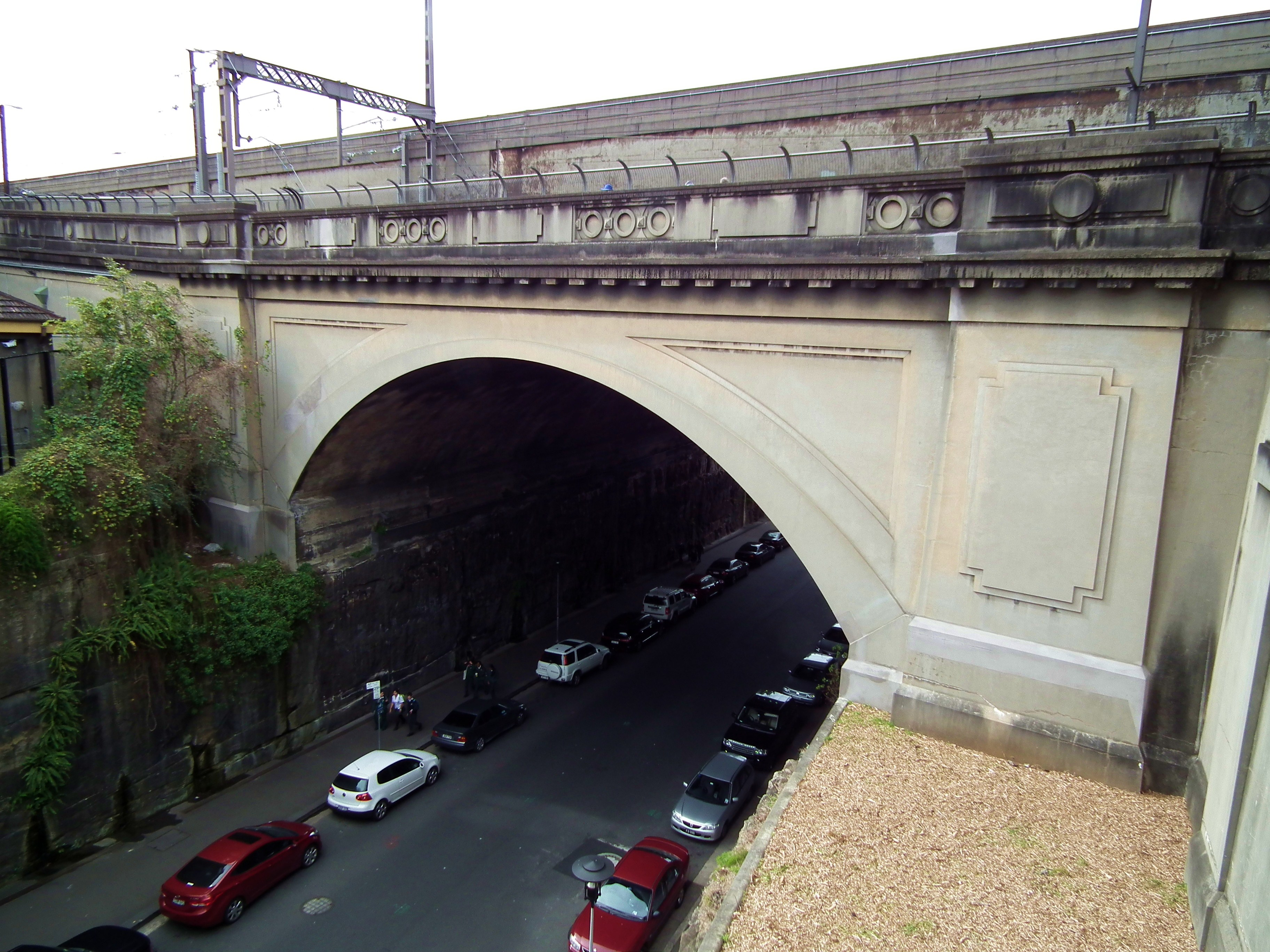
- Argyle Bridge, The Rocks
- Coordinates: 33°51′32″S 151°12′26″E
- Carries: Cumberland Street
- Crosses: Argyle Street; Argyle Cut
- Locale: The Rocks, City of Sydney, New South Wales, Australia
- Owner: Property NSW

History
- Construction start: 1911
- Construction end: 1912

New South Wales Heritage Register
- Official name: Argyle Bridge; Includes Argyle Stairs
- Type: State heritage (built)
- Designated: 10 May 2002
- Reference no.: 1522
- Type: Road Bridge
- Category: Transport – Land

Location
- Interactive map of Argyle Bridge

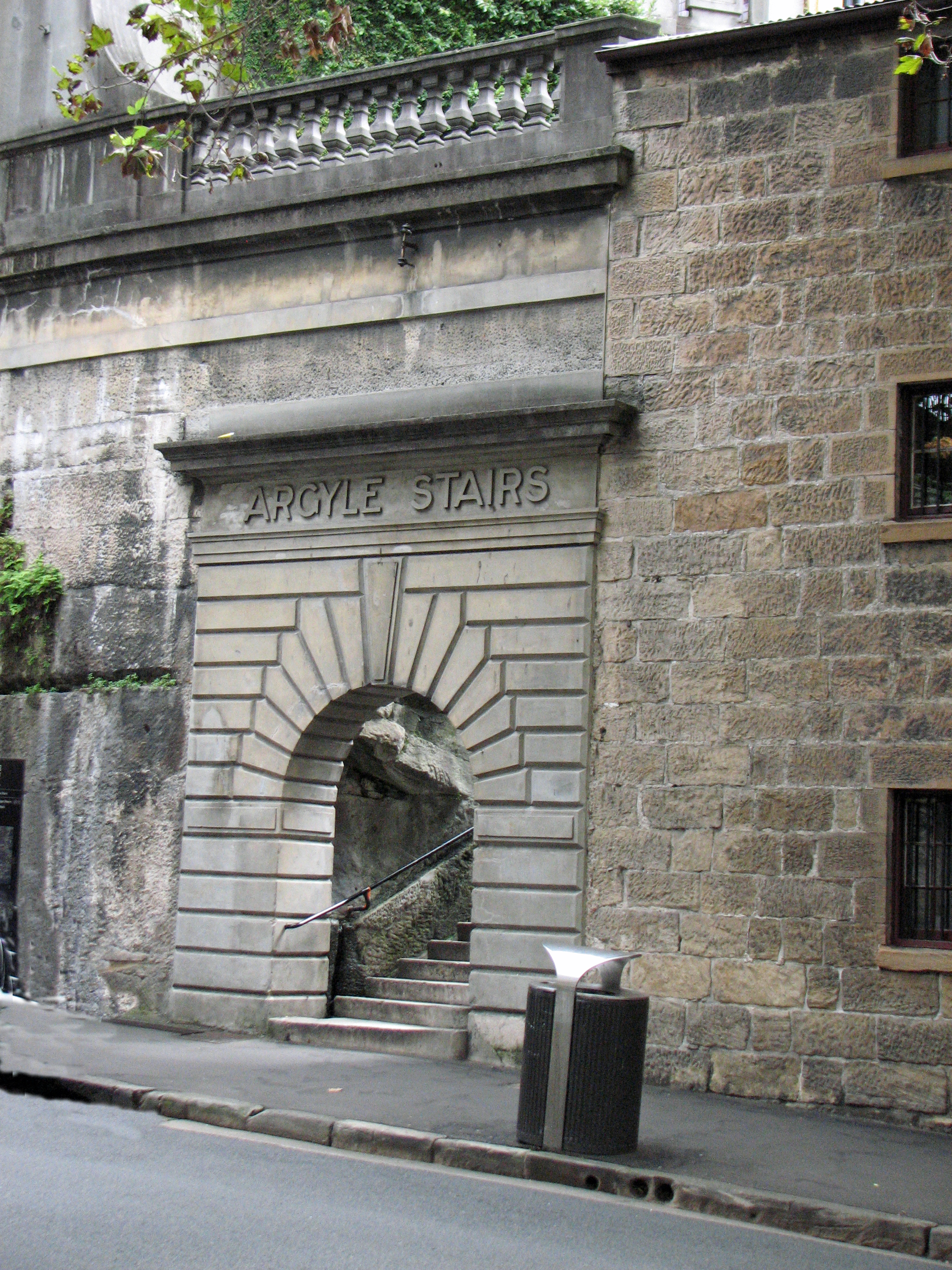
Argyle stairs, from Argyle Cut

The Argyle Bridge is a heritage-listed road bridge that carries Cumberland Street across the Argyle Cut and Argyle Street in the inner-city Sydney suburb of The Rocks in the City of Sydney local government area of New South Wales, Australia. It was built from 1911 to 1912. It is also known to include the Argyle Stairs. The property is owned by the Property NSW, an agency of the Government of New South Wales. It was added to the New South Wales State Heritage Register on 10 May 2002.

== History ==
The original Argyle Bridges were built for Gloucester Street in 1862, Cumberland Street in 1864 and Princes Street in 1867–68. The Princes Street Bridge was demolished as part of the Sydney Harbour Bridge construction. The inscription from the Princes Street Bridge identifying Charles Moore is now relocated on the Argyle Cut's south wall.

As part of the Sydney Harbour Trust's improvements, Gloucester and Cumberland Streets were realigned, and the two road bridges over the Argyle Cut replaced by a single bridge at Cumberland Street in 1911–12. Cumberland Street had previously been located to the west of its current location. The Cumberland Street bridge replaced the lower Gloucester Street Bridge and the higher Cumberland Street Bridge over the Argyle Cut. The work also involved the demolition of 22–24 Gloucester Street, part of View Terrace (now 26–30 Gloucester Street), and construction of the abutments to the bridge and the Argyle Stairs. The parapet of the part of the bridge directly over Argyle Street was replaced in the 1950s.

== Description ==
The site includes the 1911 road bridge at Cumberland Street, abutments to the bridge with small obelisk-shaped pylons on either side of the road (at the north and south approaches to the bridge), and intact original light fittings. The parapet of the part of the bridge directly over Argyle Street was replaced in the 1950s. The original parapet of the bridge can still be seen to the south of the southern abutments. In 2008 structural cracks and areas of concrete cancer were detected and remedial works carried out to repair the damage.

=== Condition ===
As at 4 February 2009, in 2008 remedial works were carried out on the bridge to repair structural cracks and areas of concrete cancer. At the same time the Bridge was thoroughly inspected for any other damage and necessary repairs undertaken. The parapet of the part of the bridge directly over Argyle Street was replaced in the 1950s. The original parapet can still be seen to the south of the southern abutments. In 2008 inspection and repairs were carried out.

=== Modifications and dates ===
- 1950s – Bridge parapet replaced.
- 2008 – Concrete cancer and structural cracks found in the bridge so extensive remedial works carried out.

== Heritage listing ==
As of 30 March 2011, the Argyle Bridge and site are of State heritage significance for their historical and scientific cultural values. The site and building are also of State heritage significance for their contribution to The Rocks area, which is of State Heritage significance in its own right. The Argyle Bridge has research potential for its association with town planning, street and urban development in early Sydney, and the ongoing development of transportation systems in The Rocks. The Argyle Bridge is of historical significance as evidence of the town planning initiatives and urban improvements of the Sydney Harbour Trust in the early 1900s and the changes to the road pattern and surrounds involved in the Sydney Harbour construction Bridge in the 1920s-30s. The Argyle Bridge at Cumberland Street is held in high esteem by the residents and visitors to Sydney, and contributes strongly to The Rocks' character.

Argyle Bridge was listed on the New South Wales State Heritage Register on 10 May 2002 having satisfied the following criteria.

The place is important in demonstrating the course, or pattern, of cultural or natural history in New South Wales.

The Argyle Bridge is of historical significance as evidence of the town planning initiatives to improve the provision of access and infrastructure, including the urban improvements of the Sydney Harbour Trust in the early 1900s and the changes to the road pattern and surrounds involved in the construction of the Sydney Harbour Bridge in the 1920s-30s.

The place has a strong or special association with a particular community or cultural group in New South Wales for social, cultural or spiritual reasons.

The Argyle Bridge has social significance as part of the Rocks Conservation area. The Argyle Bridge at Cumberland Street is held in high esteem by the residents and visitors to Sydney, and contributes strongly to The Rocks' character.

The place has potential to yield information that will contribute to an understanding of the cultural or natural history of New South Wales.

The Argyle Bridge has research potential for its association with town planning, street and urban development in early Sydney, and the ongoing development of transportation systems in The Rocks

== See also ==
- List of bridges in Sydney
