= 18–20a Munn Street, Millers Point =

18–20a Munn Street
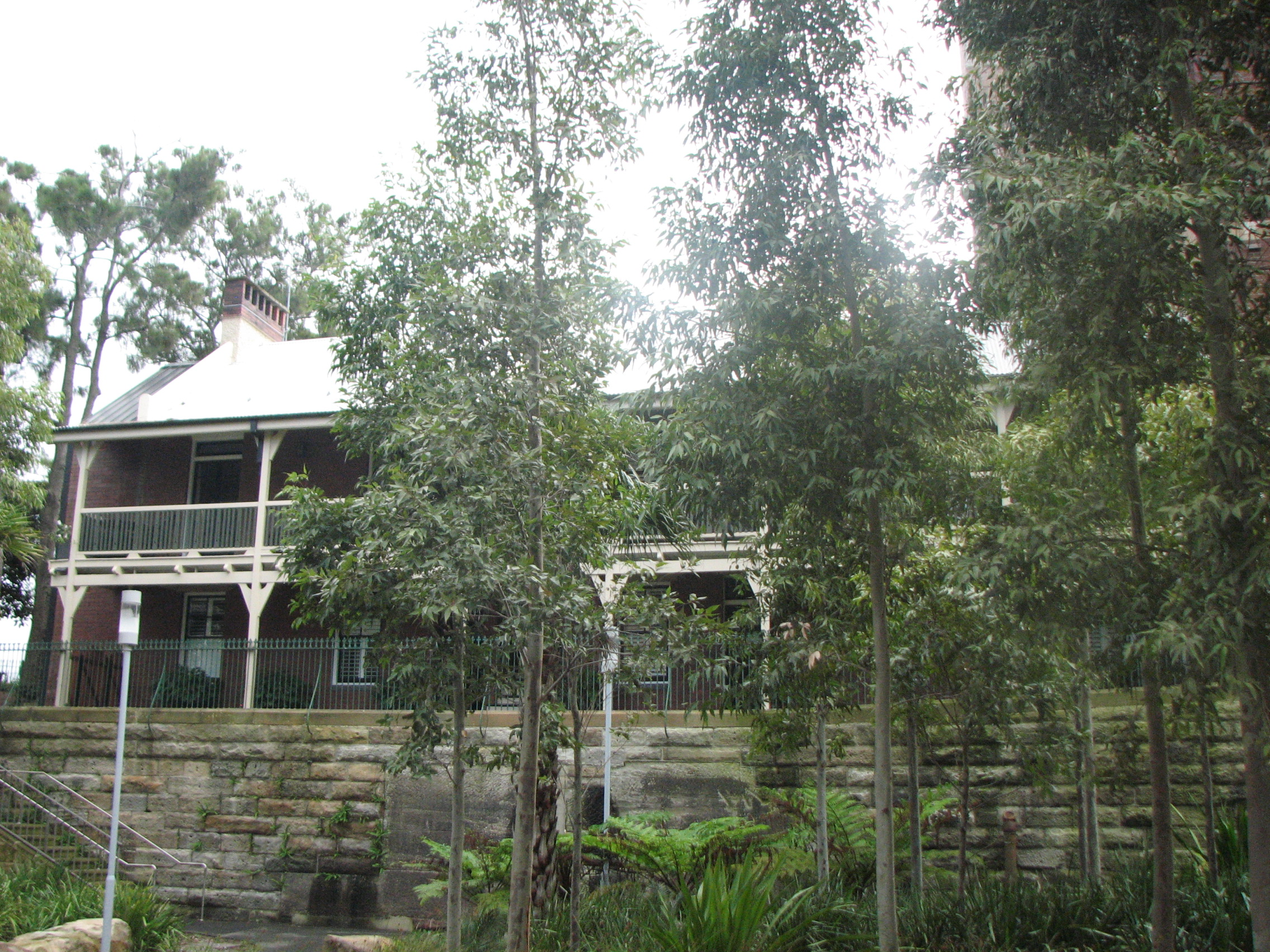
- 18–20a Munn Street, Millers Point

- Location within Sydney Location within Australia
- 33.8580°S 151.2020°E
- Location: 18, 18a, 20, 20a Munn Street, Millers Point, City of Sydney, New South Wales, Australia

History
- Built: c. 1911

Site notes
- Architectural style: Federation

New South Wales Heritage Register
- Official name: Terrace
- Type: State heritage (built)
- Designated: 2 April 1999
- Reference no.: 912
- Type: Terrace
- Category: Residential buildings (private)

New South Wales Heritage Database (Local Government Register)
- Official name: Terrace Group Including Interiors
- Type: Built
- Designated: 14 December 2012
- Reference no.: I932

18–20a Munn Street is a heritage-listed row of terrace houses located at 18, 18a, 20, 20a Munn Street, in the inner city Sydney suburb of Millers Point in the City of Sydney local government area of New South Wales, Australia. It was added to the New South Wales State Heritage Register on 2 April 1999.

== History ==
Millers Point is one of the earliest areas of European settlement in Australia, and a focus for maritime activities. This Federation style terrace is one of two remaining terraces of an original group of six built c. 1911, the others having been demolished for the port expansion at Darling Harbour. It was first tenanted by the NSW Department of Housing in 1986.

== Description ==
A group of four houses (upper and ground level dwellings), well-integrated with the Palisade Hotel site. Main entrances to the south are accessible from a shared verandah walkway. Side yards are located on Bettington Street. Art nouveau fretwork and cast iron fencing are particularly noteworthy.

The terraces are of face brick with sandstone trim to doors and windows (four pane), and with a two-storey verandah with timber balustrading.

== Heritage listing ==
This group of early twentieth century terrace houses was previously larger, some being demolished for Darling Harbour Port expansion.

It is part of the Millers Point Conservation Area, an intact residential and maritime precinct. It contains residential buildings and civic spaces dating from the 1830s and is an important example of nineteenth-century adaptation of the landscape.

18–20a Munn Street was listed on the New South Wales State Heritage Register on 2 April 1999.

== See also ==
- Australian residential architectural styles
