= Alfred's Terrace =

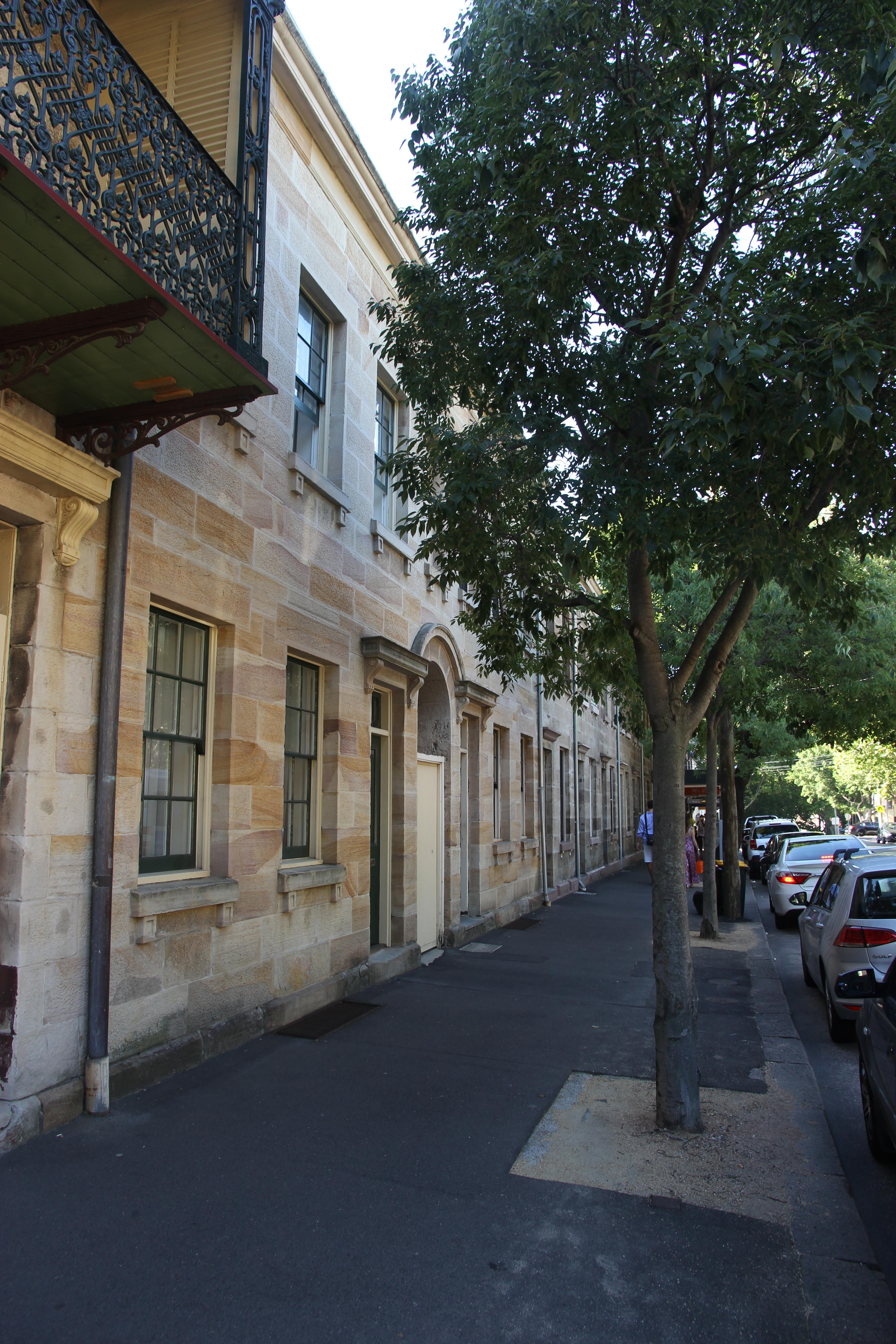
- Alfred's Terrace, pictured in 2019

- Location within Sydney Location within Australia
- 33.8590°S 151.2034°E
- Location: 37, 39, 41, 43, 45, 47 Kent Street, Millers Point, City of Sydney, New South Wales, Australia

History
- Built: c. 1860s

Site notes
- Architectural style: Victorian Georgian

New South Wales Heritage Register
- Official name: Alfred's Terrace
- Type: State heritage (built)
- Designated: 2 April 1999
- Reference no.: 837
- Type: Terrace
- Category: Residential buildings (private)

Alfred's Terrace is a heritage-listed row of terrace houses located at 37–47 Kent Street, in the inner city Sydney suburb of Millers Point in the City of Sydney local government area of New South Wales, Australia. The property was added to the New South Wales State Heritage Register on 2 April 1999.

== History ==
Millers Point is one of the earliest areas of European settlement in Australia, and a focus for maritime activities. This site was vacant in 1862 and these six terraces were constructed before 1865. They remain largely intact. First tenanted by the NSW Department of Housing in 1986.

== Description ==
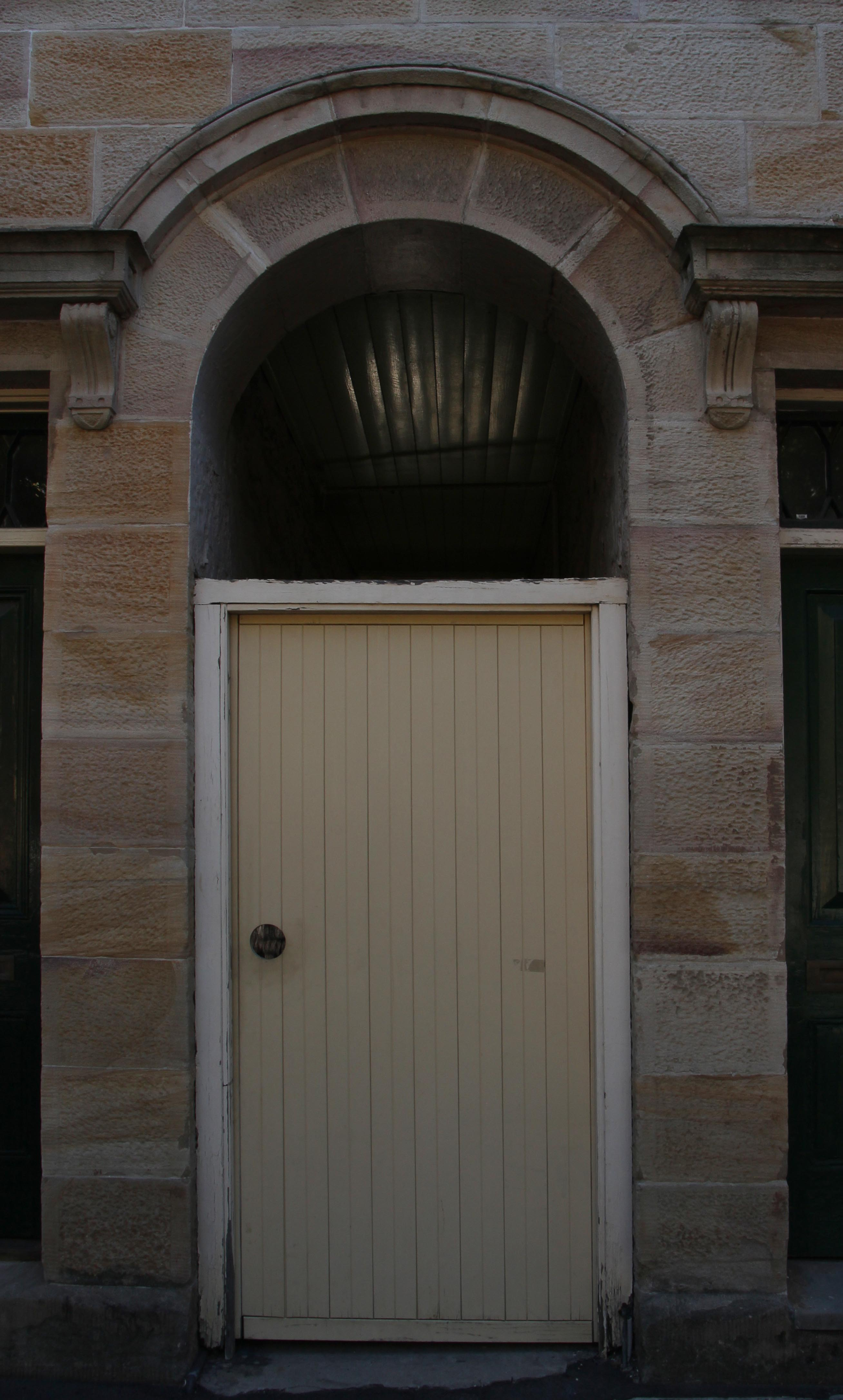

Georgian style mid-Victorian face sandstone terrace in good condition. Also, the terraces feature slate roofs, basements, a projecting parapet cornice and twelve pane windows. This residence has three bedrooms. Storeys: Two; Construction: Face stone walls painted, rendered masonry parapet string course. Slate roof, painted brick chimney. Painted timber roof. Style: Victorian Georgian

Constructed c. 1865, the subject site contains six two-storey (three level including basement/lower ground level) Georgian style mid-Victorian terraces with baldface sandstone facades, consisting of a fine sparrow pecked and margined stone finish and slate roof concealed behind the painted parapet.

The principal facades of the six terraces are identical and are unpainted sandstone, each with a projecting mould and parapet cornice. A sandstone projection mould is located above each of the rectangular fanlights above the four panelled timber door of each terrace. Each terrace comprises two windows to the first floor and the front door and one window to the ground floor in a repetitive configuration. All windows are double hung with six panes per sash and have projecting sills supported by brackets. Rainwater heads and downpipes are also located at even spacing every second terrace servicing the shared box gutter behind the parapet.

The rear elevation of each terrace on the subject site is constructed of painted sandstone to the lower ground level and painted brickwork to the ground and first floor. The rear elevation consists of a single window to the lower ground floor, ground and first floor. All the windows on each terrace are painted timber, double hung and include projecting sandstone sills. Most windows are reproduction 1980s. Each terrace includes a late 1980s / early 1990s weatherboard wing to the lower ground floor with a barrel vaulted roof in corrugated iron. Each wing features double hung windows to the access pathway and one to the rear. The party walls to the north and south are shared with adjoining terraces. Number 47, the southernmost terrace in the group, shares a south party wall with number 49, which is part of a separate terrace group 49–51 Kent Street. The Captain Cook Hotel is constructed butting up to 37 Kent Street at the north. The rear of each property has a small yard and fence to the rear lane (High Street) with pedestrian access. The site area of each is similar and approximately 100 square metres (1,100 sq ft).

The external condition of the property is good.

== Heritage listing ==
As at 6 December 2000, this is a group of six two-storey Georgian style, mid Victorian face sandstone terraces, in mostly intact condition.

It is part of the Millers Point Conservation Area, an intact residential and maritime precinct. It contains residential buildings and civic spaces dating from the 1830s and is an important example of C19th adaptation of the landscape.

Alfred's Terrace (37–47 Kent Street) has significance at the state level for its historic, aesthetic and representative values and at the local level for its associative and social values and for its research potential. The terraces and components are of individual significance and also contribute to the significance of the group as a collective row.

The subject site has historic, aesthetic and representative significance as a fine and relatively intact example of a row of mid Victorian Georgian style terraces with a sandstone facade constructed c. 1865. The place is a significant streetscape element, its scale and design demonstrates the early development of Kent Street as a residential neighbourhood in the mid to late nineteenth century that occurred alongside the growth of the maritime industry at Millers Point. The design of the terrace is typical within Millers Point as it responds to the stepping sandstone topography of the peninsula with its principal frontage to Kent Street and sub level basement stepping down to High Lane at the rear.

It is part of the state heritage significant Millers Point Conservation Area, which is a rare and intact residential and maritime precinct. It contains residential buildings and civic spaces dating from the 1830s and is an important example of c19th century adaptation of the landscape for maritime activities.

Alfred's Terrace has associative significance for its association with prominent Sydney residents George Wigram Allen (prominent solicitor, politician, and philanthropist) and W. P. Manning (four times Mayor of Sydney and member of the Legislative Assembly).

Millers Point and the subject site has social significance as a former working class maritime neighbourhood from around 1900, to the immediate post war years (1950s) and for the provision of social housing by the Department of Housing from the 1980s. The later 1980s period reflects the ongoing provision of low cost accommodation but was increasingly introducing new residents with no local or familial connections to the area which had already been declining from the 1950s.

There is medium to high potential for the terraces to contain under floor and rear yard archaeological deposits. Archaeological deposits in the rear yards are likely to be largely intact

Alfred's Terrace was listed on the New South Wales State Heritage Register on 2 April 1999 having satisfied the following criteria.

The place is important in demonstrating the course, or pattern, of cultural or natural history in New South Wales.

The subject site has historical significance at a local and state level as a representative row of Georgian style, mid Victorian terraces constructed c. 1865, commissioned by prominent solicitor George Wigram Allen. The erection of the terrace row reflects the significant development of the area to house the local maritime workforce.

The place has a strong or special association with a person, or group of persons, of importance of cultural or natural history of New South Wales's history.

The subject site has associative significance at a local level for its association with George Wigram Allen, a prominent solicitor, politician, and philanthropist who commissioned the construction of the terraces. The terrace is also of significance for its association with subsequent owner, W. P. Manning Chairman of the Australian Bank of Commerce and four times Mayor of Sydney and a member of the Legislative Assembly.

The place is important in demonstrating aesthetic characteristics and/or a high degree of creative or technical achievement in New South Wales.

The subject terrace row has aesthetic significance at the local and state level as a fine example of a Georgian style mid Victorian terrace row which is characteristic of the local area. The group retains its principal façades and overall form albeit with some sympathetic replacement of joinery which is not detrimental to significance. The design of the terrace row is typical within Millers Point as it responds to the stepping sandstone topography of the peninsula with its principal frontage to Kent Street and sub level basement stepping down to High Lane at the rear. The terraces and components are of individual significance and also contribute to the significance of the group as a collective row.

The place has a strong or special association with a particular community or cultural group in New South Wales for social, cultural or spiritual reasons.

The Millers Point residential precinct is one of the oldest residential precincts in the country and has a long and varied history of European settlement and occupants. Millers Point's earliest European occupants from c. 1834 were a mixture of its waterside workforce and merchants, politicians, businessmen and professionals. Post the resumptions of the Darling Harbour Wharves Resumption Act in 1900 many of the properties in Millers Point were at some stage utilized as boarding houses, however documentary and physical evidence suggests the subject terraces remained single occupancy dwellings as per their original use.

Progressively from 1983 to 1986 management was transferred to the NSW Department of Housing and the occupation of previous tenants with their link to maritime uses decreased.

Millers Point and the subject site has social significance as a former working class maritime neighbourhood from around 1900 to the immediate post war years (1950s). The use of Millers Point for the provision of social housing by the DoH from the 1980s reflected the ongoing provision of low cost accommodation but increasingly introduced new residents with no local or familial connections to the area. New occupancy in Millers Point was thus increasing the disconnection from the local areas long term tenants and maritime workers housing and association with the Walsh Bay wharfs which had already been declining from the 1950s.

The place has potential to yield information that will contribute to an understanding of the cultural or natural history of New South Wales.

The group has research potential at a local level. Based on the results of previous archaeological investigations in the area over the past 20 years and the development of the subject site, there is medium to high potential for the terraces to contain under floor and rear yard archaeological deposits. Under floor deposits may be disturbed by previous works such as re-flooring and new rear wings. The archaeological deposits in the rear yards are likely to be largely intact.

The place possesses uncommon, rare or endangered aspects of the cultural or natural history of New South Wales.

The subject site is a representative row of Georgian style, mid Victorian terraces constructed c. 1865, which is represented throughout the Millers Point and The Rocks and the City of Sydney local government area more broadly (e.g. Darlinghurst).

The place is important in demonstrating the principal characteristics of a class of cultural or natural places/environments in New South Wales.

The terrace group has representative significance at a local and state level as a characteristic mid to late Victorian Georgian style terrace row of high integrity. The terraces and components are of individual significance and also contribute to the representative significance of the group as a collective row.

== See also ==
- Australian residential architectural styles
- Captain Cook Hotel: 35 Kent Street
- 49–51 Kent Street
