= 49–51 Kent Street, Millers Point =

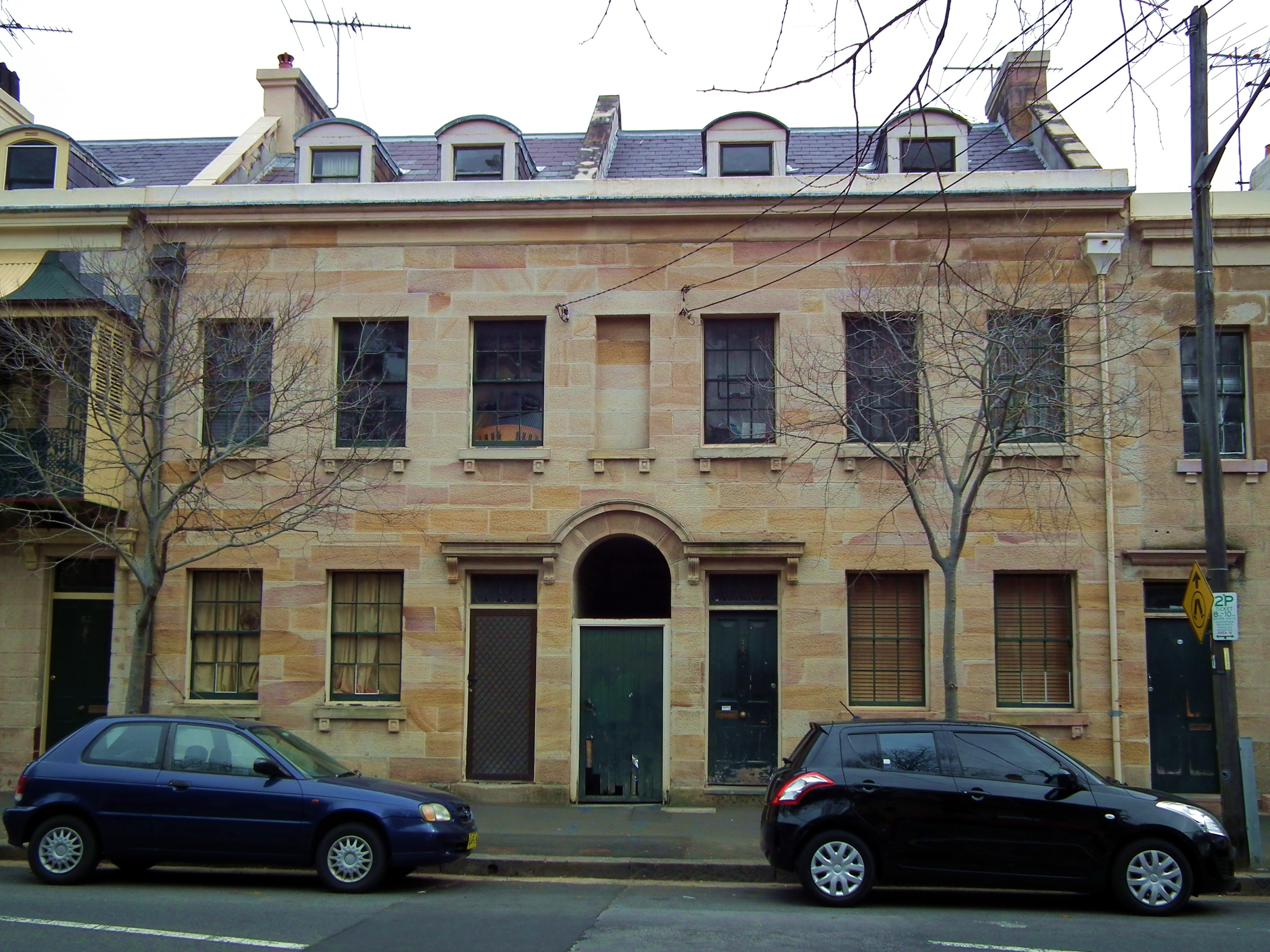
- 49–51 Kent Street, pictured in 2012

- Location within Sydney Location within Australia
- 33.8592°S 151.2034°E
- Location: 49, 51 Kent Street, Millers Point, City of Sydney, New South Wales, Australia

History
- Built: 1855–1862

Site notes
- Architectural style: Victorian Georgian

New South Wales Heritage Register
- Official name: Stone House
- Type: State heritage (built)
- Designated: 2 April 1999
- Reference no.: 876
- Type: historic site

49–51 Kent Street, Millers Point is a heritage-listed residence located at 49–51 Kent Street, in the inner city Sydney suburb of Millers Point in the City of Sydney local government area of New South Wales, Australia. It was built from 1855 to 1862. The property was added to the New South Wales State Heritage Register on 2 April 1999.

== History ==
Millers Point is one of the earliest areas of European settlement in Australia, and a focus for maritime activities. This site was vacant in 1854 and these terraces were shown on a map c. 1862. They remain largely intact.

== Description ==
Georgian style mid-Victorian face sandstone terrace in good condition. This residence has five bedrooms. Features of the terrace include attics with dormers, an arched passageway between dwellings, stone parapets and 12 pane windows. Storeys: Two; Construction: Face stone walls painted, rendered masonry parapet string course. Slate roof, painted brick chimney. Painted timber roof. Style: Victorian Georgian.

The external condition of the building is good.

== Heritage listing ==
As at 20 August 2015, this residence is one of a two large mid Victorian, face sandstone terraces in mostly intact condition.

It is part of the Millers Point Conservation Area, an intact residential and maritime precinct. It contains residential buildings and civic spaces dating from the 1830s and is an important example of C19th adaptation of the landscape.

49–51 Kent Street, Millers Point was listed on the New South Wales State Heritage Register on 2 April 1999.

== See also ==
- Alfred's Terrace: 37–47 Kent Street
- 53–55 Kent Street
