= Argyle Cut =

Historic road in Sydney, New South Wales, Australia

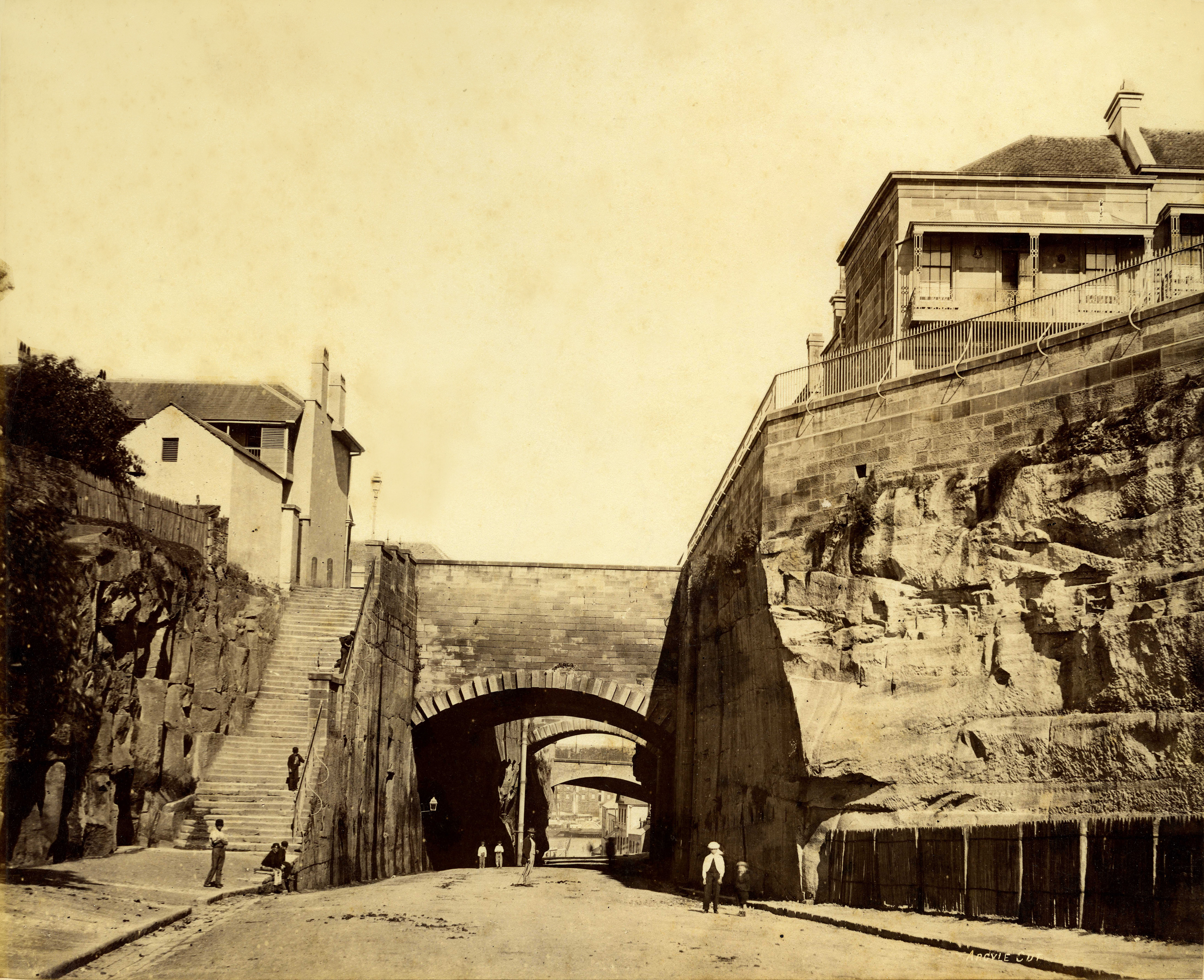
- An c. 1870s albumen photoprint of the Argyle Cut, looking west.

- Location within Sydney Location within Australia
- 33.8588°S 151.2066°E
- Location: Argyle Street, The Rocks, City of Sydney, New South Wales, Australia

History
- Built: 1843–1868

Site notes
- Owner: Sydney Harbour Foreshore Authority

New South Wales Heritage Register
- Official name: Argyle Cut
- Type: state heritage (built)
- Designated: 10 May 2002
- Reference no.: 1523
- Type: Road Embankment/Cutting
- Category: Transport – Land
- Builders: Convict and paid labour

The Argyle Cut is a heritage-listed roadway and road cutting located at Argyle Street in the inner-city Sydney suburb of The Rocks in the City of Sydney local government area of New South Wales, Australia. It was built from 1843 to 1868 with convict and paid labour. The property is owned by the Sydney Harbour Foreshore Authority, an agency of the Government of New South Wales. It was added to the New South Wales State Heritage Register on 10 May 2002.

== History ==
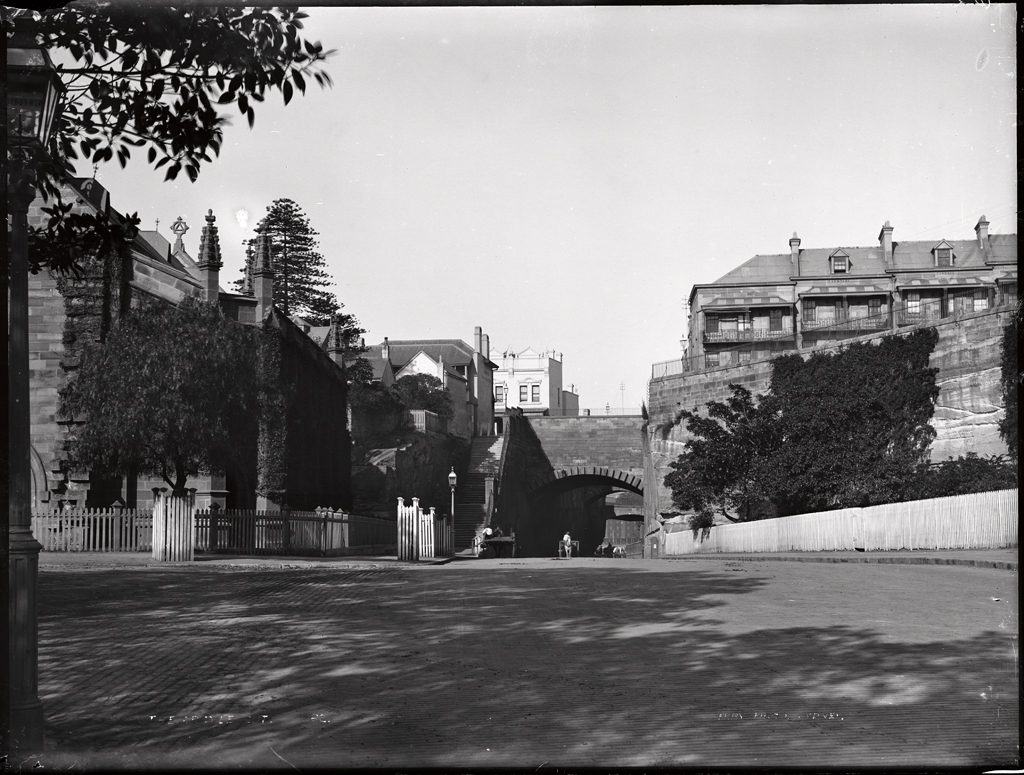
The Argyle Cut, looking east, pictured in c. 1900.

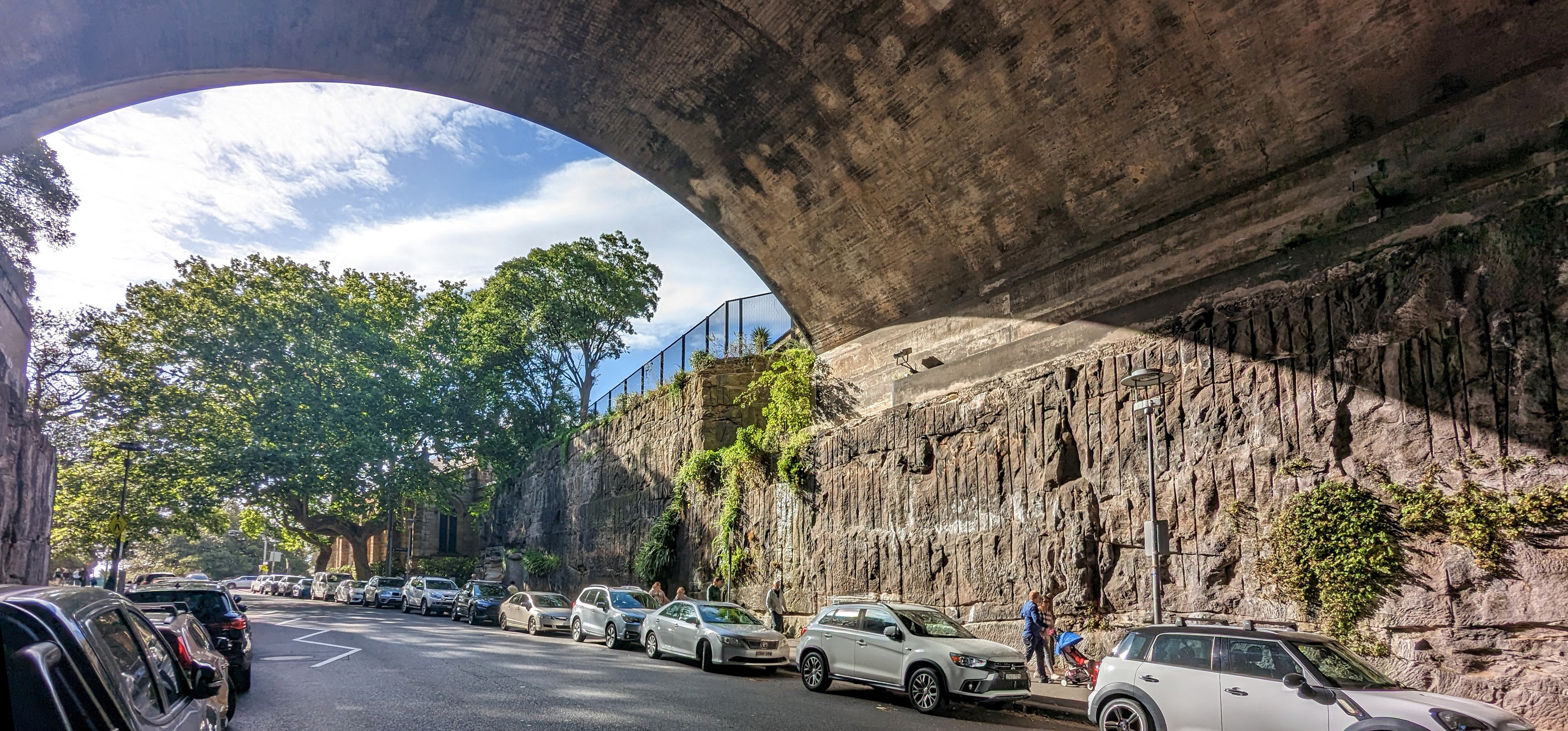
Looking west through the Argyle Cut, below the Sydney Harbour Bridge approach, in 2022

Agitation for a link between The Rocks and Millers Point began early; the Sydney Gazette in 1803 lamented the lack of a short cut across the rocky peninsula. Maclehouse, in the Picture of Sydney and Strangers Guide in NSW for 1839, an early tourist guide, says that Argyle Street was in two parts. The eastern from George Street to Harrington Street separated by the western side by a "precipice of considerable height". At that stage a set of stairs which had once been cut into the rock to provide access between the two halves was already deteriorated and unsafe. Before the cut was built, the only way that vehicles could get from the Sydney Cove to Darling Harbour was via a circuitous route along lower George Street, to Dawes Point and into Windmill Street. For pedestrians, there was no other way except along the steep alleyways and flights of crude steps.

As Darling Harbour developed, it became crucial for a link between the Cove and Millers Point. The first schemes came from private enterprise, with an ambitious plan to cut a deep channel through the central spine of The Rocks. The father of this plan was Alexander Berry, one of the wealthiest landowners and merchants in the colony. He had already presided over cutting a channel between the river and an arm of Crookhaven which became the virtual mouth of the Shoalhaven River. Besides his large landholding in the Shoalhaven, Berry had vast commercial interests in Sydney as an importer and exporter. His office was in Lower George Street, and he was vitally concerned about plans to extend Argyle Street. The proposal was that the shareholders should have the right to levy tolls on all passengers and stock using the cut, and from the revenue, the shareholders were to get a dividend. Any excess was to accumulate until it equalled the amount expended initially in the making of the cut. The capital was then to be returned to the shareholders, and the toll would cease. Governor Bourke and the Legislative Council turned down the plan, and the Government decided to undertake the work.

A plan for the Argyle Cut was drawn up by the Government Architect, Edward Hallen, in 1832. The plan shows the proposed bridges over the streets above, a view, and the road's inclination.

The Argyle Cut was begun by 1843, with convict labour in chain gangs. Their overseer was a cruel man, Tim Lane, who used to declare to the labourers that 'by the help of God and the strong arm of the flogger, you'll get fifty before breakfast tomorrow!' Despite his efforts, the job proved beyond the crude tools of the convicts. Transportation to NSW had ceased in 1840 after much agitation, and many of the residents were unsettled by the sight and sounds of convicts labouring in chains in full view. The Government abandoned the project when it was half completed.

The cut was eventually completed by Sydney Municipal Council, using explosives and council labour in 1859. The spoil was used to fill the mouth of the Tank Stream and to buttress the sea wall at Circular Quay. Overhead bridges were built for Gloucester Street in 1862, Cumberland Street in 1864 and the Princes Street in 1867–68 (the latter demolished as part of the Sydney Harbour Bridge construction). There is an inscription identifying Charles Moore, Mayor (1867–68) from this Bridge now relocated to the south wall of the cut. With the building of new wharves at Walsh Bay and the laying out of Hickson Road the Cut lost much of its importance.

As part of the Sydney Harbour Trust's improvements in 1911-12, Gloucester and Cumberland Streets were realigned, and the two road bridges over the Argyle Cut replaced by a single bridge at Cumberland Street and the Argyle Stairs were constructed. This work involved the demolition of 22–24 Gloucester Street, part of View Terrace.

Later, as part of the building of the Bradfield Highway in the 1920s, the Princes Street Bridge was demolished, and the Argyle Cut was widened at the Princes Street end, and the Bradfield Highway was constructed overhead, completed in 1932.

== Description ==
The Argyle Cut is a deep rock cutting giving a direct connection between Millers Point and The Rocks. It is covered by two bridges, the Cumberland Street bridge of c. 1911 and the Bradfield Highway c. 1930. On the wall of the Argyle Cut is an inscription that refers to the completion of the overhead bridges: completed 1867-1868, by Sydney Municipal Council, Charles Moore, mayor.

=== Condition ===
As at 22 March 2004, the archaeological assessment of the cut was assessed as partly disturbed.

=== Modifications and dates ===
The Cut was begun by 1843, and completed in 1859. Overhead bridges were built for Gloucester Street in 1862, Cumberland Street in 1864 and Princes Street in 1867–68. In 1911–12 Gloucester and Cumberland Streets were realigned and the two bridges replaced by a single bridge at Cumberland Street at the same time the Argyle Stairs were built. In the 1920s the Bradfield Highway was constructed, involving the demolition of the Princes Street bridge, widening the Cut at that end and the construction of a much larger bridge to accommodate the traffic from the Sydney Harbour Bridge.

== Heritage listing ==
As at 30 March 2011, Argyle Cut is of State heritage significance for its historical and scientific cultural values. The site is also of State heritage significance for its contribution to The Rocks area which is of State Heritage significance in its own right. The Argyle Cut has significance in that it is identified with the changing labour market in Sydney. It has associations with convict labour and the acceptance of responsibility of urban growth and public works by the Sydney Council. Argyle Cut has historical significance as an early east-west route across The Rocks, as an imposing example of convict public works, and as evidence, in its ongoing changes, crossings and widening, of improvements in the provision of access and infrastructure, including the work of the Sydney Harbour Trust and that for the construction of the Sydney Harbour Bridge and its approaches. It has aesthetic significance with the deep cutting providing a dramatic feature in Argyle Street.

It has been ranked along with Busby's Bore and the building of Circular Quay as one of the most impressive engineering feats in early Sydney. The Argyle Cut has social significance as an important feature in The Rocks conservation area, and contributes strongly to the character of The Rocks. The Argyle cut is held in high esteem as indicated by its listings on the National Trust register and the Register of the National Estate, and thus is recognised by an identifiable group and has importance to the broader community.

The Argyle Cut has significance from the links it derives with and support function associated with the development of a society in which it has sat for more than 150 years. The Argyle Cut has research potential for its association with town planning and street and urban development in early Sydney, and with the ongoing development of transportation systems within the city. The Argyle Cut is a rare example of early responses to the geographical difficulties presented to urban growth. The large spine of rock which cut the area into two was a barrier to the ease of transportation between two important and growing maritime and mercantile precincts.

Argyle Cut was listed on the New South Wales State Heritage Register on 10 May 2002 having satisfied the following criteria.

The place is important in demonstrating the course, or pattern, of cultural or natural history in New South Wales.

Argyle Cut has historical significance as an early east-west route across The Rocks, as an imposing example of convict public works, and as evidence, in its ongoing changes, crossings and widenings, of improvements in the provision of access and infrastructure, including the work of the Sydney Harbour Trust and that for the construction of the Sydney Harbour Bridge and its approaches. It has aesthetic significance with the deep cutting providing a dramatic feature in Argyle Street. It has been ranked along with Busby's Bore and the building of Circular Quay as one of the most impressive engineering feats in early Sydney.

The place has a strong or special association with a person, or group of persons, of importance of cultural or natural history of New South Wales's history.

The Argyle Cut has significance in that it is identified with the changing labour market in Sydney. It has associations with convict labour and the acceptance of responsibility of urban growth and public works by the Sydney Council

The place is important in demonstrating aesthetic characteristics and/or a high degree of creative or technical achievement in New South Wales.

It has been ranked along with Busby's Bore and the building of Circular Quay as one of the most impressive engineering feats in early Sydney.

The place has a strong or special association with a particular community or cultural group in New South Wales for social, cultural or spiritual reasons.

The Argyle Cut has social significance as an important feature in The Rocks conservation area, and contributes strongly to the character of The Rocks. The Argyle cut is held in high esteem as indicated by its listings on the National Trust register and the Register of the National estate, and thus is recognised by an identifiable group and has importance to the broader community. The Argyle Cut has significance from the links it derives with and support function associated with the development of a society in which it has sat for more than 150 years.

The place has potential to yield information that will contribute to an understanding of the cultural or natural history of New South Wales.

The Argyle Cut has research potential for its association with town planning and street and urban development in early Sydney, and with the ongoing development of transportation systems within the city.

The place possesses uncommon, rare or endangered aspects of the cultural or natural history of New South Wales.

The Argyle Cut is a rare example of early responses to the geographical difficulties presented to urban growth. The large spine of rock which cut the area into two was a barrier to the ease of transportation between two important and growing maritime and mercantile precincts.

== See also ==
- Argyle Bridge
