= 53–55 Kent Street, Millers Point =

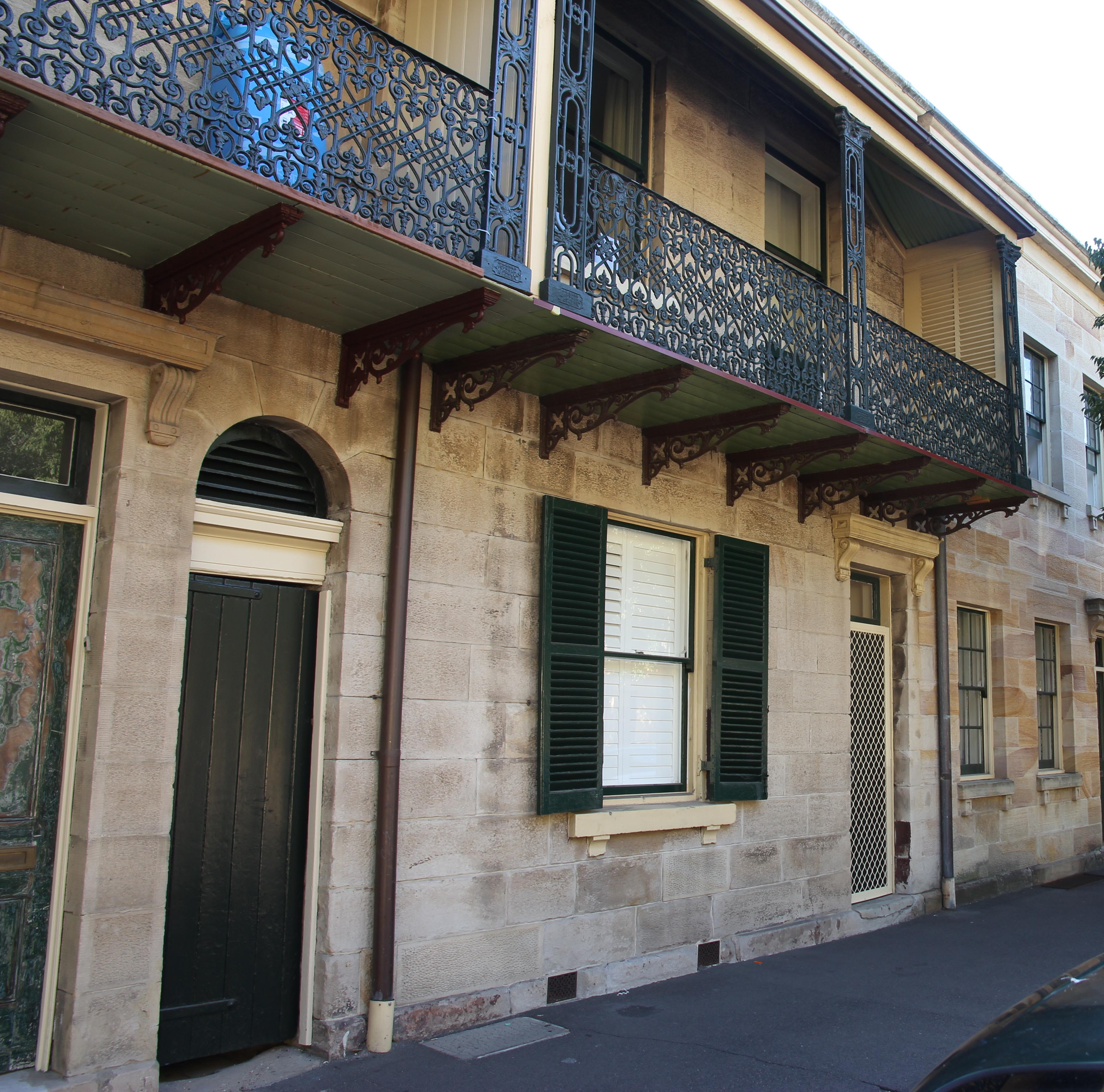
- 53–55 Kent Street, pictured in 2019.

- Location within Sydney Location within Australia
- 33.8593°S 151.2034°E
- Location: 53, 55 Kent Street, Millers Point, City of Sydney, New South Wales, Australia

History
- Built: 1862–1865

Site notes
- Architectural style: Victorian Georgian

New South Wales Heritage Register
- Official name: Stone House
- Type: State heritage (built)
- Designated: 2 April 1999
- Reference no.: 900
- Type: Historic site

53–55 Kent Street, Millers Point are heritage-listed terrace houses located at 53–55 Kent Street, in the inner city Sydney suburb of Millers Point in the City of Sydney local government area of New South Wales, Australia. The property was added to the New South Wales State Heritage Register on 2 April 1999.

== History ==
Millers Point is one of the earliest areas of European settlement in Australia, and a focus for maritime activities. This sandstone faced terrace was constructed between 1862 and 1865 and has recently been restored to original condition. The fund year for redevelopment was 1993/94.

== Description ==
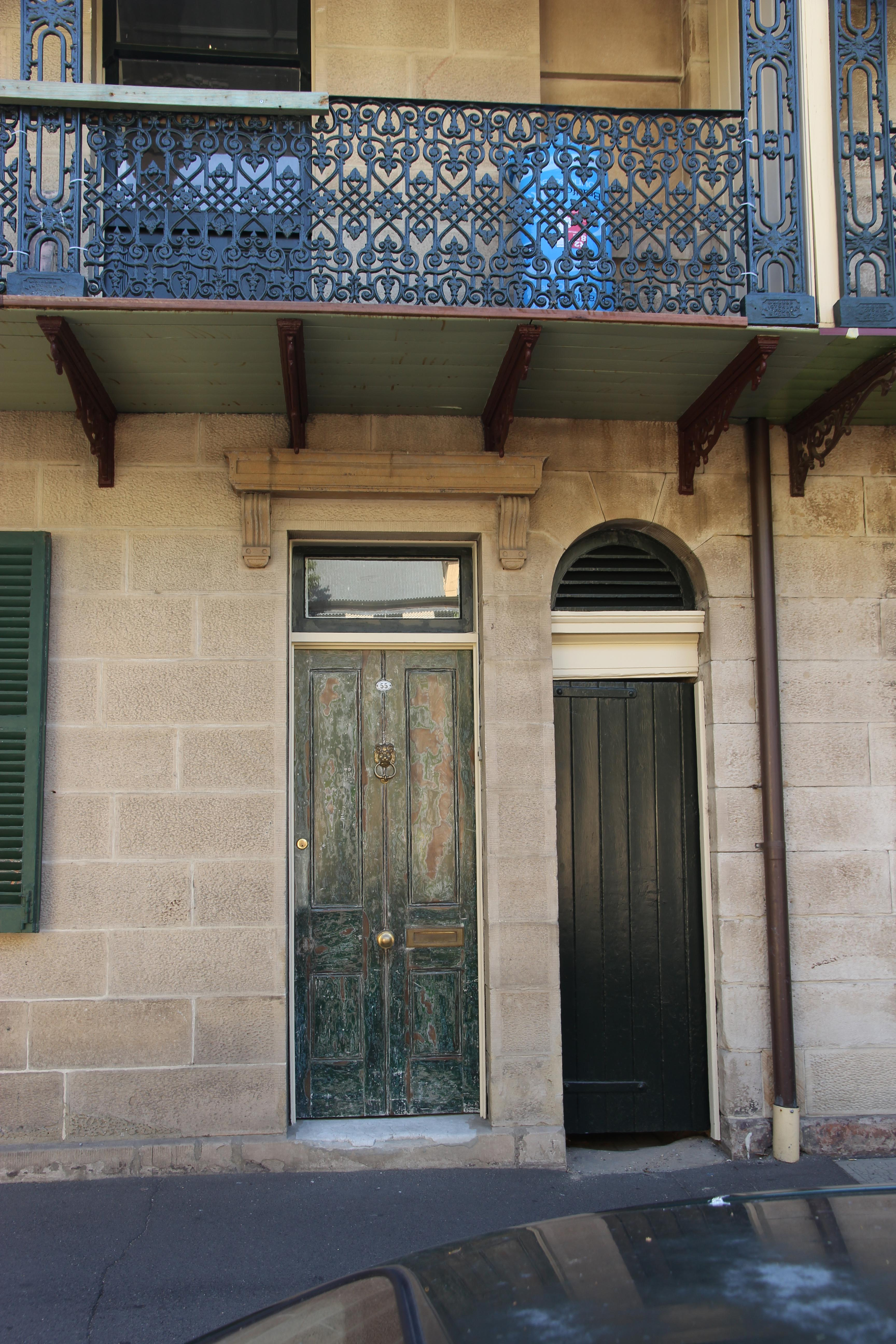
A doorway at 53 Kent Street, pictured in 2019.

One of a pair of mid Victorian face sandstone terraces with top balconies cantilevered over the footpaths. This residence has three bedrooms. Storeys: Two; Construction: Face stone walls, slate roof to main body of roof, corrugated galvanised iron roof to balcony. Cast iron wall brackets, balcony posts, iron lace balustrade. Style: Victorian Georgian.

The external condition of the property is good.

== Heritage listing ==
As at 23 November 2000, this residence is one of a two large mid Victorian, face sandstone terraces with balconies in mostly intact condition. The cast iron used to bracket the cantilevered balcony and the balustrade was manufactured by J. Bubb's Victoria Foundry.

It is part of the Millers Point Conservation Area, an intact residential and maritime precinct. It contains residential buildings and civic spaces dating from the 1830s and is an important example of 19th century adaptation of the landscape.

53–55 Kent Street, Millers Point was listed on the New South Wales State Heritage Register on 2 April 1999.

== See also ==
- 49–51 Kent Street
