= View Terrace facades =

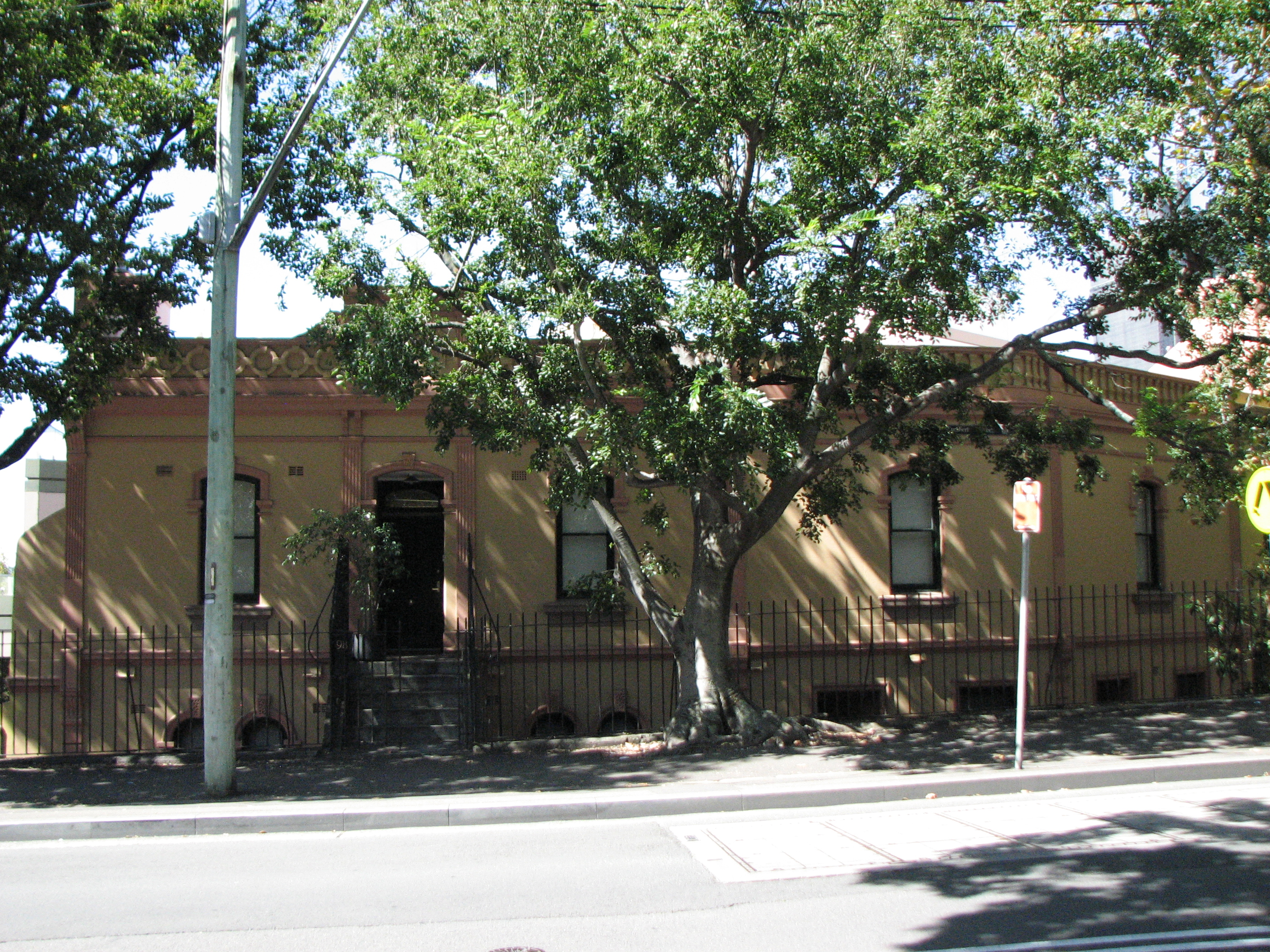
- View Terrace Facades, 26–30 Gloucester Street, The Rocks, NSW

- Location within Sydney Location within Australia
- 33.8594°S 151.2073°E
- Location: 26–30 Gloucester Street, The Rocks, City of Sydney, New South Wales, Australia

History
- Built: 1893

Site notes
- Architectural style: Victorian Italianate
- Owner: Property NSW

New South Wales Heritage Register
- Official name: View Terrace N & W Facades; Formerly 22-30 Gloucester Street; part of 40 Gloucester Street development
- Type: State heritage (built)
- Designated: 10 May 2002
- Reference no.: 1614
- Type: Terrace
- Category: Residential buildings (private)

The View Terrace facades are heritage-listed offices and a former residence and terrace houses located at 26–30 Gloucester Street, in the inner city Sydney suburb of The Rocks in the City of Sydney local government area of New South Wales, Australia. It was built from 1893 to 1893. It is also known as Formerly 22–30 Gloucester Street and part of 40 Gloucester Street development. The property is owned by Property NSW, an agency of the Government of New South Wales. It was added to the New South Wales State Heritage Register on 10 May 2002.

== History ==
In 1807, the date of Meehan's survey, this site lay to the west of gardens adjacent to the Hospital garden. It contained a well defined building alignment that represented the northern end of a long narrow block which commenced at Cribbs Lane (Cumberland Place). Prior to 1812, Stafford Lett occupied the house and land to the north of the site. In 1812 Lett sold this portion of the site to John Kinchela for £35. Kinchela died intestate and in 1839 his sister, Mary McCarthy, claimed and was granted title by the Commissioners of the Court of Claims. The southern portion of the site was granted unopposed to William Foster, a shipwright of Cumberland Street, in 1835.

Harper's survey of 1822 reveals a building outline on the site which appears to occupy part of both allotments. However, a sewerage survey of c. 1860 reveals two distinct adjoining buildings of similar size. In 1845, Council rate assessors noted a two-room stone building with shingled roof on the northern allotment and a building of similar description on the smaller southern allotment. Between 1849 and 1863, Council Assessors noted the owner, or landlord of the northern allotment as Thomas Douglas. Court of Claims records indicate that Mary McCarthy's sister's married surname was Douglas thus it is likely that the allotment remained within the family.

From 1861 to 1882 George Lake Young, an upholsterer was the owner, and landlord, of the northern premises and George Walker, a waterman, the tenant. This format continued almost unbroken till 1871 when Mr. Young took up residence however, in 1868, Sands Directory records that Nos. 44-46 Gloucester Street was vacant. In 1882 it appears that this house was demolished and the land left vacant for some years. The southern allotment had various tenants, including Thomas Mort, a quarryman; Edward Hancock, a mariner; Vincent Mathews and Antoine Murray until 1879 when Daniel Brown, a fireman, took up residence and retained till c. 1890 when this property was demolished. In 1893 William Hitchcock purchased the land and constructed a three-storey rendered brick Victorian Italianate style terrace of five houses naming them "View Terrace" (Nos. 22–30). Leased to numerous people, No. 22 also contained a shop occupied first by a watchmaker, a draper and then a series of confectioners. View Terrace was continuously tenanted for residential use until 1980.

In 1911–1912 Cumberland Street was realigned and in doing so broke through the Gloucester Street alignment at Argyle Street. As a result, No. 22–24 Gloucester Street were demolished and the road level was raised by three metres (nine point eight feet).

View Terrace, together with adjoining terraces Nos. 32–44, many of which had been vacant and in bad condition for a number of years, were recommended for redevelopment in the Sydney Cove Redevelopment Authority's planning review finalised in 1984. The retention and conservation of the whole Gloucester Street façade was also recommended. A four level office development was carried out in 1985–86, incorporating the Gloucester Street façade, and is known as 40 Gloucester Street. The northern side boundary wall of View Terrace was also retained in the development, and provides evidence that the terrace (Nos. 22-24) previously continued to the north.

== Description ==
View Terrace is a restrained Victorian Italianate style terrace of two houses built in 1893 of stuccoed brick. It has keystones, mouldings and label stops to each depressed arch opening above the windows and doorways. Half fluted pilasters divide the façade and define the recessed first floor balustraded balcony. The roof line is dominated by an elaborate parapet, the centre of which has the name View Terrace and the date 1892. It is below the current street line, but has a large forecourt. The original line of Gloucester Street is indicated in the paving. The forecourt extends to the north to an area overlooking Argyle Street shaded by a loquat tree, which was created with the building of the Argyle Bridge when Nos. 22-24 Gloucester Street were demolished. The terrace forms part of a row of 19th spec built and early 20th century welfare housing at 26-72 Gloucester Street.

Style: Victorian Italianate; Storeys: Two (Three to Cambridge Street); Roof Frame: Shingled.

=== Condition ===
As at 27 April 2001, Archaeology Assessment Condition: Mostly disturbed. Assessment Basis: Recently restored. Terraced into hill slope. Cellars.

=== Modifications and dates ===
- Early 20th century: Nos 22–24 Gloucester Street were demolished.
- The original road level was established and the line of the original kerb paved in sandstone. A flight of stairs has also been created leading from Gloucester Street to Cambridge Street on the southern side of No 40 Gloucester Street in the tradition of the lanes and stairs which are a feature of The Rocks.
- 1985–86: The facades of Nos. 26–30 Gloucester Street were retained as part of an office development at Nos. 26–40 Gloucester Street, now known as No. 40 Gloucester Street. The terrace at Nos. 42–44 Gloucester Street was demolished as part of this development and a two-storey infill building, sympathetic in scale and materials, was erected in its place. The work was completed in mid-1986.

== Heritage listing ==
As at 28 October 2008, View Terrace façades and site are of heritage significance for the State of NSW for their historical and scientific cultural values. The site and remnant structure are also of State heritage significance for their contribution to The Rocks area which is of State heritage significance in its own right. The site of View Terrace Façades has historical significance due to its continual occupation since 1822. The remnant façade fabric is aesthetically significant due to its unique configuration, fine detailing and landmark qualities, and its contribution to the streetscape as demonstrated by the surviving scale and form of the original building. The View Terrace façade is part of a row of terrace house façades along Gloucester Street at Nos. 26-72 (excluding Nos. 42–44, demolished in 1985) which remain basically unaltered in external appearance since their construction. As part of this row View Terrace façade demonstrates "a rare juxtaposed study of the English terrace house form and its evolution as translated in Australia", (as identified by the National Trust).

The changes which View Terrace façade survived have the ability to demonstrate a significant part of the story of The Rocks over time, including the civic improvements by the Sydney Harbour Trust involving the realignment of Gloucester and Cumberland Streets, and the building of the Argyle Stairs and Bridge in 1911-1912 which resulted in the demolition of 22-24 Gloucester Street. In the 1980s, the site was redeveloped to create an office block, and the Government involvement resulted in the design that incorporated the northern and western façades of the View Terrace into the newly created structure. These changes demonstrate various attitudes to heritage conservation policy and practice in different periods, and demonstrate the impact of resident and community action on the Government policies for the retention of buildings in The Rocks.

The View Terrace facades was listed on the New South Wales State Heritage Register on 10 May 2002 having satisfied the following criteria.

The place is important in demonstrating the course, or pattern, of cultural or natural history in New South Wales.

The remnant façade of the View Terrace, 26-30 Gloucester Street, provides important evidence of the street plan and layout before the major realignment in 1911. The floor levels of the former terrace, close to the Gloucester Street lower level, the steps to Cumberland Street and the footbridge from Cumberland Street pavement to the upper level of View Terrace at 98 Cumberland Street provide evidence of this change. The surviving façade fabric provides evidence of the design of terrace houses in Australia in the Victorian period. The fabric demonstrates the residential character of The Rocks of Victorian period. The original creation of View Terrace was part of the speculative housing developments, purposely built to generate rental income c. 1892. The terrace was subjected to resumption by the Government in 1900, used as working class accommodation after that date and redeveloped in the 1980s. The surviving façade is an example of the 1980s "façade-ist" approach to the conservation practice. It is demonstrative of this, now abandoned, understanding of significance based merely on the presentation of an item to the general public. The item meets this criterion on State level.

The place has a strong or special association with a person, or group of persons, of importance of cultural or natural history of New South Wales's history.

The terrace was built and owned by William Hitchcock, who used it for the generation of rental income. It was resumed by the Government in 1900, rented to workers until the 1980s. The View Terrace had no known special association with any individuals notable in the history of The Rocks or NSW. The item does not meet this criterion.

The place is important in demonstrating aesthetic characteristics and/or a high degree of creative or technical achievement in New South Wales.

The surviving façade presents with a high degree of architectural integrity and its period detailing is fully compatible with the surviving Victorian imagery of much of the Gloucester Street. While the building is now used as offices, the appearance of the façade maintains a reference to past residential use, and strongly contributes to the aesthetic character of the streetscape. The building has strong visual relationships with adjacent buildings, including the terraces at 32-36 and 38-40 Gloucester Street, which enhance the presentation of its aesthetic character. The item meets this criterion on Local level.

The place has a strong or special association with a particular community or cultural group in New South Wales for social, cultural or spiritual reasons.

The Gloucester Street Terraces' façades were preserved as a consequence of the activities of the Green Bans movement. Since the resumption of the area by the Government, the original terraces were occupied by the working class renters and associated with series of activities of the Government aiming to improve social condition of the residents, e.g. fixed rents established by the Fair Rents Act which made long term renting affordable, and allowed many tenants to stay at the same residence for years. These associations however are generally applicable to most historic residences in the area. The item does not meet this criterion.

The place has potential to yield information that will contribute to an understanding of the cultural or natural history of New South Wales.

It is considered that any such potential of the original structure was lost due to the extensive excavations and demolition of the houses behind the façade line c. 1986, however, the façade was identified by the National Trust to be of potential interest for further research of evolution of terrace houses' façade forms in NSW. The item meets this criterion on State level.

The place possesses uncommon, rare or endangered aspects of the cultural or natural history of New South Wales.

The surviving façades are remnant of an item built to a unique design, albeit within the characteristic architectural style of its date of creation. The item meets this criterion on Local level.

The place is important in demonstrating the principal characteristics of a class of cultural or natural places/environments in New South Wales.

The surviving façades are representative of the architectural style of the terraces, and this design was noted in the studies of the National Trust on development of the terrace houses in Australia. The item meets this criterion on State level.

== See also ==
- Australian residential architectural styles
