= Palisade Hotel =

Historic pub in Sydney, New South Wales

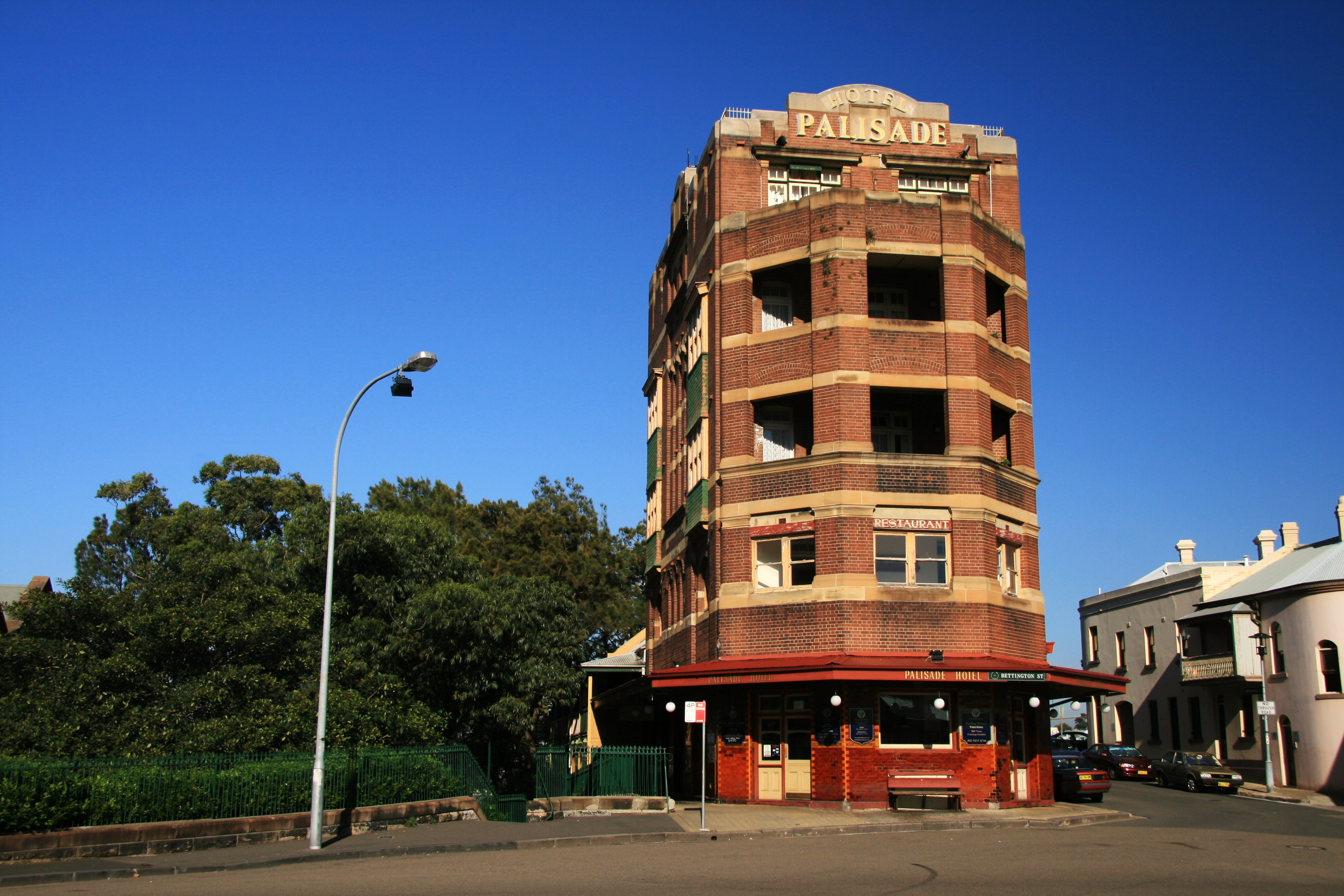
- Palisade Hotel in 2007

- Location within Sydney Location within Australia
- 33.8580°S 151.2022°E
- Location: 35–37 Bettington Street, Millers Point, City of Sydney, New South Wales, Australia

New South Wales Heritage Register
- Official name: Palisade Hotel
- Type: state heritage (built)
- Designated: 2 April 1999
- Reference no.: 510
- Type: Hotel
- Category: Commercial

Palisade Hotel is a heritage-listed pub and hotel located at 35–37 Bettington Street, in the inner city Sydney suburb of Millers Point of New South Wales, Australia, adjacent to Barangaroo Reserve. Administratively, the hotel is in the City of Sydney local government area. It was designed by Henry Deane ('H.D.') Walsh and built in 1915–16. It is privately owned. It was added to the New South Wales State Heritage Register on 2 April 1999.The roof-top bar and lounge atop the Hotel is named after Deane.

== History ==
Millers Point and the adjacent Walsh Bay have been a residential and dockyard area since the mid 19th century. The current Palisade Hotel was built on the site of an earlier hotel of the same name. In the 1870s the site was owned by James Parle. The first rate for the hotel was paid in 1880 and it is assumed that it was built close to that time. The rate book described the hotel as a three-storey brick-and-stone building with an iron roof and twelve rooms. This hotel was kept by Henry Taylor until 1911.

The early years of the twentieth century following Federation were characterised by a new confidence and nationalism. After the bubonic plague crisis around the turn of the century the population of Millers Point grew again and the demand for watering holes was such that the Sydney Harbour Trust had to build replacement hotels to cater to the port workers and local community. The new Palisade Hotel was one of four that were built by the Trust, the others being Dumbarton Castle, the Big House (now the Sussex Hotel) and the Harbour View Hotel.

The construction of the Palisade Hotel commenced on 6 April 1915 and was completed in May 1916 at a total cost of just over 3000 pounds. The hotel was described as consisting of five storeys built of stone, brick and cement, with steel and timber framing. It contained a large bar, two parlours on the ground floor, two sitting rooms and dining room on the first floor, 15 bedrooms, kitchen, laundry, bathrooms, lavatories, pantries and a large flat roof for drying purposes. There was also a fire escape complete with landing at each floor.

The 1916 plans of the hotel indicates a long, U-shaped bar on the ground floor with a canopy facing the main entrance. The public bar was at the front, and behind this was a private bar on one side and a jug and bottle department on the other. Two parlours towards the rear of the ground floor accessed from a separate private entrance way were provided. A hall divided these parlours from the public bar area. The parlours were heated with open fires. In the basement were toilets, bottle store and the cellar with a floor hatch to provide access to the bar serving area.

A report on the hotel in 1949 provides an indication as to the use of the hotel. Few changes were made from the original layout. The first floor was residential with two bedrooms a dining room, kitchenette and lounge. On the second floor were six bedrooms, one being used as a sitting room, toilet, bathroom, and linen room. On the fourth floor was the kitchen, breakfast room, staff room, kitchen servery and ladies toilet. In all there were twelve single and one double bedroom, with five single and one double room used by the licensee and staff.

From the 1920s the head lease for the hotel was owned by Tooth and Co. who sub let it to various licensees. From 1936, when the role of the Sydney Harbour Trust was taken over by the newly formed Maritime Service Board, title to the hotel was issued to the MSB, however Tooths continued to lease it until 1950 when the lease was tendered and Tooths did not apply. At that time the licensee, P. K. Armstrong, obtained the lease. In February 1987 title passed from the MSB into private ownership, then in 1994, Palisade Properties Pty Ltd obtained title.

It was closed for renovations in 2008 and was closed for seven years. The renovations added a rooftop bar, a new main bar and boutique accommodation. In May 2015, Palisade Properties sold the renovated building to British entrepreneur Richard Sapsford in May 2015 for $17.7 million. It reopened in August 2015, with "Henry Deane" (H.D. Walsh), the rooftop bar, opening that November.

== Description ==
The hotel is located at 35 Bettington Street and is built to the boundaries of the land. It abuts Bettington Street to the north, the junction of Argyle Place and Dalgety Road to the east, and the Munn Street Reserve to the south.

The hotel is a seven-storey masonry building, including basement, five storeys of rooms and a rooftop enclosed bar and terrace. The building has stone and brickwork base courses, load bearing brickwork with stone detailing above, and timber and steel floor and roof framing.

Interior walls are either plastered masonry or plastered timber-framed construction. Doors and windows are timber framed. The hotel has a cantilevered verandah to its north, south and east sides with a full height metal fire stair attached to the west wall which is partly enclosed by the brick wall. The roof is an open flat area surfaced in synthetic grass set behind a parapet which includes a name plate of the hotel name.

The ground floor façade is tiled with original ceramic tiles and the building retains the original timber framed doors and windows. The side facades feature projecting two storey bays with timber shingles above wide arched windows. A group of narrow arched windows light the staircase.

The planning of the hotel varies from floor to floor. The basement has a large central store area to the east with a series of minor rooms to the west. The ground floor is dominated by the bar room to the east, with a hallway, two parlours and a toilet to the west. There is a full height stairway located centrally on the north side. The first floor has two large connected rooms above the bar, a small room created by the enclosure of the eastern verandah, a former toilet, office/bar room and kitchen. Also starting on this level and running up the height of the building are the remnants of a flood lift with an enclosed lobby/alcove on the first, second and third floors.

The second and third floors have similar planning comprising six accommodation rooms each with a central section having a stair landing, two bathrooms, linen room, and the remnant flood lift. The east facing rooms each have access to the verandahs on each level.

The fourth floor has a number of rooms to the east, two of which open onto an open balcony, the landing for the stair, the floor lift, and small kitchen. At the west end is an open terrace with access to a toilet and enclosed bar, as well as stairs to the fifth floor bar and terrace.

== Modifications and dates ==
- 1921 – Partition removed from bar
- 1926 – Addition of servants' dining room, painting of fire escape
- 1932 – Paint, grain and varnish to exterior woodwork below awning, oil paint to inside of awning, fascia and roof.
- 1939 – Construction of ladies toilets on ground floor, removal of part of the existing fire escape to a new position, two new doors in the cellar, increased height to handrail and gate in the bar at the top of the stairs to basement
- 1940 – Renovations to a bedroom and public bar
- 1949 – woodwork stained and varnished, advertising mirrors set in wooden frames
- 1950 — major paintwork undertaken including exterior painting, colouring and sign writing, painting and kalsomining interior walls and ceilings, painting and varnishing woodwork.
- Unknown date – enclosure of first floor balcony
- 1979 – Removal of original bar counter
- 1996 – bedrooms and bathrooms on upper floors upgraded and kitchen modernised.
- 2008–2015 – renovations to add main bar, upgrade of bedrooms and add new rooftop bar

== Significance ==
The Palisade Hotel is of historic significance for its association with the acquisition, redevelopment and long-term management of large areas around Sydney Harbour by the NSW Government following the outbreak of the bubonic plague in 1900. The hotel is significant having been built by the Sydney Harbour Trust in 1915–16 as one of four hotels provided by the Trust to replace those demolished to provide facilities for port workers and the local community. Stylistically the hotel was built in an era of prodigious hotel building between 1900 and 1914, which ended with the onset of World War I. Its ongoing use as a hotel since its construction in 1916 with relatively few modifications to layout and fabric further highlights its significance. Its prominent location and continued use demonstrates its significance as part of the social life of Millers Point. The Palisade Hotel is significant having been designed by Henry Deane Walsh, an engineer important in the history of NSW especially related to developments around Sydney Harbour in the early twentieth century. The hotel is of aesthetic significance as an exceptional example of a federation free style building with arts and crafts influences. Its dramatic form with a very tall and narrow expression is an important contributory feature to the Millers Point townscape resulting in the building being a prominent landmark feature in the area. Its prominent siting provides terminal views along several streets.

== Heritage listing ==
Palisade Hotel was listed on the New South Wales State Heritage Register on 2 April 1999.
