= 71 Windmill Street, Millers Point =

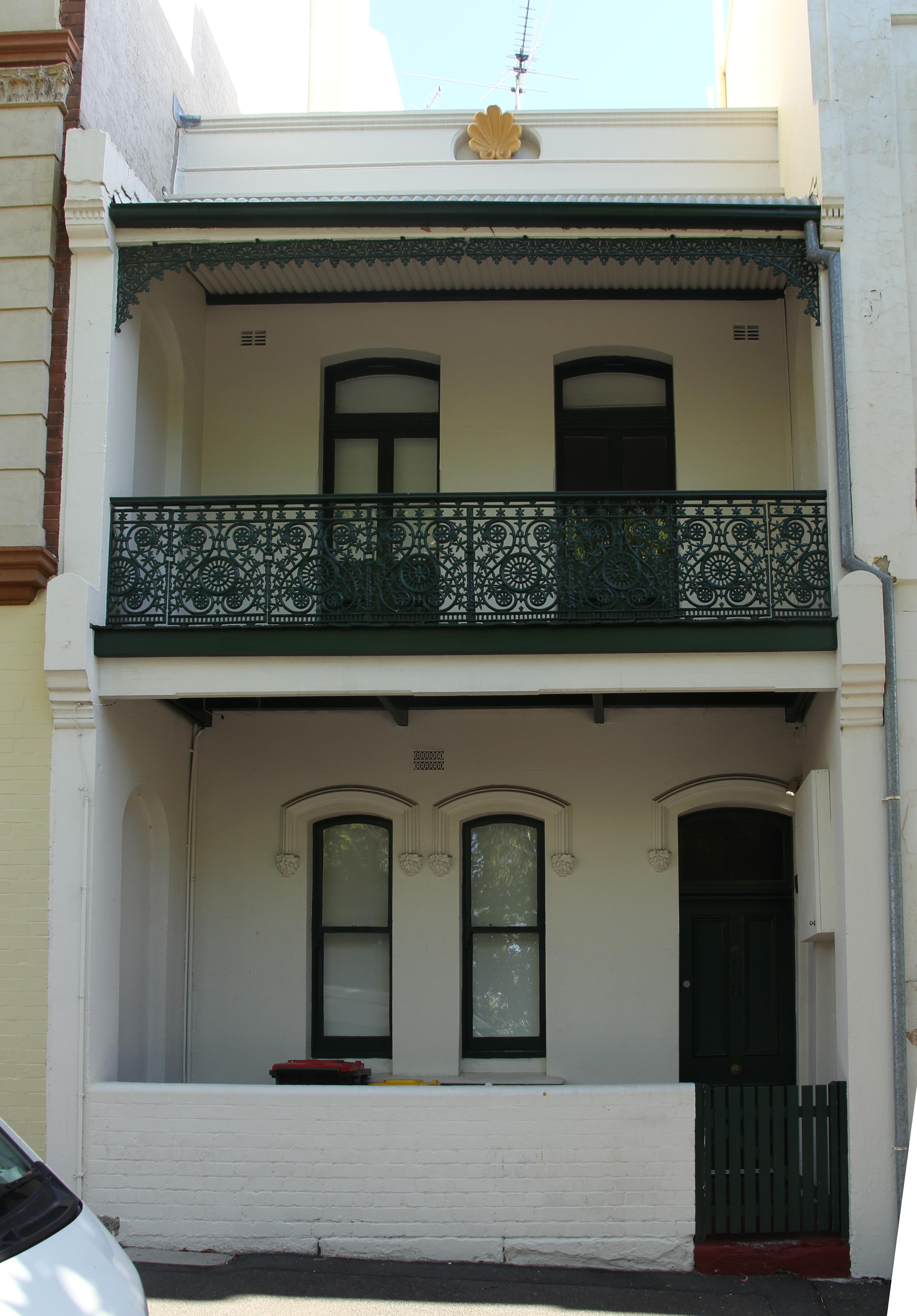
- 71 Windmill Street, pictured in 2019.

- Location within Sydney Location within Australia
- 33.8578°S 151.2055°E
- Location: 71 Windmill Street, Millers Point, City of Sydney, New South Wales, Australia

History
- Built: 1880s

Site notes
- Architectural style: Victorian Italianate

New South Wales Heritage Register
- Official name: Terrace
- Type: State heritage (built)
- Designated: 2 April 1999
- Reference no.: 845
- Type: Terrace
- Category: Residential buildings (private)

71 Windmill Street, Millers Point is a heritage-listed terrace house located at 71 Windmill Street, in the inner city Sydney suburb of Millers Point in the City of Sydney local government area of New South Wales, Australia. The property was added to the New South Wales State Heritage Register on 2 April 1999.

== History ==
Millers Point is one of the earliest areas of European settlement in Australia, and a focus for maritime activities. This Victorian two-storey terrace house was constructed during the 1880s, along with a neighbouring building, on the site of the former "Hit or Miss Hotel".

== Description ==
Two storey, four bedroom Victorian terrace. Infilled balcony with iron lace balustrade and valence on upper storey. Storeys: Two; Construction: Painted rendered masonry, corrugated galvanised iron roof, painted timber joinery. Style: Victorian Italianate.

The external condition of the property is good.

=== Modifications and dates ===
External: Verandah infill.

== Heritage listing ==
As at 23 November 2000, this terrace house was constructed during the 1880s, along with neighbouring buildings as redevelopment of older buildings.

It is part of the Millers Point Conservation Area, an intact residential and maritime precinct. It contains residential buildings and civic spaces dating from the 1830s and is an important example of C19th adaptation of the landscape.

71 Windmill Street, Millers Point was listed on the New South Wales State Heritage Register on 2 April 1999.

== See also ==
- Australian residential architectural styles
- 69 Windmill Street
- Stevens Terrace
