= 1–63 Windmill Street, Millers Point =

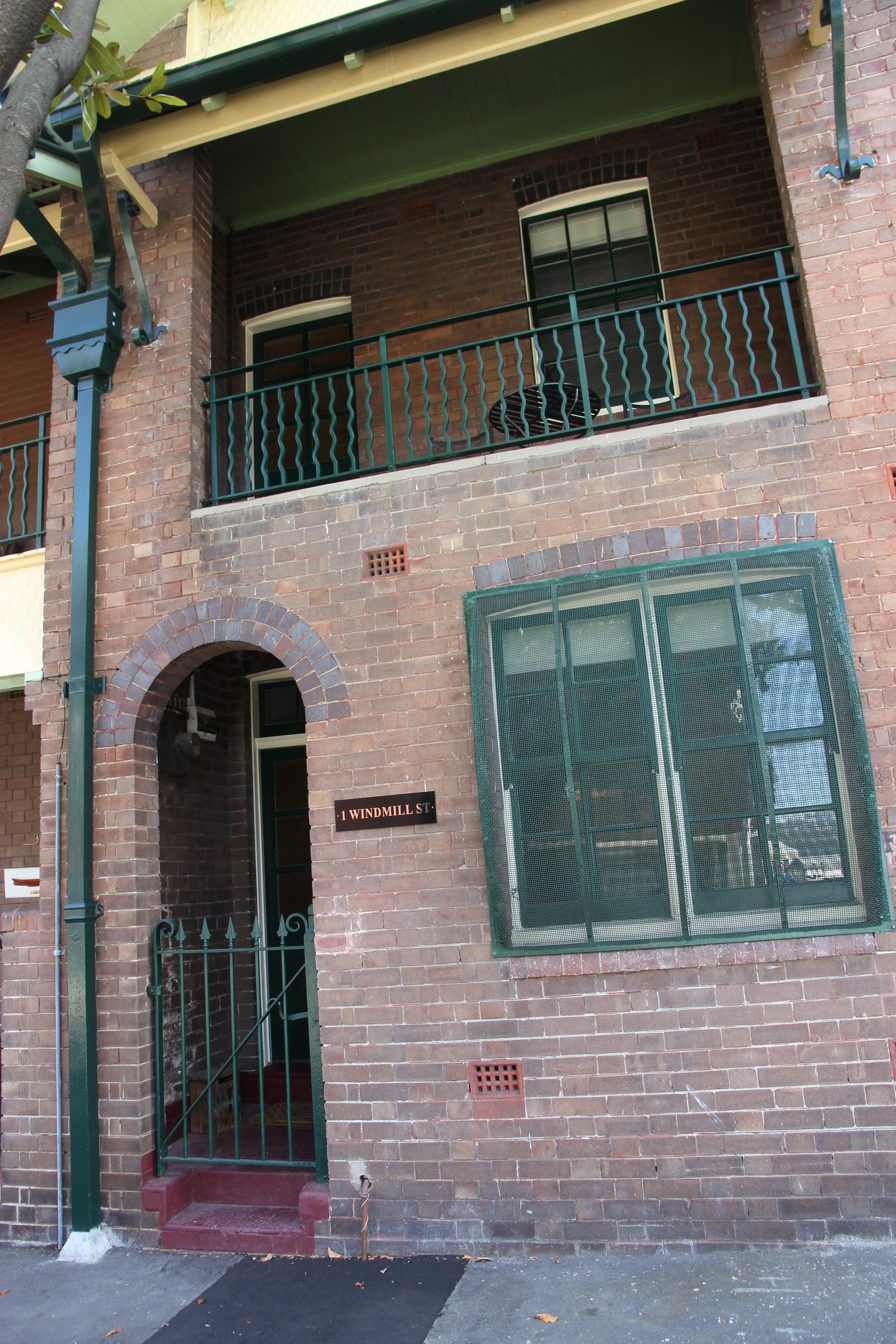
- 1 Windmill Street, pictured in 2019

- Location within Sydney Location within Australia
- 33.8578°S 151.2044°E
- Location: 1–63 Windmill Street, Millers Point, City of Sydney, New South Wales, Australia

History
- Built: c. 1910

Site notes
- Architectural style: Federation

New South Wales Heritage Register
- Official name: Terrace
- Type: State heritage (built)
- Designated: 2 April 1999
- Reference no.: 896
- Type: Terrace
- Category: Residential buildings (private)

1–63 Windmill Street, Millers Point is a heritage-listed residence located at 1–63 Windmill Street, in the inner city Sydney suburb of Millers Point in the City of Sydney local government area of New South Wales, Australia. The property is privately owned. It was added to the New South Wales State Heritage Register on 2 April 1999.

== History ==
Millers Point is one of the earliest areas of European settlement in Australia, and a focus for maritime activities.

This terrace was built c. 1910 as part of the post-plague redevelopment. An 1880 plan shows a two-storey hotel on this site.

In 1958 architect John Fisher (member of the Institute of Architects, the Cumberland County Council Historic Buildings Committee and on the first Council of the National Trust of Australia (NSW) after its reformation in 1960), with the help of artist Cedric Flower, convinced Taubmans to paint the central bungalow at 50 Argyle Place. This drew attention to the importance of The Rocks for the first time. As a result, Fisher was able to negotiate leases for Bligh House (later ClydeBank) and houses in Windmill Street for various medical societies.

First tenanted by the NSW Department of Housing in 1982.

== Description ==
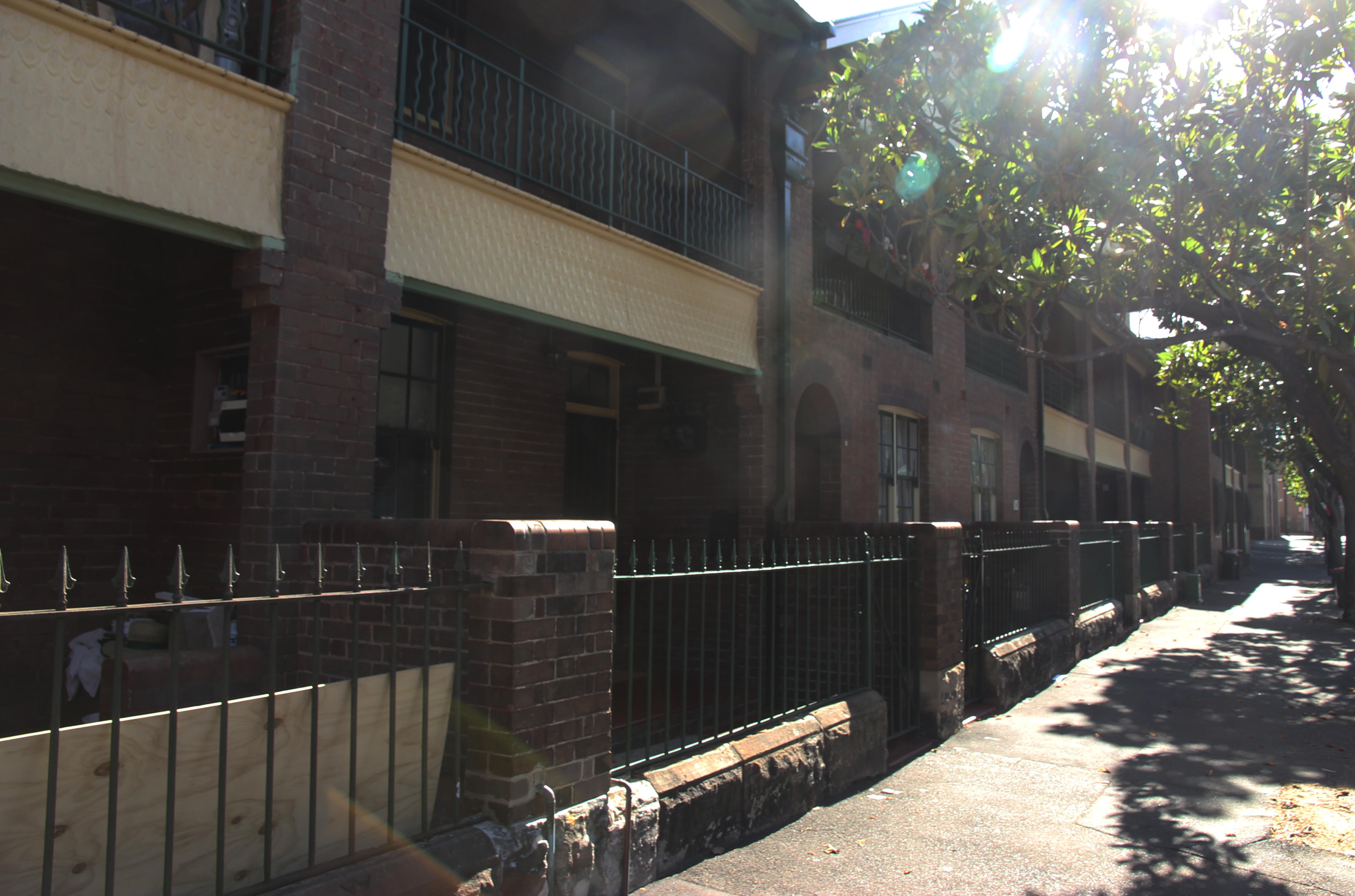
A row of the terrace houses comprising 1-63 Windmill Street, pictured in 2019.

Two storey, three bedroom, Federation terrace with gable to street. Decorative pressed metal gable detailing. Storeys: Two; Construction: Face brick, painted reinforced concrete, pressed metal, corrugated galvanised iron, painted joinery. Cast iron railings. Style: Federation.

The external condition of the building is good.

=== Modifications and dates ===
External: Surface mounted services.

== Heritage listing ==
As at 23 November 2000, 1–63 Windmill Street is an extensive group of Federation style terraces in very good condition, having high streetscape value.

It is part of the Millers Point Conservation Area, an intact residential and maritime precinct. It contains residential buildings and civic spaces dating from the 1830s and is an important example of 19th century adaptation of the landscape.

1–63 Windmill Street, Millers Point was listed on the New South Wales State Heritage Register on 2 April 1999.

== See also ==
- Australian residential architectural styles
- 65 Windmill Street
