= 65 Windmill Street, Millers Point =

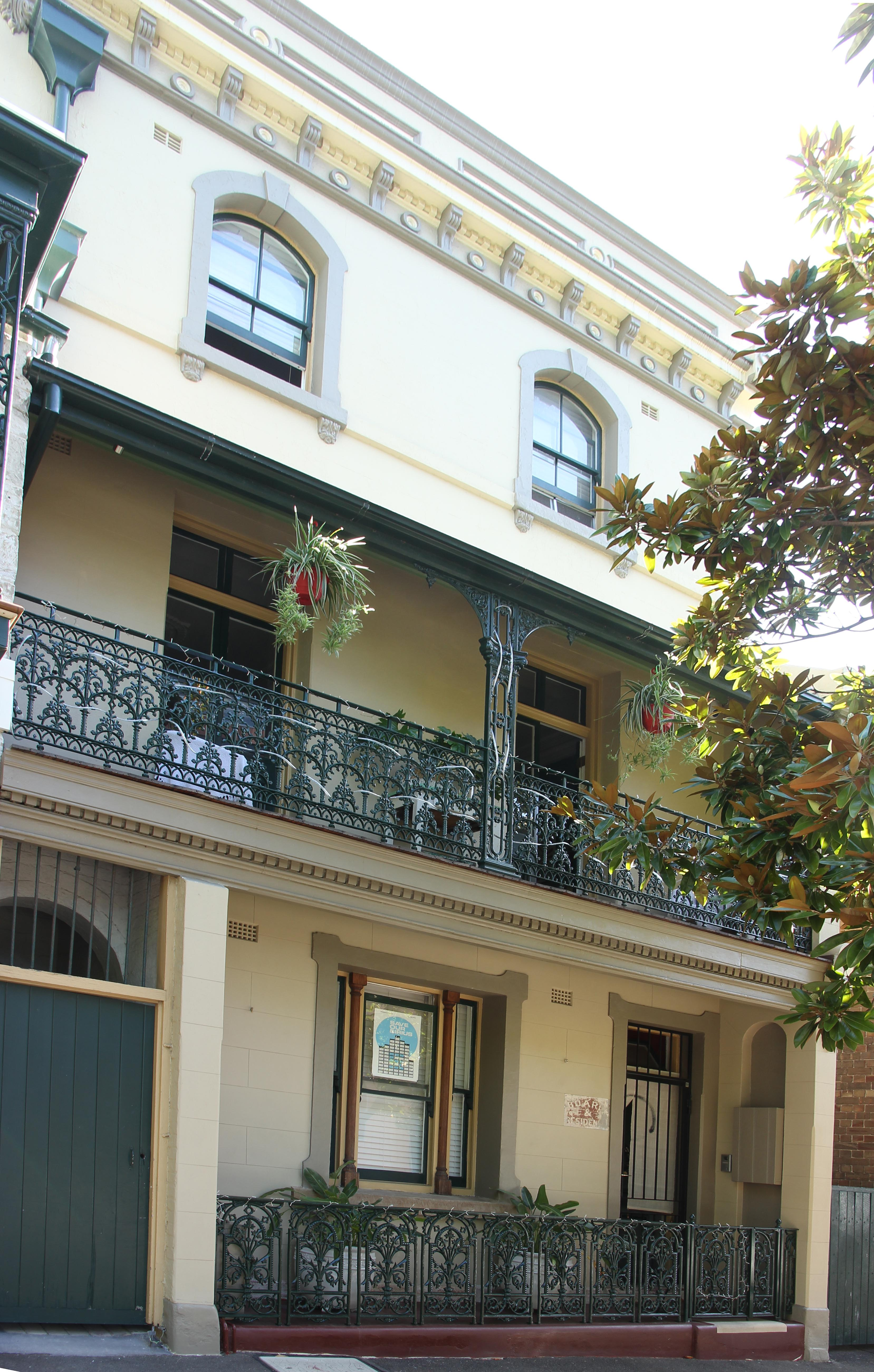
- 65 Windmill Street, pictured in 2019.

- Location within Sydney Location within Australia
- 33.8578°S 151.2053°E
- Location: 65 Windmill Street, Millers Point, City of Sydney, New South Wales, Australia

Site notes
- Architectural style: Victorian Italianate

New South Wales Heritage Register
- Official name: Terrace
- Type: State heritage (built)
- Designated: 2 April 1999
- Reference no.: 846
- Type: Terrace
- Category: Residential buildings (private)

65 Windmill Street, Millers Point is a heritage-listed boarding house and former residence located at 65 Windmill Street, in the inner city Sydney suburb of Millers Point in the City of Sydney local government area of New South Wales, Australia. The property was added to the New South Wales State Heritage Register on 2 April 1999.

== History ==
Millers Point is one of the earliest areas of European settlement in Australia, and a focus for maritime activities. Three storey terrace built during 1880s, and first tenanted by DoH in 1983.

== Description ==
Three storey, Victorian Italianate terrace with two storey verandah. Highly decorative parapet. Now a five bedroom boarding house. Storeys: Three; Construction: Painted rendered masonry walls. Corrugated galvanised iron roof. Iron lace balustrading. Painted timber joinery. Style: Victorian Italianate.

The external condition of the property is good.

=== Modifications and dates ===
External: Joinery modified. Building services surface mounted.

== Heritage listing ==
As at 23 November 2000, this Victorian Italianate terrace was built during the 1880s, and is a significant streetscape element.

It is part of the Millers Point Conservation Area, an intact residential and maritime precinct. It contains residential buildings and civic spaces dating from the 1830s and is an important example of 19th century adaptation of the landscape.

65 Windmill Street, Millers Point was listed on the New South Wales State Heritage Register on 2 April 1999.

== See also ==
- Australian residential architectural styles
- 1-63 Windmill Street
- 67 Windmill Street
