= 69 Windmill Street, Millers Point =

Heritage-listed residence in Australia

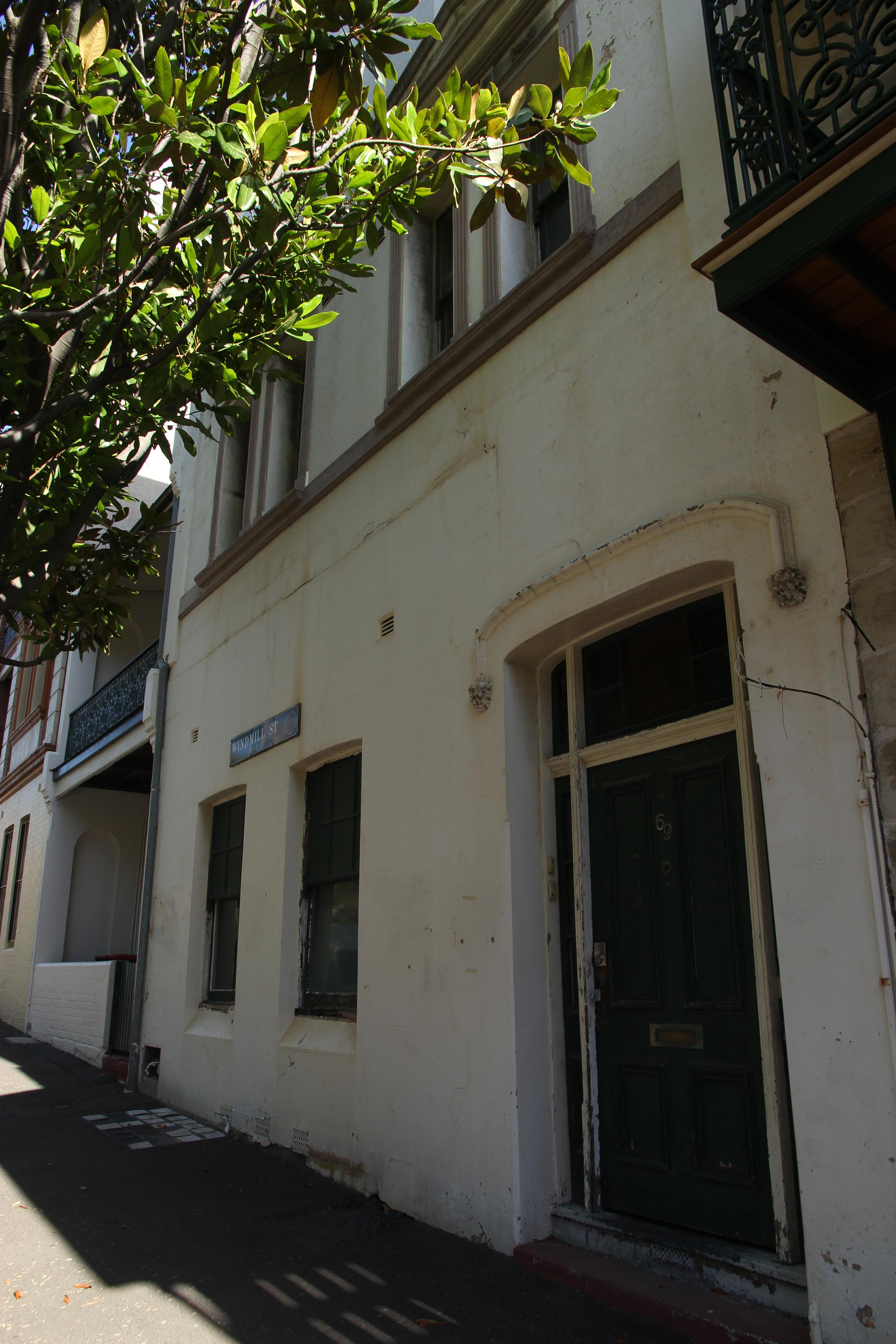
- 69 Windmill Street, pictured in 2019.

- Location within Sydney Location within Australia
- 33.8578°S 151.2054°E
- Location: 69 Windmill Street, Millers Point, City of Sydney, New South Wales, Australia

History
- Built: 1845–1901

Site notes
- Architectural style: Victorian Italianate

New South Wales Heritage Register
- Official name: Terrace; Hit or Miss Hotel; Empire Service Hostel
- Type: State heritage (built)
- Designated: 2 April 1999
- Reference no.: 853
- Type: Terrace
- Category: Residential buildings (private)

69 Windmill Street, Millers Point is a heritage-listed residence and former retail building located at 69 Windmill Street, in the inner city Sydney suburb of Millers Point in the City of Sydney local government area of New South Wales, Australia. It was built from 1845 to 1901. It is also known as Hit or Miss Hotel; Empire Service Hostel. It was added to the New South Wales State Heritage Register on 2 April 1999.

== History ==
Millers Point is one of the earliest areas of European settlement in Australia, and a focus for maritime activities.

=== The subject site ===
The subject site land was part of Lot 3 of Section 94 granted to Irish-born labourer Thomas Stevens. He had been sentenced to 14 years transportation to Australia, arriving in Port Jackson on "The Pilot" in 1817. Stevens did not serve his full term, by 1825 he had been freed and was employed by John Harris, Constable of the Melville district (near Bathurst). He married Catherine Larkins (also a transported convict) and by 1828 they had a one-year-old son, Patrick.

By 1845 Stevens was listed in the Rates and Assessment Books as residing in Windmill Street. The building (located on the subject site) is described as of two storeys with seven rooms, stone and brick construction with a shingle roof, outhouses in middling repair, indicating that part of the complex at least had not been recently constructed. At that time it was listed as 6 Windmill Street. Windmill Street had long contained public houses, with a number concentrated at the eastern end.

==== The Hit and Miss Hotel ====
In 1840 there was a public house called the "Hit or Miss Hotel" in Windmill Street, however its location has not been determined. The publican was known as Enos Andrews. Rate books show two buildings on Stevens' lot: a substantial masonry building fronting the street and a timber house at the rear. Following Thomas Sr's death in 1850, his widow Catherine turned their residence at no. 6 Windmill Street into a public house which she named the "Hit or Miss Hotel". Thomas Sr's probate was not finalised until 1884 and was the subject of an 1897 court case. He had left his property to his widow who, in 1851, was living in timber building at the rear.

At least three generations of Stevens family held the license form 1852, when the Hit and Miss was first licensed, until 1912. The name is believed to derive from Thomas' love of hunting, however, as previously mentioned, there was an earlier "Hit or Miss Hotel" in Windmill Street in 1840. Unlike many hotels in the area, the name did not indicate that it catered to a particular client group such as whalers or shipwrightts or nationality, such as the "Erin-go-Bragh".

Catherine Stevens died at her residence in 1867. At that time she owned three additional houses in Windmill Street, two small houses listed as "old places" and a more valuable stone house closer to the "Hit and Miss" (where she lived). Two of her sons John and Thomas (Jr.) are listed as living at the "Hit or Miss" complex in 1871, and the owners are listed as being J. & R. (John and Richard). John Stevens is recorded as adding an awning to his premises at 6 Windmill Street in 1879 (to the original "Hit or Miss Hotel". This probably replaced an earlier verandah. John M.Stevens, one of Catherine and Thomas' grandsons, took over as publican and periodically operated the hotel until 1912. Some years a manager or licensee was also listed. The 1880 Dove's plan notes the licensee as Manning.

In 1893 Michael Finnan applied to renew the license of the Hit or Miss Hotel, Windmill Street and gained it after an objection based on the bad construction of the house and that the hotel could very easily be dispensed with. This problem in obtaining the new license may have been what prompted the family to rebuild the hotel.

In 1896 a case was heard in the Equity Court between Stevens descendants, on a suit arising from the will of the late Thomas Stevens. Once resolved, rebuilding of the complex began. Following the court case in 1897-8, J. M. Stevens and a number of family members acquired the adjacent land building a tenement block, residence and the new Hit or Miss Hotel. The two Colonial Georgian houses fronting Windmill Street, the two storey timber residence at the rear and all the sheds were removed. Some of the salvage materials appear to have been used to build the sandstone and brick block at the rear and part of the ground floor walls of the hotel. J. M. Stevens probably coordinated the building works. No tender notices have been located, other than one for supply of 10,000 bricks in 1898. The new Hit or Miss Hotel was complete by April 1899 and the tenement building a year later, just before the notification of the resumption of the entire block. The (adjoining) Stevens Building was built before any government attempts to provide workers housing in Sydney and the block was very popular.

The main block of the hotel is a three-storey rendered brick building with Italianate detailing and, in its original configuration, there was a timber post-supported verandah to the street. Under that was an elaborate screen in the Art Nouveau style behind which was an elaborate set of lead light doors. The upper facade section appears to be old-fashioned in comparison with the Stevens Buildings. The architect has not been determined.

From 1900-02 the Stevens family were living in the Hit or Miss Hotel, however their trade is likely to have been affected by the outbreak of plague in 1900.

Figure 11 shows the resumption of lands in the area c. 1900. It shows the neighbouring buildings and an empty lot on 716 and 716a (area of the subject site) suggesting that the redevelopment of the complex had not yet been completed. In 1902 the subject site was listed under the Stevens Estate and had an annual gross value of £172, the building described in the Rates and Assessment books as a 3-storey hotel with a brick cellar and occupied by John M. Stevens.

By 1907 the hotel was listed under the ownership of the NSW Government Rocks Resumption and had an annual gross value of £414. In 1911 the site is still occupied by John M. Stevens, the hotel's address number changed from 61 to 69 Windmill Street and was identified to be the "Hotel Hit or Miss".

In the early 1920s the hotel was briefly under the ownership of Tooth and Co., however they did not retain any detailed records. In July 1923 the License Reduction Board "depreived 49 hotels of their licenses" including the Hit or Miss, with the owner and licensee each receiving compensation.

The hotel was re-opened in May 1925 as a migrant hostel, the Empire Service Hostel. Little if any alteration to the building appears to have been undertaken and by August 1926 the hostel had housed 300 migrants. The object was to provide accommodation for migrant families arriving from overseas under Government and other schemes.

In 1900 the outbreak of bubonic plague in Sydney's portside brought wholesale resumption of these areas by government. This was staged, the Darling Harbour Resumption in May 1900 and the entire Rocks area in December 1900, affecting parts of Millers Point and the wharfage along Sussex Street. To administer these the government established a number of authorities aiming to address longstanding problems in housing, wharf accommodation and transport links, the longest-serving being the Sydney Harbour Trust. Under its Act, the Trust was responsible for improving and preserving the port of Sydney; however it also took on the administration of other functions such as housing. Its statutory powers were comprehensive and supplanted the City Council's planning controls and other day-to-day functions such as road maintenance, etc. The Trust since its inception in 1901 had control over the port area to the west of the (this) terrace. Over the following decades the Trust remodelled the whole of the wharfage at Walsh Bay and the road network servicing the wharves. The built character of Millers Point today with its finger jetties, large warehouses, terraces of working men's houses originate from this resumption.

==== Conversion into flats ====
After closure of the Empire Service Hostel in 1930 the Sydney Harbour Trust remodelled the former hotel/hostel, dividing it into flats. The Art Nouveau style timberwork beneath the verandah was removed and a new front wall built. The footpath awning may also have been removed. A new kitchen was installed in the rear wing and the laundry relocated to the rear. The copper was removed and a bath installed. A new WC was installed, accessed from the yard. On the first floor a new screen was installed to the staircase (which may have come from downstairs) and a kitchen installed, with a high light window over. A new bathroom was added between the main block of the former hotel and the rear wing. On the second floor a screen was added to the stair and a new kitchen and bathroom added. The sink formed the bulkhead to the window to the kitchen below (a configuration that survives today). The rate books don't record individual flat occupants.

The supervising architect for the Sydney Harbour Trust William Henry Withers checked the plans and they were approved by the Engineer in Chief and Assistant Engineer.

With the creation of the Maritime Services Board (MSB) in 1936 many of the properties within the resumed aera were transferred to the Board's control. The 1939 and 1949 Rates and Assessments Books record the former hotel, house and flats were all listed as under the control of the MSB. In 1983 the MSB disposed of its "non port related" land in Sydney and Newcastle. Amongst properties involved were all the residences at Millers Point, transferred to the Housing Commission. A review by the new administration suggested that much needed to be done to bring dwellings up to standards expected of a government department specifically charged with providing adequate housing and a programme of property improvement began. This property was first tenanted by the NSW Department of Housing in 1983.

Some changes in housing allocation also eventuated. Like the MSB, the Housing Commission initially gave preference to long-term tenants who had connections with the maritime industry. But the realities of change had to be faced. With the demise of the working waterfront at Millers Point and no younger generation of waterside workers, the traditional link between Millers Point as both work place and home was loosening. The Housing Commission and its successor the NSW Department of Housing, had to provide for all in need of housing, from all over Sydney. Inevitably, new people, having no previous connection with Millers Point, were accommodated in the area.

The property is currently commercially operated by RUN property as five flats with three separate tenancies on behalf of the NSW Land and Housing Corporation.

== Description ==
Late Victorian three storey terrace with elaborate stuccoed mouldings to windows and parapet. Now a five bedroom boarding house. Storeys: Three; Construction: Painted rendered masonry walls, corrugated galvanised iron roof. Painted timber joinery. Style: Victorian Italianate.

The external condition of the property is good.

== Heritage listing ==
As at 23 November 2000, this terrace house was constructed during the 1880s, along with neighbouring buildings as redevelopment of older buildings.

It is part of the Millers Point Conservation Area, an intact residential and maritime precinct. It contains residential buildings and civic spaces dating from the 1830s and is an important example of 19th century adaptation of the landscape.

Terrace was listed on the New South Wales State Heritage Register on 2 April 1999.

== See also ==
- Australian residential architectural styles
- 67 Windmill Street
- 71 Windmill Street
