= 67 Windmill Street, Millers Point =

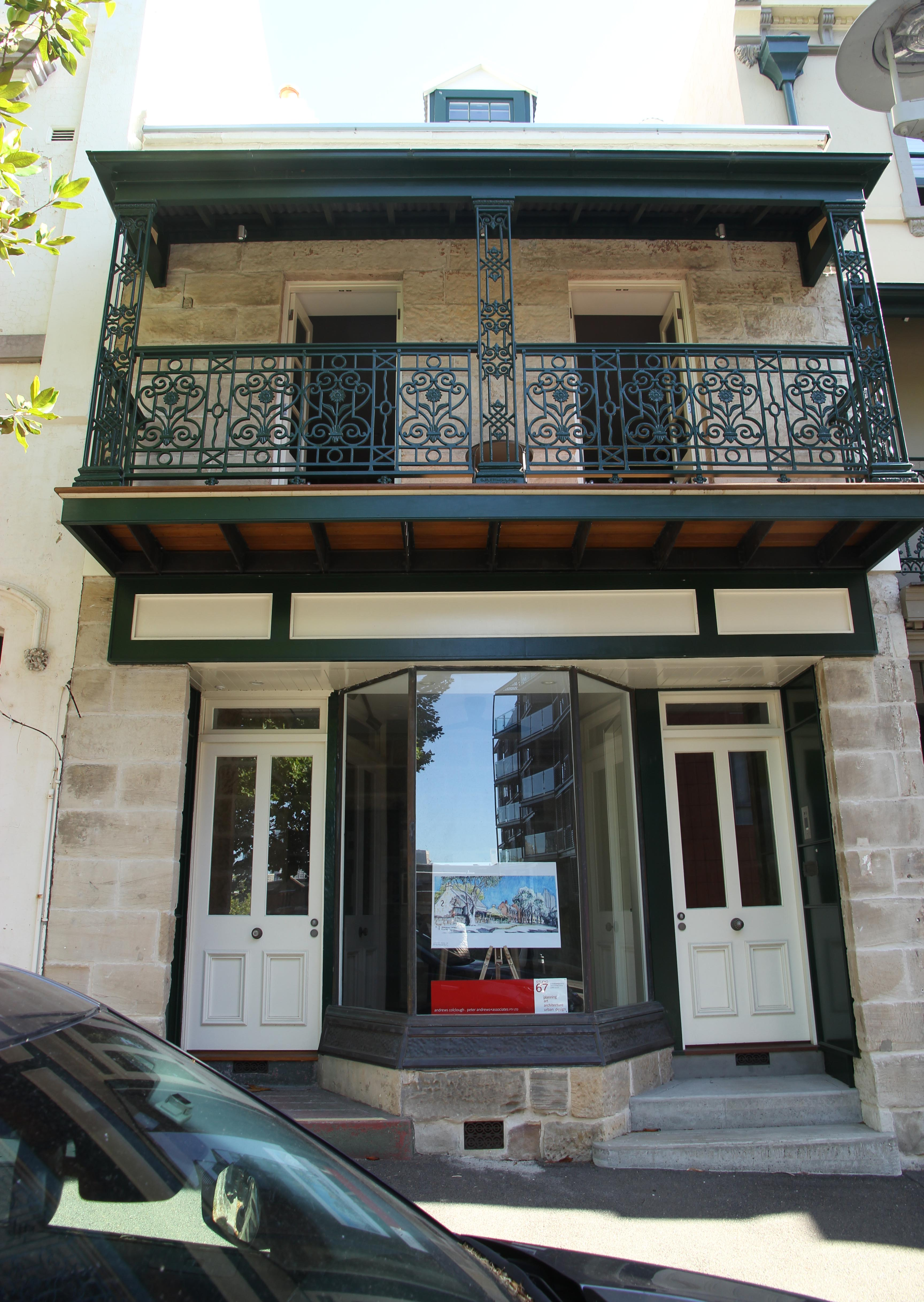
- 67 Windmill Street, pictured in 2019.

- Location within Sydney Location within Australia
- 33.8578°S 151.2053°E
- Location: 67 Windmill Street, Millers Point, City of Sydney, New South Wales, Australia

History
- Built: 1840s

Site notes
- Architectural style: Georgian

New South Wales Heritage Register
- Official name: Stone Shop
- Type: State heritage (built)
- Designated: 2 April 1999
- Reference no.: 860
- Type: historic site

67 Windmill Street, Millers Point is a heritage-listed shop with residence located at 67 Windmill Street, in the inner city Sydney suburb of Millers Point in the City of Sydney local government area of New South Wales, Australia. The property was added to the New South Wales State Heritage Register on 2 April 1999.

== History ==
Millers Point is one of the earliest areas of European settlement in Australia, and a focus for maritime activities. This shop was built c. 1840 and over time has had a number of uses.

== Description ==
Two-storey stone 1840s shop/residence of simple composition and detailing. Two sash windows on upper level, dormer window to attic. Storeys: Two; Construction: Painted stone walls, corrugated galvanised iron, painted timber joinery. Style: Georgian.

The external condition of the property is good.

=== Modifications and dates ===
External: Parapet capping repaired badly. Some joinery mortified.

== Heritage listing ==
As at 23 November 2000, 67 Windmill Street, Millers Point, an early nineteenth century shop, is representative of early commercial activity in the area, and is an important streetscape element.

It is part of the Millers Point Conservation Area, an intact residential and maritime precinct. It contains residential buildings and civic spaces dating from the 1830s and is an important example of 19th century adaptation of the landscape.

67 Windmill Street, Millers Point was listed on the New South Wales State Heritage Register on 2 April 1999.

== See also ==
- Australian non-residential architectural styles
- 65 Windmill Street
- 69 Windmill Street
