= 90–92 Kent Street, Millers Point =

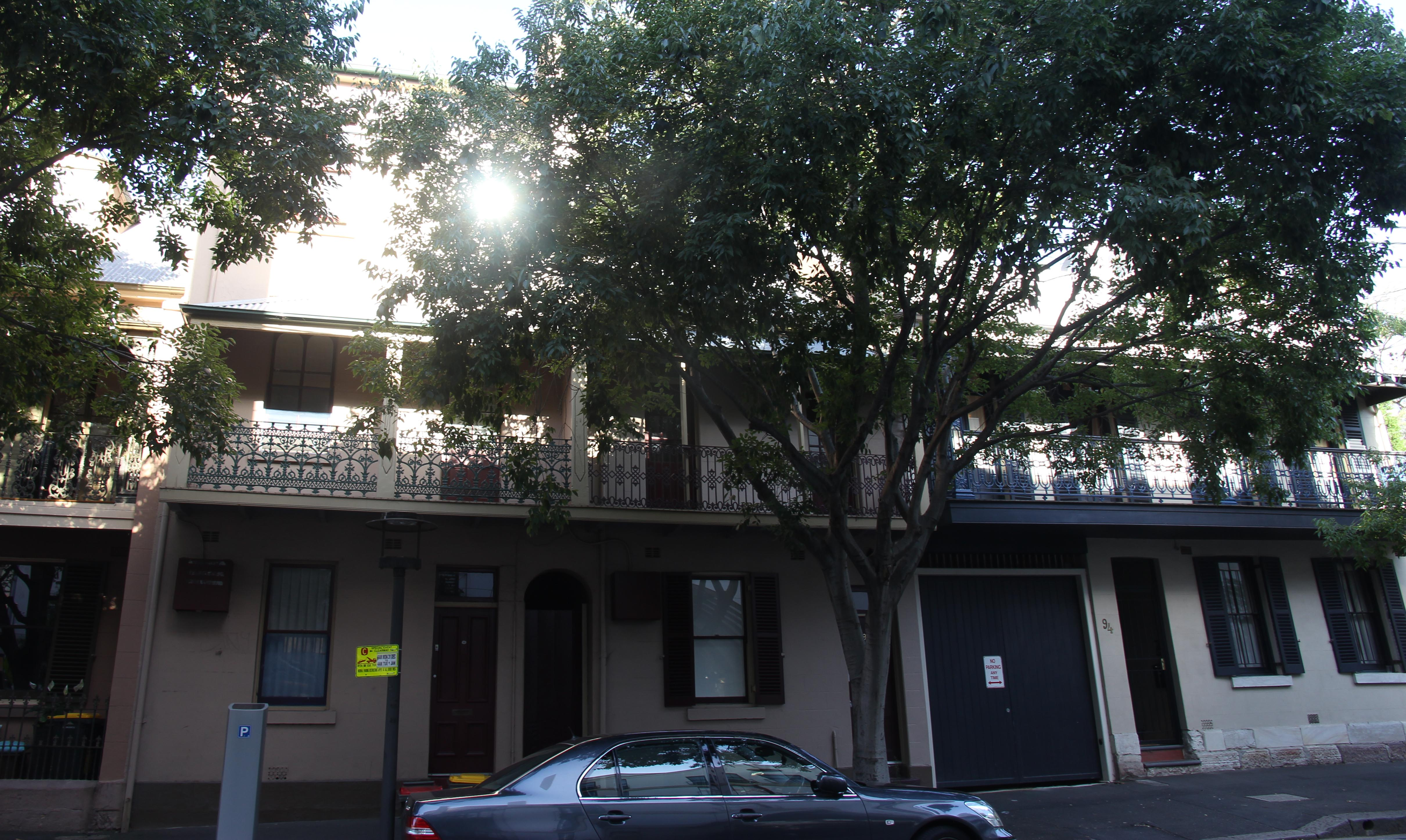
- 90–92 Kent Street (left) and Toxteth (right), pictured in 2019.

- Location within Sydney Location within Australia
- 33.8605°S 151.2039°E
- Location: 90, 92 Kent Street, Millers Point, City of Sydney, New South Wales, Australia

Site notes
- Architectural style: Victorian

New South Wales Heritage Register
- Official name: Terrace
- Type: State heritage (built)
- Designated: 2 April 1999
- Reference no.: 916
- Type: Terrace
- Category: Residential buildings (private)

90–92 Kent Street, Millers Point are heritage-listed terrace houses located at 90–92 Kent Street, Millers Point, City of Sydney, New South Wales, Australia. The property is owned by Department of Housing (State Government). It was added to the New South Wales State Heritage Register on 2 April 1999.

== History ==
Millers Point is one of the earliest areas of European settlement in Australia, and a focus for maritime activities. This Victorian terrace was originally one of a pair of two storey early Victorian terraces, this property has had a third storey of late Victorian character added. First tenanted by the NSW Department of Housing in 1982.

== Description ==
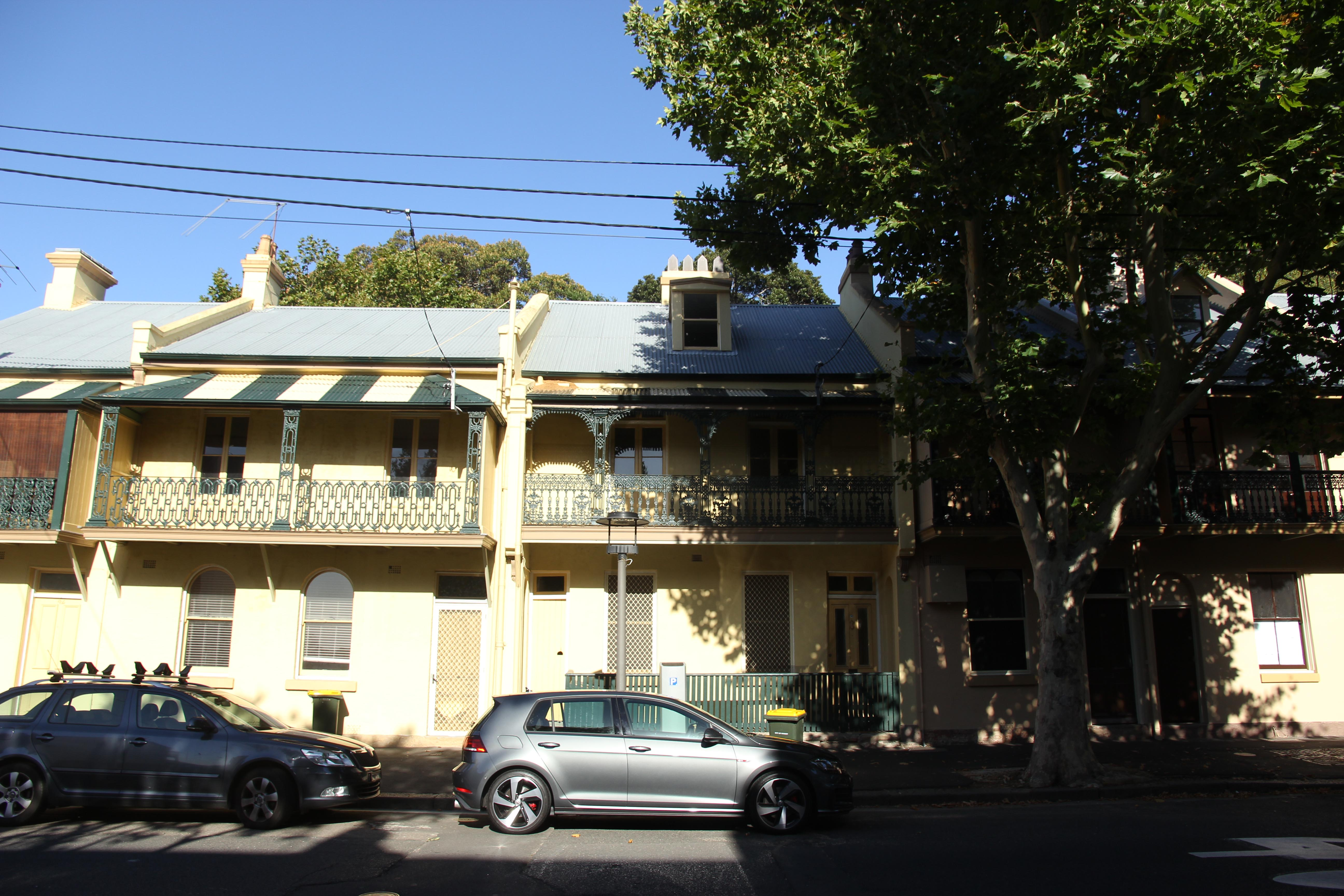
90-92 Kent Street, pictured at left in 2019.

An interesting three-storey early Victorian house with cantilevered balcony over the footpath and cast iron balustrade and timber columns. Between No. 92 and No. 90 there is a passageway to the rear. This residence has five bedrooms. Storeys: Two; Construction: Painted rendered masonry, corrugated galvanised iron roof, timber verandah, cast iron columns. Style: Victorian.

The external condition of the property is good.

=== Modifications and dates ===
External: Shutters removed. Balcony posts modified in late 19th century. Last inspected on 19 February 1995.

== Heritage listing ==
As at 23 November 2000, this early Victorian terrace was one of two, however, it has a late Victorian addition of a second storey. Also, it has a cantilevered balcony and passageway through to rear of property. This is an important streetscape element.

It is part of the Millers Point Conservation Area, an intact residential and maritime precinct. It contains residential buildings and civic spaces dating from the 1830s and is an important example of 19th century adaptation of the landscape.

90–92 Kent Street, Millers Point was listed on the New South Wales State Heritage Register on 2 April 1999.

== See also ==
- Australian residential architectural styles
- Blyth Terrace: 82, 84, 86, 88 Kent Street
- Toxteth: 94 Millers Point
