= Blyth Terrace =

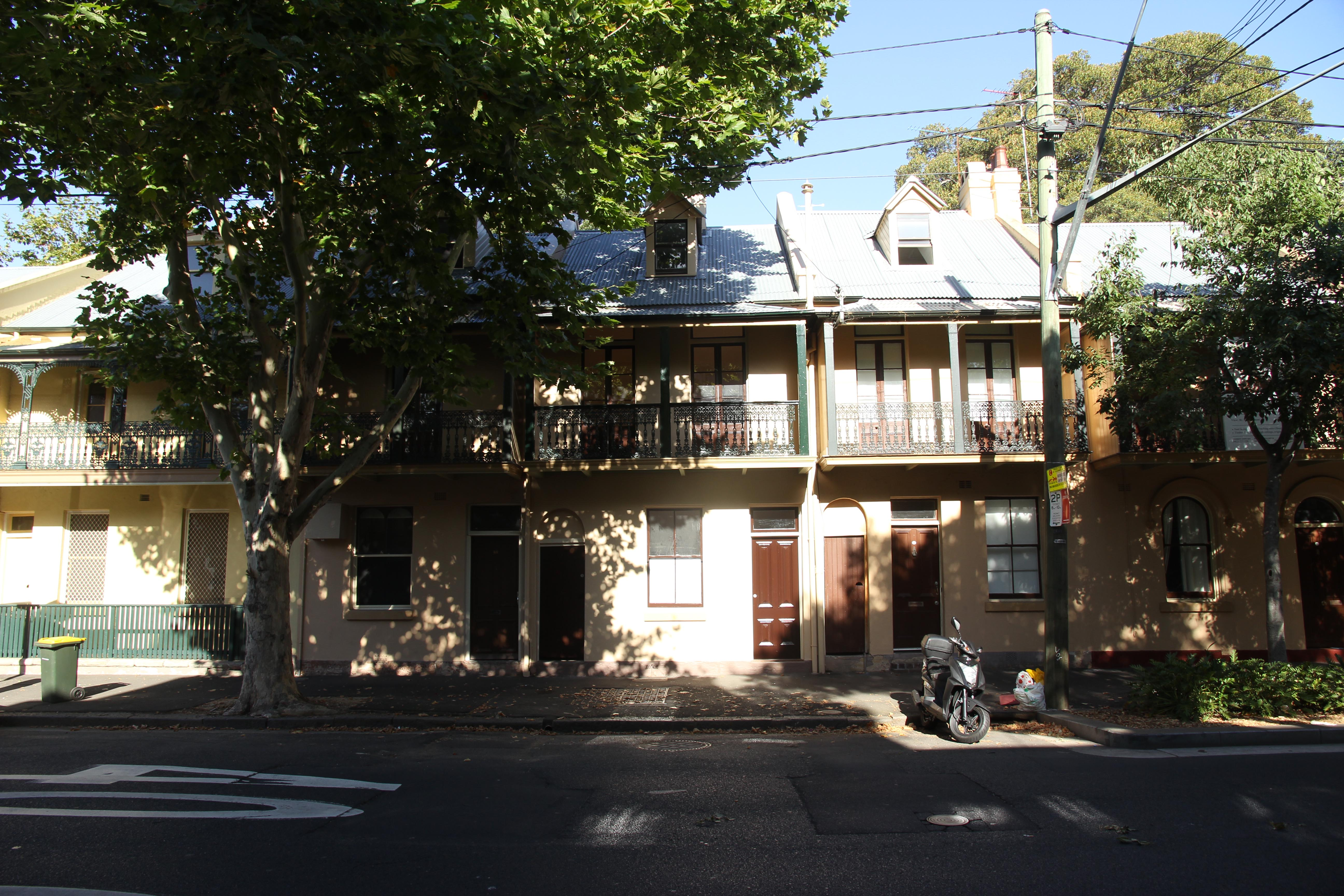
- Part of Blyth Terrace, at left, and 90-92 Kent Street, at left, pictured in 2019.

- Location within Sydney Location within Australia
- 33.8603°S 151.2039°E
- Location: 82, 84, 86, 88 Kent Street, Millers Point, City of Sydney, New South Wales, Australia

History
- Built: c. 1850s

Site notes
- Architectural style: Victorian Filigree

New South Wales Heritage Register
- Official name: Blyth Terrace
- Type: State heritage (built)
- Designated: 2 April 1999
- Reference no.: 839
- Type: Terrace
- Category: Residential buildings (private)

Blyth Terrace is a heritage-listed series of terrace houses located at 82–88 Kent Street, in the inner city Sydney suburb of Millers Point in the City of Sydney local government area of New South Wales, Australia. It is also known as AMA House. The property was added to the New South Wales State Heritage Register on 2 April 1999.

== History ==
Millers Point is one of the earliest areas of European settlement in Australia, and a focus for maritime activities. Terrace housing built during the 1850s. First tenanted by the NSW Department of Housing in 1982.

== Description ==
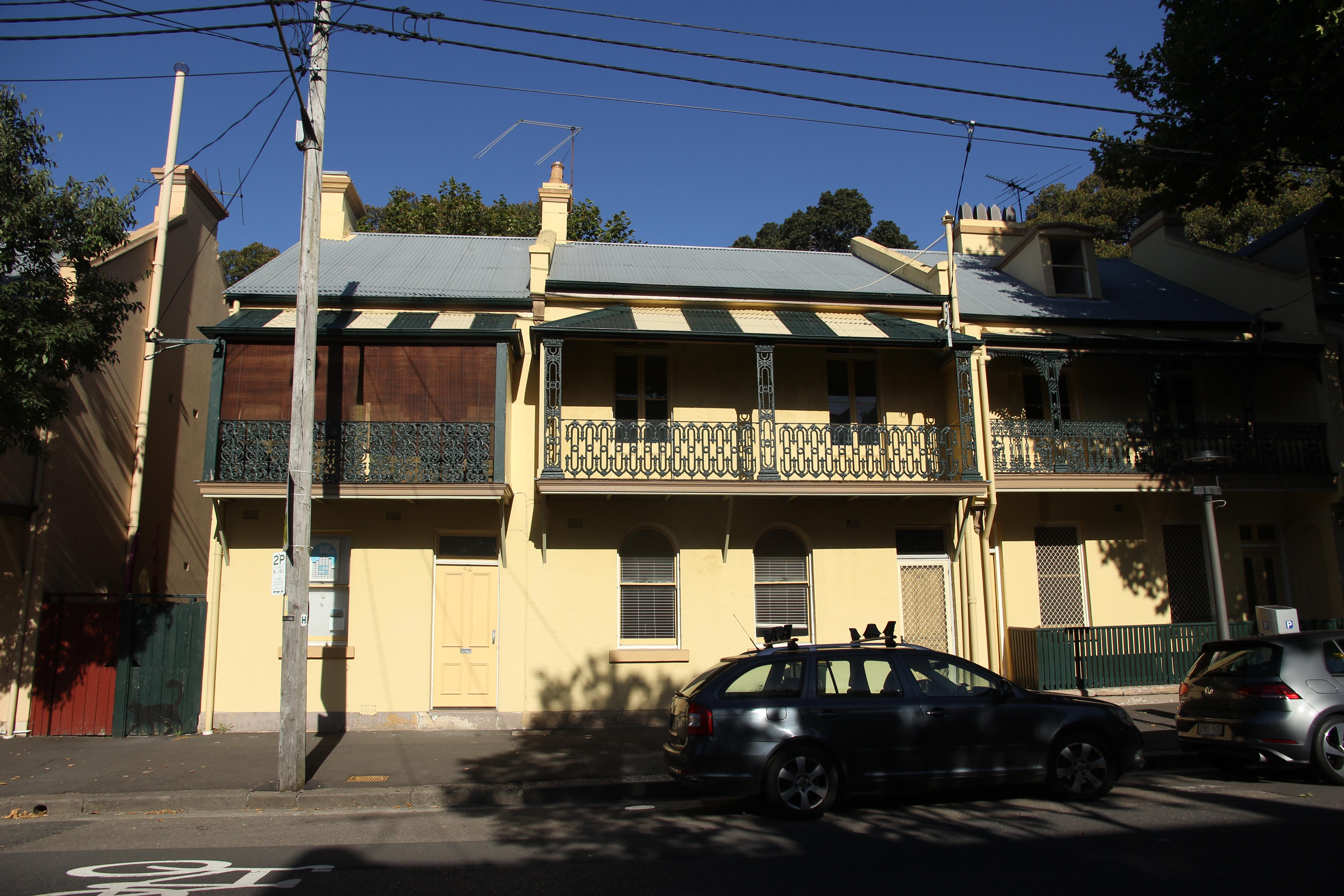
82–86 Kent Street, pictured in 2019. 88 Kent Street is obscured, at far right.

Early Victorian, two-storey terrace with four bedrooms, sleep-out and attic. Features include a concave corrugated iron verandah painted in wide stripes, iron lace balcony and column supports and spear fence at ground level. Ground floor has a double hung window and front door with fanlight above. Upper level has two french doors opening onto balcony. Shutters on all windows. Storeys: Two; Construction: Painted rendered masonry, corrugated galvanised iron roof. Timber verandah with iron lace and balcony columns. Spear fence balustrading at ground level. Style: Victorian Filigree.

The external condition of the property is good.

=== Modifications and dates ===
External: Some iron columns removed. Last inspected: 19 February 1995.

== Heritage listing ==
As at 23 November 2000, this 1850s terrace forms part of a cohesive streetscape element.

It is part of the Millers Point Conservation Area, an intact residential and maritime precinct. It contains residential buildings and civic spaces dating from the 1830s and is an important example of C19th adaptation of the landscape.

Blyth Terrace was listed on the New South Wales State Heritage Register on 2 April 1999.

== See also ==
- Australian residential architectural styles
- AMA House, Sydney
- 90–92 Kent Street
