= Toxteth, Millers Point =

Toxteth
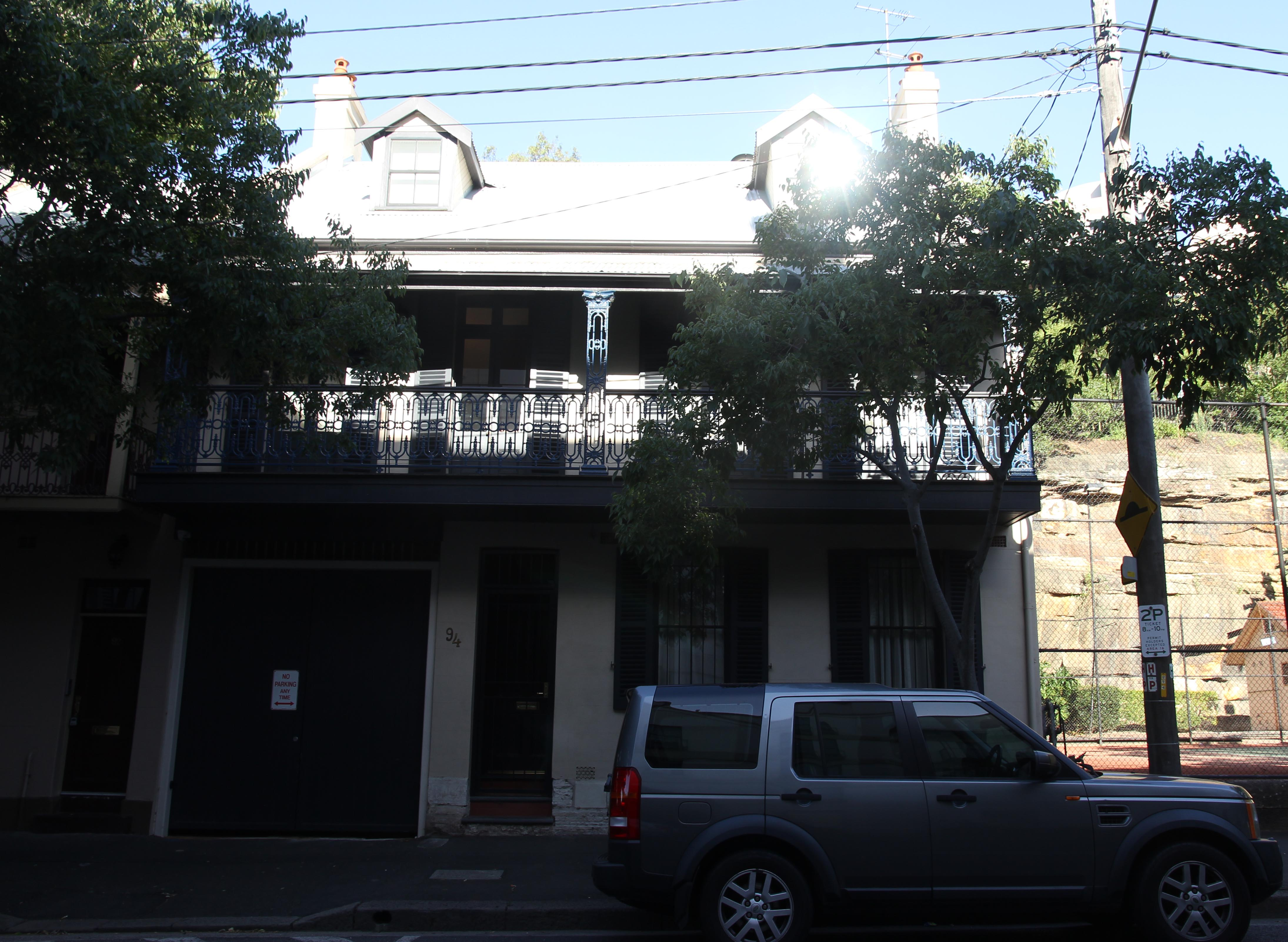
- Toxteth, pictured in 2019

- Location of Toxteth in the Sydney central business district Toxteth, Millers Point (Australia)
- 33°51′38″S 151°12′14″E
- Location: 94 Kent Street, Millers Point, New South Wales, Australia

History
- Built: c. 1868
- Built for: David Brown

Site notes
- Architectural style: Colonial Georgian Regency

New South Wales Heritage Register
- Official name: Toxteth
- Type: State heritage (built)
- Designated: 2 April 1999
- Reference no.: 928
- Type: Terrace
- Category: Residential buildings (private)

Toxteth is a heritage-listed residence located at 94 Kent Street, in the inner city Sydney suburb of Millers Point, New South Wales, Australia. It was added to the New South Wales State Heritage Register on 2 April 1999.

== History ==
No. 94 Kent Street is located on the site of a former quarry which ran the length of Kent Street from Argyle Street to King Street. The house was built c. 1868 for David Brown, a merchant, following his purchase of the property in the same year. He called the house Kilrea House, likely after the city of Kilrea in Ireland, where his wife was born, Brown sold the building to Frederick Gibbons in 1876.

Gibbons then sold the property to William Alexander Curphey, a mariner, in 1885, who transferred the property into his second wife's name in 1891. Curphey died in 1893. By 1885, the site included an outbuilding connected to the main house by a covered way containing the kitchen, laundry, storeroom and a two-storey coach house and stables with hay loft and men's room over. The coach house and stables were located at the east of the site, adjacent to the exposed cliff face with a court year are to the centre and northern side of the site.

The house obtained the name of Toxteth in the late 19th century.

The property was resumed by the Sydney Harbour Trust c. 1901. In 1984 the property was transferred to the Housing Commission of NSW and in 1986 refurbishment, maintenance and adaptation works were undertaken. This resulted in the conversion of the place from a single residence to a boarding house with communal spaces to the rear. The earlier rear wing and stables were demolished to provide a new kitchen area, bathrooms and bedroom. The rear first floor balcony was replaced with a large volume to provide a living dining space including the kitchen. The rear dormer windows were constructed and the front dormer windows were altered.

It was sold in September 2011.

== Description ==
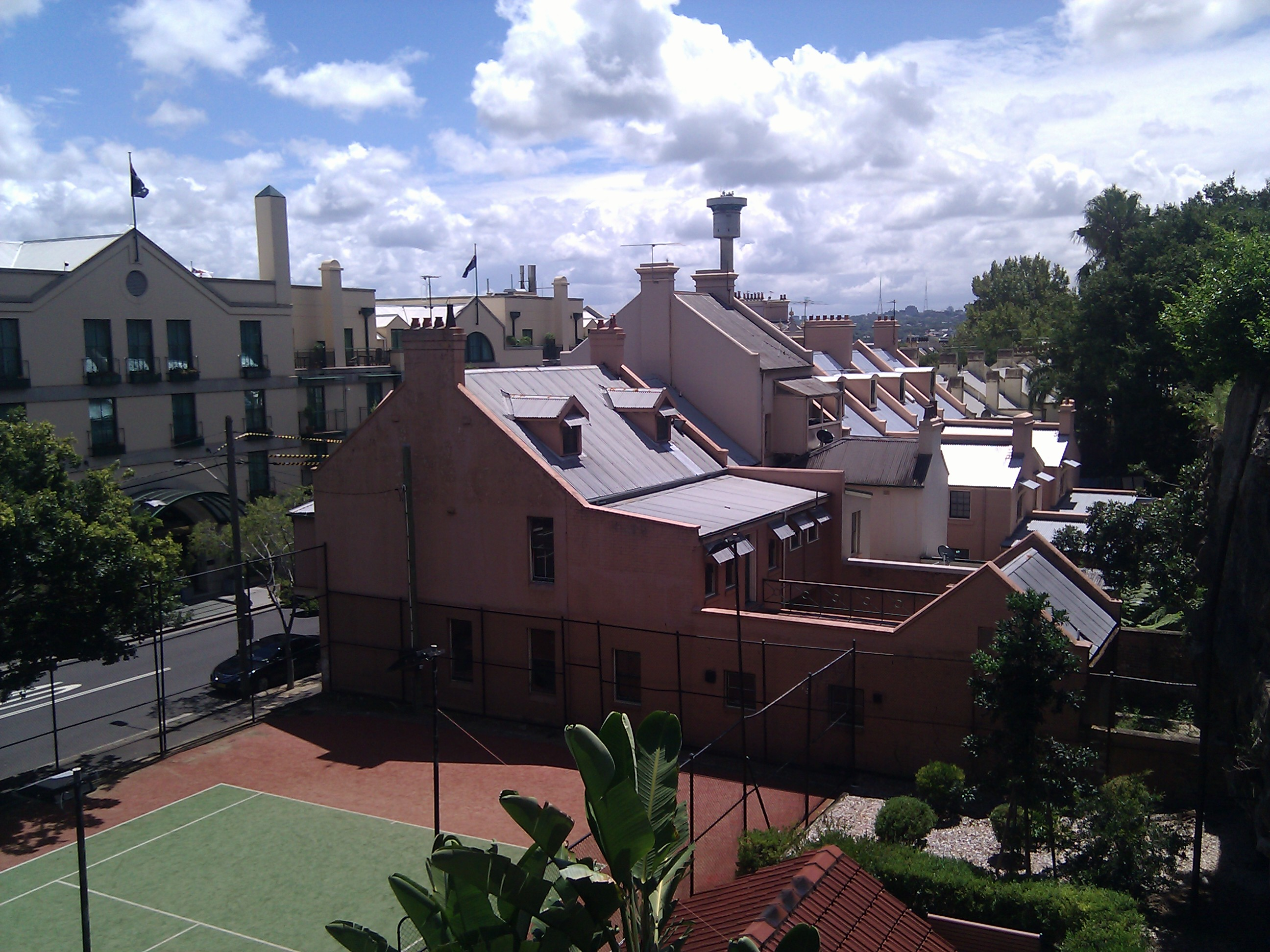
Toxteth, pictured in 2012, as viewed from Agar Steps.

94 Kent Street, known as Toxteth, is a two-storey Colonial Georgian Regency style townhouse with attic, and a two-storey rear skillion wing and single storey rear wing. The main part of the building is of rendered brickwork on a sandstone base with timber joinery and doors. There is a front cantilevered balcony with cast iron filigree detailing. The main roof, with side gables, features galvanised steel corrugated roofing, two dormers at both the front rear, and painted rendered chimneys with terracotta chimney pots. There is a covered carriageway on the northern side of the building.

At the rear is a two-storey skillion section. This joins a single storey rear wing with roofed terrace and a single storey section with gabled roof that dates from the 1980s.

Internally the main part of the building was renovated in the 1980s for a rooming house which included refurbishment of the subfloors, installation of 1980s reproduction joinery and ceilings, and new partitioning. Surviving early fabric includes:

- the original stair has been largely retained but includes some new banisters
- timber fireplace surround in room 1.2 and room 2.8 including cast ion grate and stone hearth
- ground floor front façade windows
- entrance lobby ceilings and slate threshold, marble floor
- archway at foot of stair with corner and staff bead
- front door with the name Toxteth etched in fanlight
- painted plaster walls

== Significance ==
Toxteth is historically significant for its long term use as a single residence, owned and occupied by members of the upper middle class with strong associations with the burgeoning merchant and maritime industries of Colonial Sydney and as one to the earliest buildings to be constructed on the former Kent Street stone quarry.

As home to a continuous succession of Sydney merchants, mariners and businessmen from its construction in 1869, the place is associated with various prominent individuals of the time, including merchant David Brown, merchant/mariner Frederick Gibbins, mariners William Curphey and Hermann "Harry" Wulf, merchant Charles Isles and notable builder, businessman and local alderman Alexander Dean, who possibly built Toxteth.

Toxteth is of aesthetic significance as a Colonial Georgian Regency style town house, which has undergone alterations in the 20th century, and which contributes to the 19th century character of the northern Kent Street streetscape and the surrounding precinct of Millers Point. Its scale and design demonstrates the early development of Kent Street as a residential neighbourhood in the mid-late ninetieth century.

The house is also significant for its associations with the provision of low cost government housing and accommodation for local maritime workers.

== Heritage listing ==
This large Victorian house is an important streetscape element. It has a cantilevered balcony and carriageway through to rear of property.

It is part of the Millers Point Conservation Area, an intact residential and maritime precinct. It contains residential buildings and civic spaces dating from the 1830s and is an important example of nineteenth-century adaptation of the landscape.

Toxteth was listed on the New South Wales State Heritage Register on 2 April 1999.

== See also ==
- Australian residential architectural styles
