= Filigree architecture =

Australian architectural style

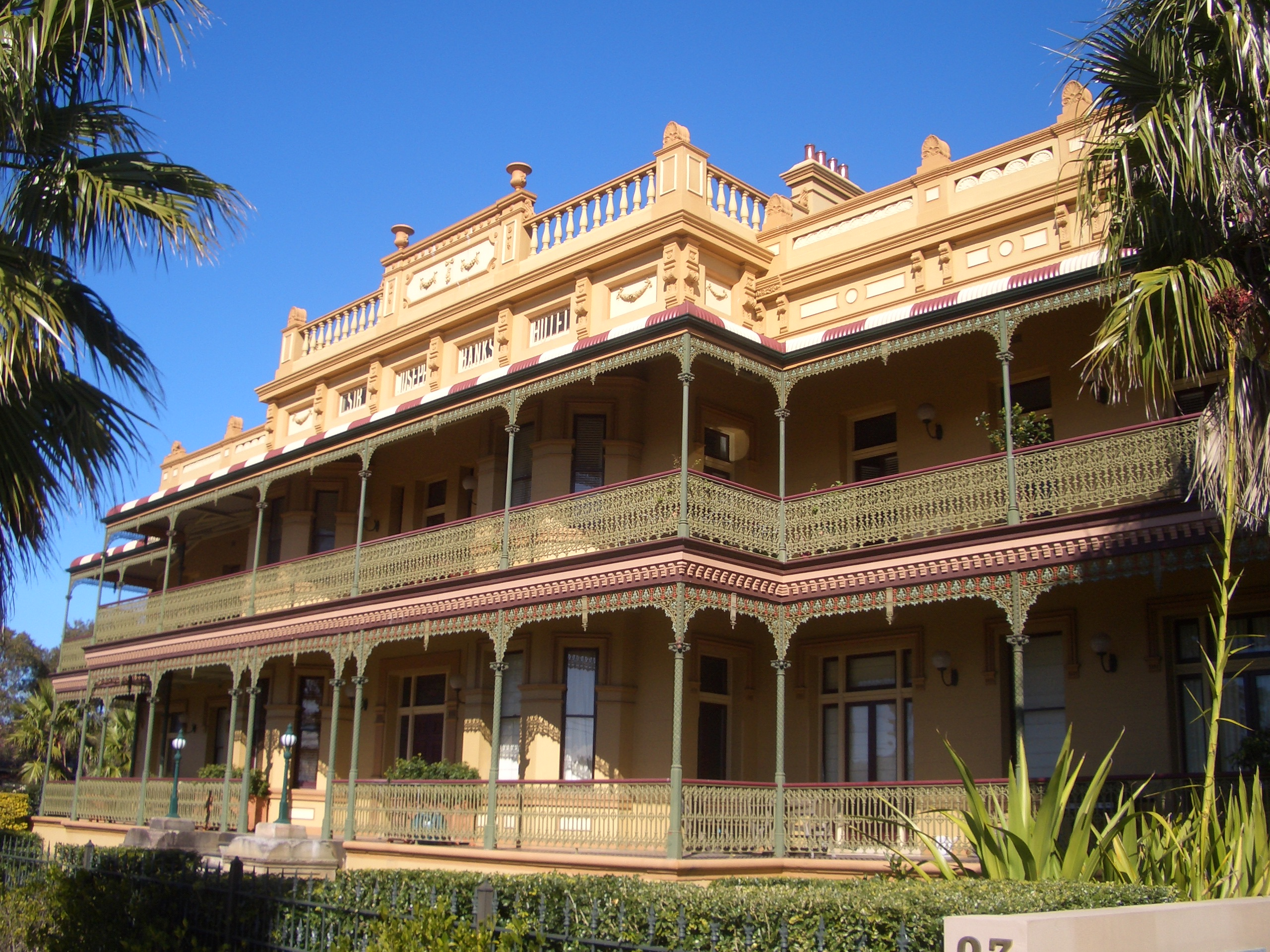
Old Sir Joseph Banks Hotel, Botany (c. 1874)

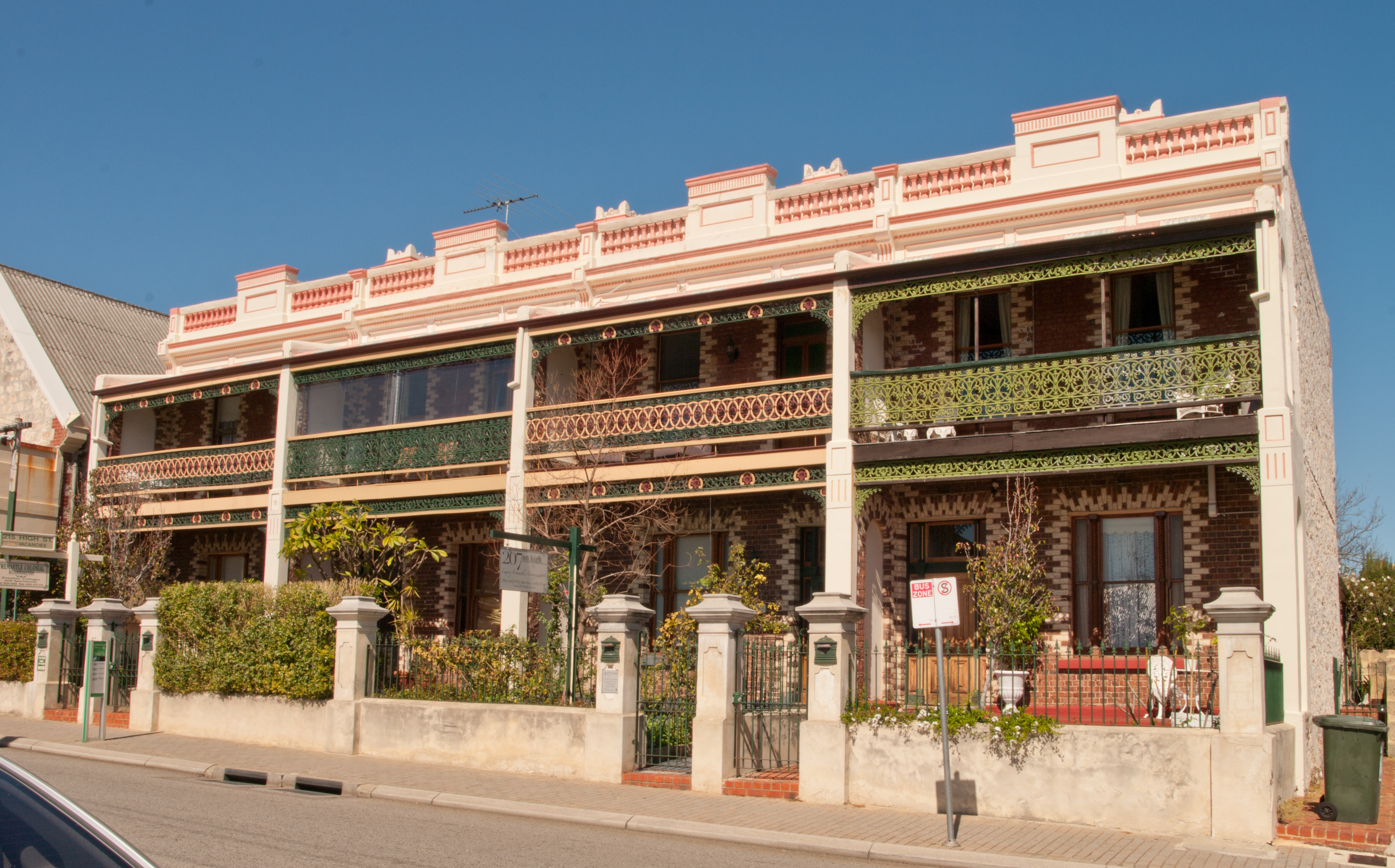
Ardmore terrace houses, Fremantle (c. 1898)

Filigree architecture is a modern term given to a phase in the history of Australian architecture. The phase was an embellishment of the "Australian verandah tradition", where the verandah evolved from its functional usages to become highly ornamental.

The filigree style was a vernacular tradition of buildings possessing prominent verandahs that screened the facade, cloaking the exterior in an ornamental veil that obscured the rest of building. On filigree style buildings, the verandah was the dominant visual element. The term "filigree" refers to the intricate texture of this verandah screen, which was often perforated to let air and light pass through, creating dazzling displays of shadows.

In the Victorian era, the style exploded into popularity. Double- and triple-storey verandahs lined the main streets, with some rare examples reaching up to four storeys. Victorian Filigree style verandahs were made almost exclusively from cast iron, and their delicate appearance gave rise to the term cast iron lacework. In the Federation era, the style evolved into the Federation Filigree style, when timber eclipsed cast iron as the predominant material of choice and the shape and form of the verandah became more novel.

The style was mainly popularised by speculative builders, but it did not have a class consciousness, being used both on humble workers cottage developments and grand mansions, as well as by prominent commercial architects such as Richard Gailey and Andrea Stombuco. Neither was it reserved for a single setting, being used on domestic, commercial and governmental buildings, becoming particularly well associated with Australian terrace houses and pub verandahs.

These strong associations have led to the filigree style being "regarded as distinctly Australian." While ornamental cast iron verandahs can be found elsewhere in the world, Australia possesses a unique interpretation of the design and form of this style, as well as a prevalence unseen elsewhere.

== Terminology History ==
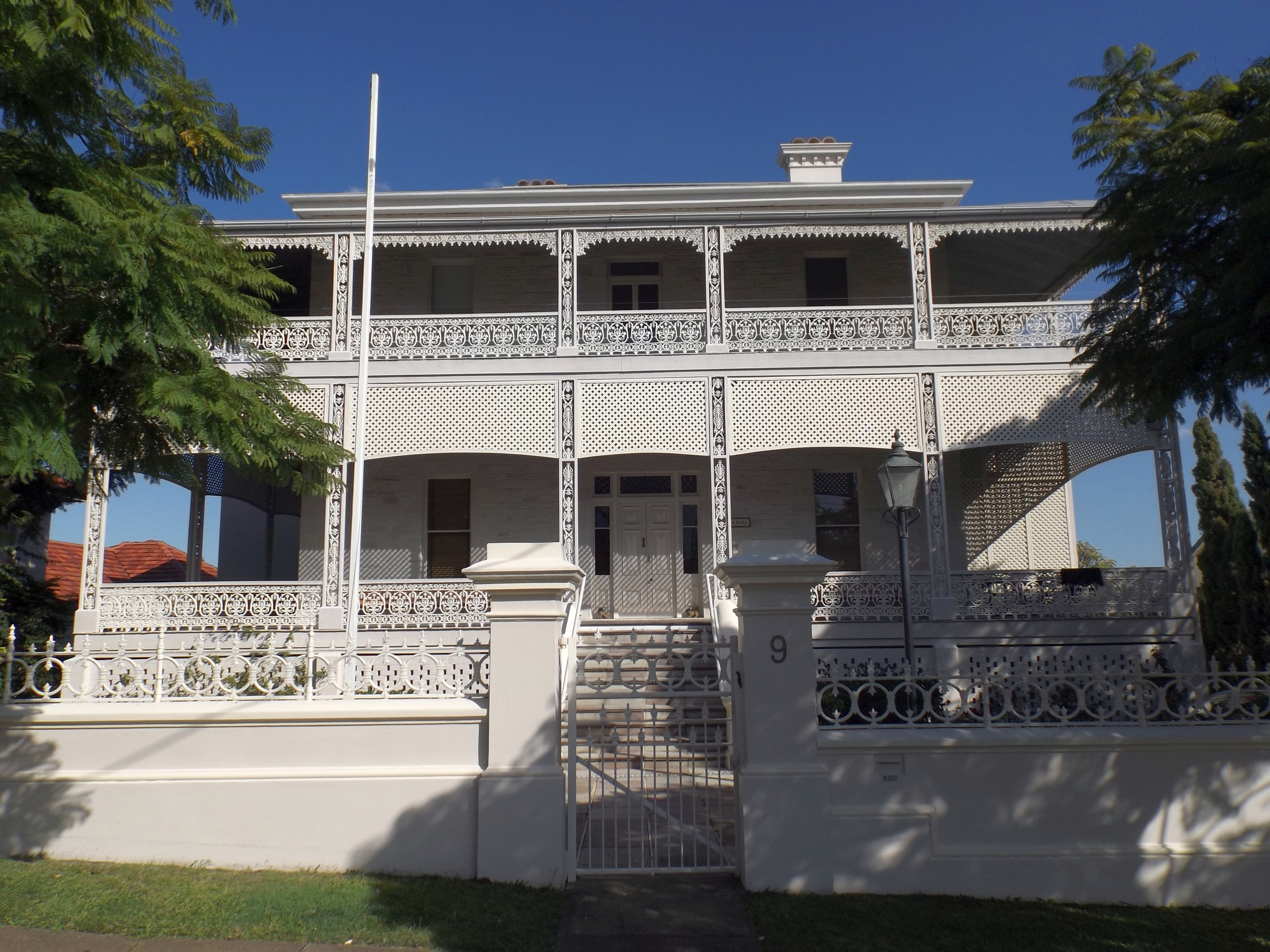
Palma Rosa, Hamilton (1887), was proposed by Apperly, Irving, & Reynolds as an example of a building whose defining feature is its verandah screen.

"Filigree" was first proposed as a style descriptor by architectural historian Richard Apperly, and was popularised in A Pictorial Guide to Identifying Australian Architecture: Styles and Terms from 1788 to the Present (1989) by Richard Apperly, Robert Irving & Peter Reynolds. The book attempted to establish a series of guidelines governing Australian architectural styles, splitting them into six distinct, chronological eras: Old Colonial, Victorian, Federation, Inter-War, Post-War and late-twentieth-century.

A particular focus of Apperly, Irving, & Reynolds was recognising unique, Australian trends that had so far been unrecognised in academia. They coined the term "filigree" to describe the prevalence of buildings possessing prominent verandah and balcony structures that dominate the facade, hiding the building's external walls behind an intricately textured verandah screen that subsumed the building. The term "filigree" refers to the intricate texture of the balustrades, columns, brackets and friezes that make up that verandah screen, which was often perforated to let air and light pass through. This lacy, filigree screen was designed to stand dominant of the main building, creating an in-between space that was both public and private.

Apperly, Irving, & Reynolds divided Filigree architecture into two main phases. Victorian Filigree described architecture with a visually dominant verandah or balcony constructed during the Victorian era (c. 1840 – c. 1900). The primary verandah construction material in this era was cast iron, often referred to as cast iron lacework. Federation Filigree describes the continuation of this verandah tradition into the Federation era (c. 1890 – c. 1920. In this period, cast iron (though still in usage) was eclipsed by the demand for novel, naturalised materials such as timber and hand-worked wrought iron.

Verandah structures and decorative cast iron were common components of Victorian and Federation architecture, and the prevalence of these components on Italianate, Gothic and Second Empire styled buildings indicates their popularity at the time. However, their presence did not necessarily characterise a building as being of the filigree style, this term being reserved for buildings whereby the lacework verandah is the main external design feature.

== Origins ==
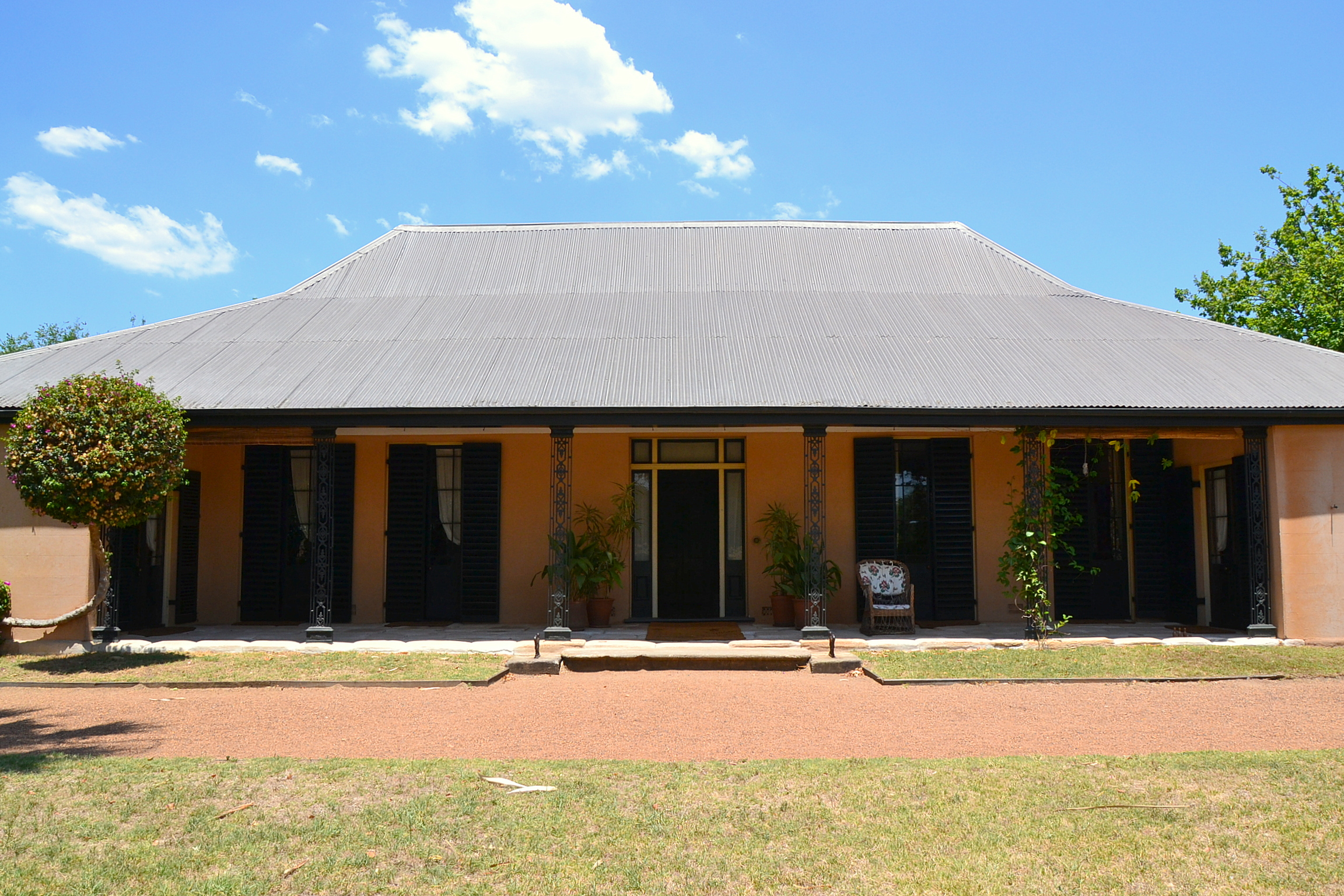
Elizabeth Farm, Parramatta (1793). Single-storey bungalow with verandah shading against the northern sun. Openwork columns probably added c. 1865 during repairs.

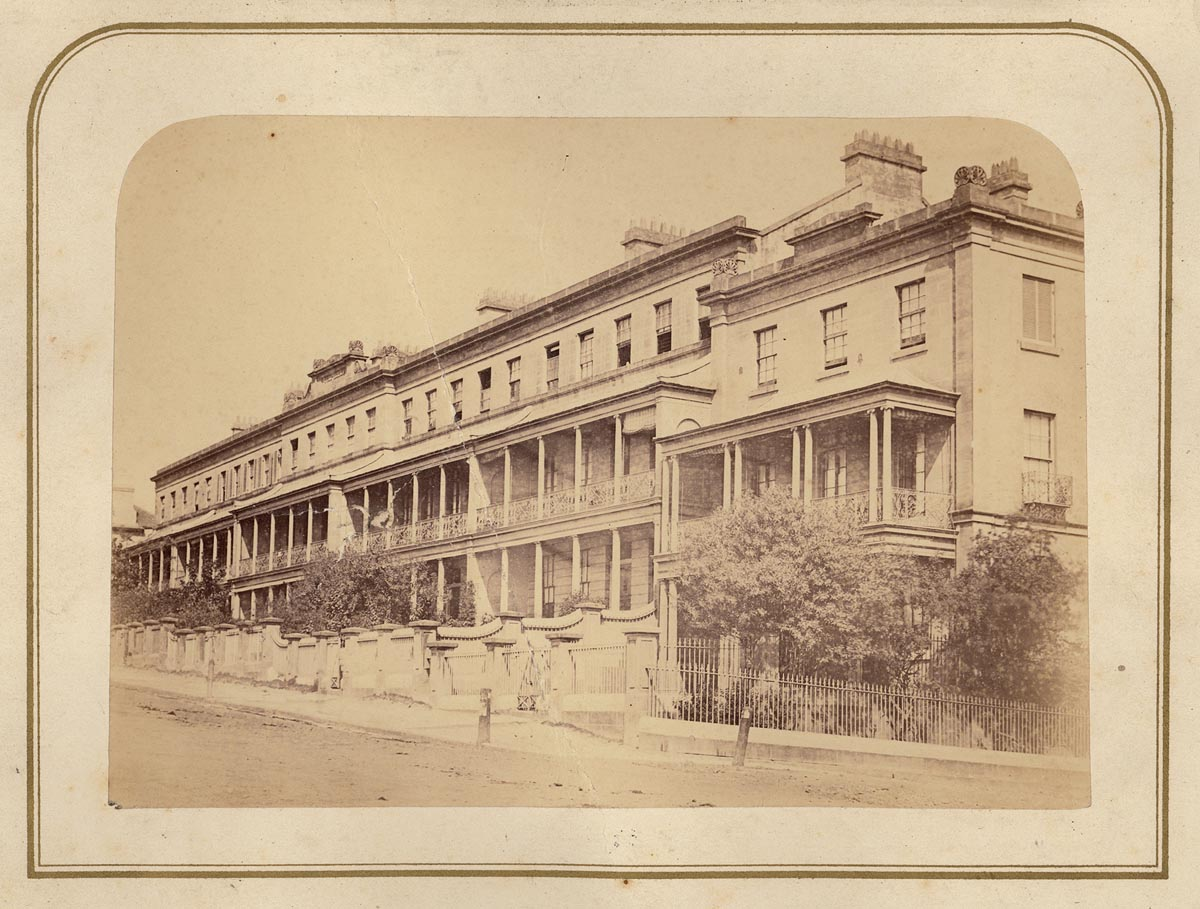
Lyons Terrace, Hyde Park (1841)

The first verandah structures built by European settlers were bungalow-type buildings perhaps inspired by examples found in other parts of the British Empire through the connection of military officers who had served in India. The Lieutenant Governor Major Francis Grose had served in North America during the War of Independence, and likely would have encountered verandahs during his time there. In 1793, Grose added a verandah to the frontage of the house in which he was residing. In 1794, during Grose's tenure as Lieutenant Governor, a single storey verandah was added along the front of Government House, and in 1802 it was extended along the side of the new eastern additions. Captain John Macarthur and his wife Elizabeth built their farmhouse at Parramatta in 1793 with a verandah running along the northern aspect overlooking the river. The verandah in this early period often acted as an external passageway, serving as the access point to rooms which did not connect to each other internally. Most crucially, verandahs also served to protect against harsh sun and torrential rain.

The wide verandahs afford a cool shelter from the intense heat of the meridian sun, and give the cottages an air of shady retirement, which has its own peculiar elegance.

— Joseph Fowles, Sydney in 1848

Early double-storey verandahs were often constructed out of timber and stone, such as the Rum Hospital (c. 1810 – c. 1816), which ran in a long ribbon along a prominent ridgeline on the eastern fringe of Sydney. Another prominent early example of the style was the quadruple-storeyed Royal Hotel on George Street, Sydney (c. 1840), whose heavy, towering appearance was much remarked upon by visitors. In 1841, Samuel Lyons, a successful auctioneer and former convict, built Lyons Terrace overlooking Hyde Park. It was one of the first terraces which had raised party walls that projected above the roofline, as required by the Building Act 1837, which had been passed by the Legislative Assembly of New South Wales three years earlier. Lyons Terrace was three storeys, with a long double-storey verandah draped in cast ironwork running along the breadth of it. It was a relatively large building in Sydney for its time, and it obviously had an effect on the young city. It was repeatedly painted and photographed by locals and visitors alike, and curiously, time and time again it is marked in maps of the city, as if considered a landmark. The double-storey verandah of Como House, South Yarra (1847), is of unusual design, consisting of spiked fence railings. On Strickland House, Vaucluse (c. 1856 – c. 1858), reputedly designed by John Frederick Hilly, a masonry colonnade of Doric columns wraps around the lower level, while the upper level balcony features cast iron railings and Sydney-style cast iron openwork columns.

== Victorian Filigree ==
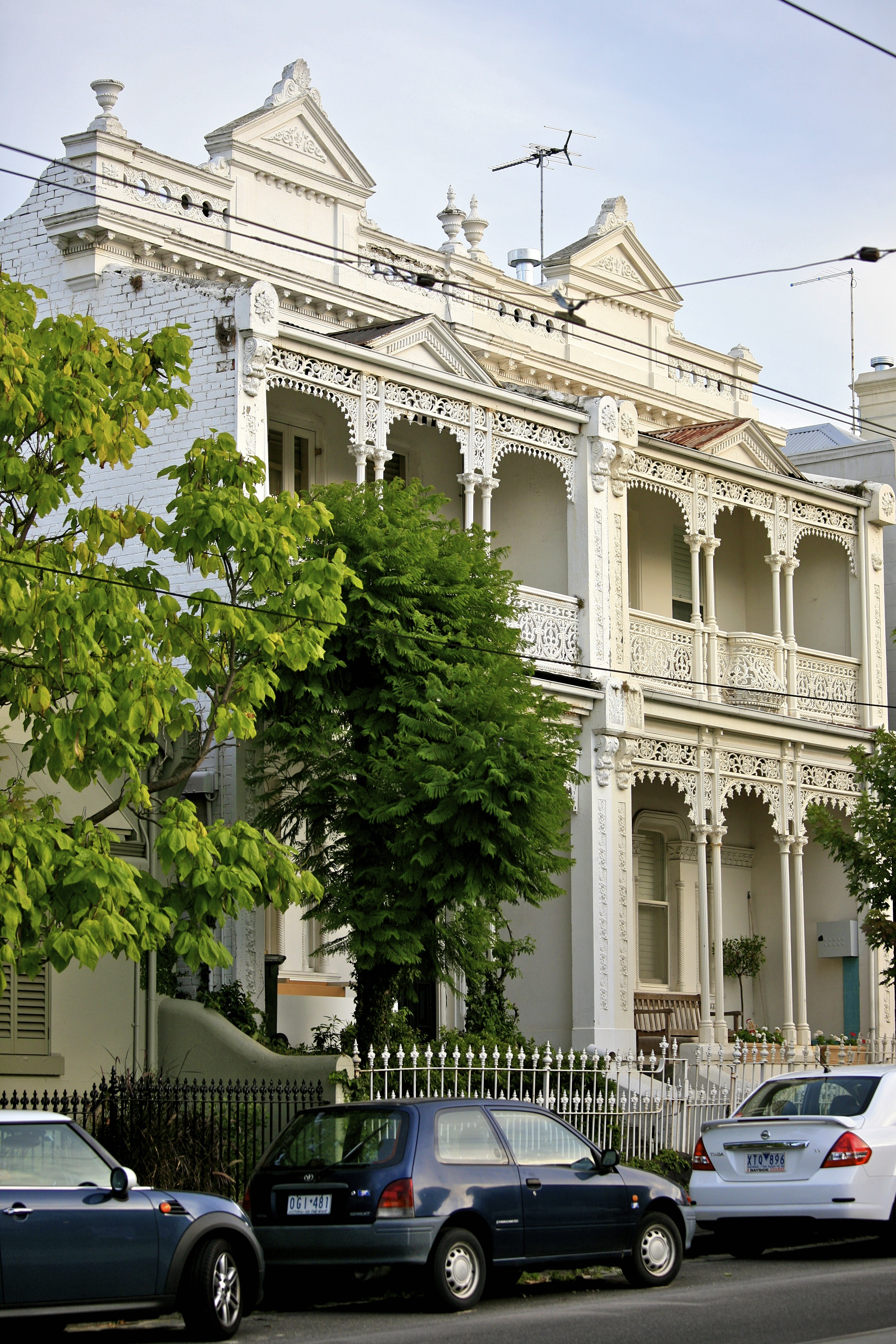
Terrace pair, South Yarra (1890-91) with specially cast "opera-box" balconies.

Starting with the period of the gold rushes of New South Wales and Victoria, the economy entered into a boom period which lasted until the 1890s. During this time, and often at the expense of the original Aboriginal inhabitants, European-Australians prospered. With this prosperity came a growing demand for ornate styles of architecture, and this boom-time optimism found its physical expression in florid configurations of cast iron lacework decorating the facades of opulent buildings.

Cast iron was not a new material, but technological advances in its production meant that it could now reach a mass market. These lacy filigree screens were at first simple; on Lyons Terrace only the balustrade was made from cast iron lacework, but the style eventually developed to include brackets, friezes, fringes and sometimes even double-friezes. Some examples in East Melbourne show the change in materials over time: Burlington Terrace, East Melbourne (c. 1867), designed by Charles Webb, features a cast iron balustrade with timber brackets and columns; Lawson Terrace, East Melbourne (c. 1871), features cast iron balustrade and key-frieze, with timber columns and brackets; and Hepburn Terrace, East Melbourne (c. 1878), features a balustrade, frieze, brackets and columns all made from ornamental cast iron.

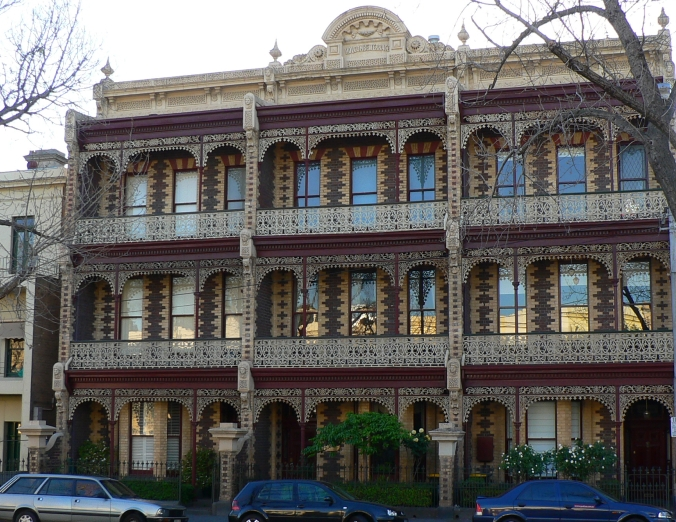
Holcombe Terrace, Carlton (1884)

The basic silhouette of Lyons Terrace (three storeys with a two-storey verandah) was incredibly influential and copied repeatedly by terrace rows around the country, such as Fitzroy Terrace, East Melbourne (c. 1855); Carlton Terrace, Wynyard (c. 1864); Denver Terrace, Carlton (c. 1866); Carlingford Terrace, Surry Hills (c. 1868 – c. 69); Tasma Terrace, East Melbourne (c. 1879); Lawrenny Terrace, Surry Hills (c. 1882); Hughenden Terrace, Petersham (1884); and Herberto Terrace, Glebe (1885). However, not all multi-storey terraces followed the Lyons silhouette. Holcombe Terrace, Carlton (1884), designed by Norman Hitchcock, is a three-storey terrace draped in a matching three-storey veil of lacework. Its polychrome brick facade shimmers underneath the cast ironwork verandah, and the lacework has been painted in cream and maroon to mirror the brickwork, creating a blur of colour that astonishes onlookers. Other notable, still-standing terraces with triple-storey verandahs include Marine Terrace, Grange Beach (1884); Waverly Terrace, Melbourne (1886); and the singular terrace houses Katoomba House, Millers Point (c. 1875 – c. 1886); Moira, Paddington (c. 1890); and Bundarra, Surry Hills (c. 1891). The four-storey Milton Terrace, Millers Point (1880-82), features three levels above ground and a basement level below. Perhaps one of the finest terrace rows in Sydney is the four-storey Brent Terrace, Elizabeth Bay (c. 1897). Praised for its "florid ornateness", this magnificent row of eight features three levels of matching cast iron lace from the foundry of Dash & Wise.

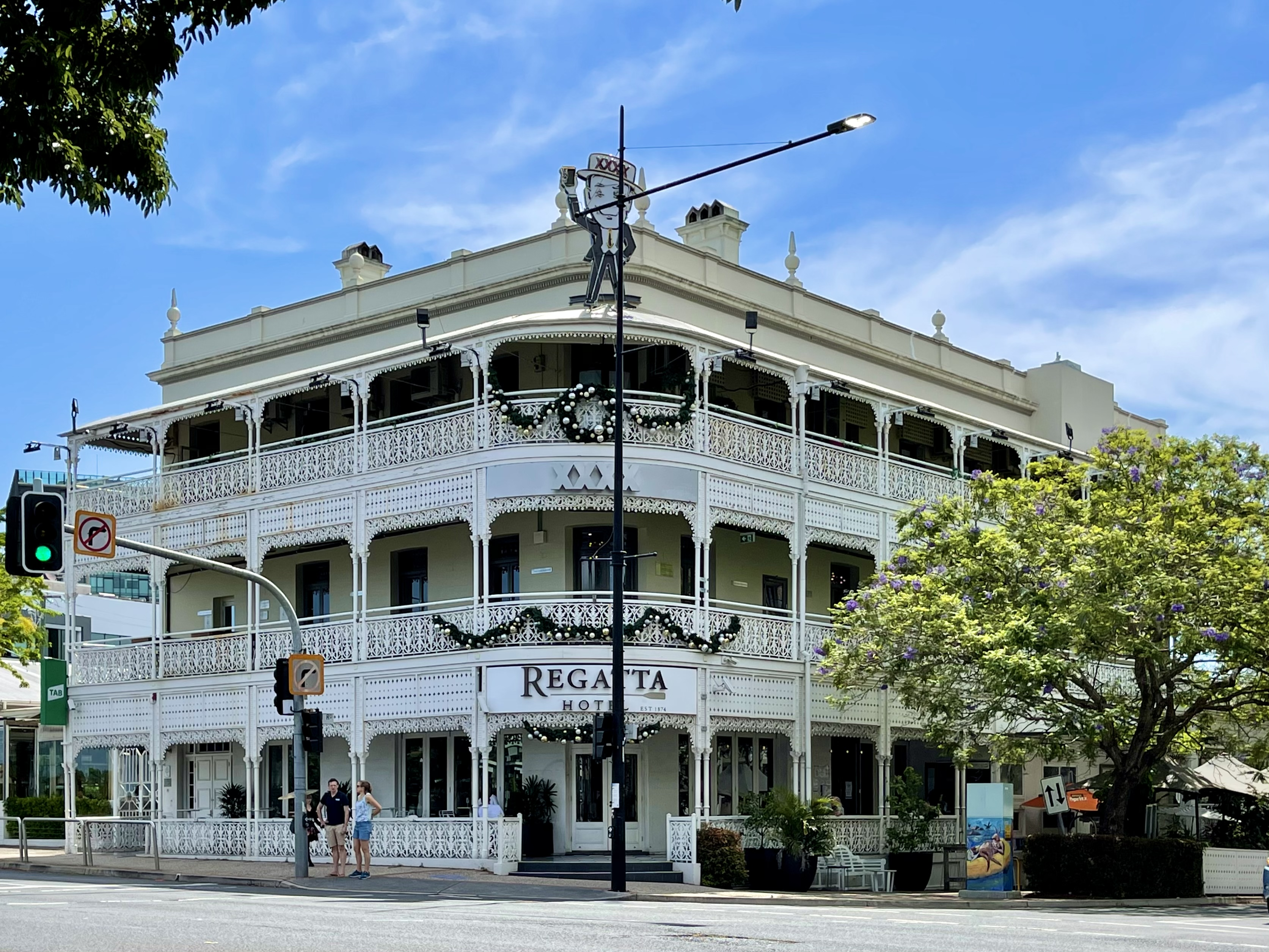
Regatta Hotel, Toowong (1886); architect Richard Gailey

In this era, the Filigree style became well associated with hotels and pubs. Verandahs were a space that was both public and private, and encouraged shady relaxation for its visitors, thus being immensely suited for hotels. Initially, timber verandahs were employed. Later, cast iron started to make an appearance. On the double-storey verandah of the Royal Hotel, Hill End (c. 1869-75), a cast iron balustrade graces the upper level, with the roof being held up by Sydney-style openwork columns. The Regatta Hotel, Toowong (1886), presents a three-layered screen of filigree to onlookers. Situated overlooking the Brisbane River, the hotel makes great use of its assets, and patrons can often be seen partying in the cool tropical air on its verandahs. The Regatta was designed by architect Richard Gailey, who practiced extensively in the Filigree style. Other triple-storey pubs designed by Gailey include the Kangaroo Point Hotel, Kangaroo Point (1886); Empire Hotel, Fortitude Valley (1888); Prince Consort Hotel, Fortitude Valley (1888); as well as the double-storey villa Moorlands, Auchenflower (1892). The triple-storey verandah of the Kangaroo Point Hotel was removed in 1924, when Filigree style verandahs were falling out of fashion, but was re-added during a restoration in 1994. Most pub verandahs sported the same, stock-standard patterns as other buildings, but an exception is the triple-storey verandah of the Royal Hotel, Bathurst (c. 1880), whose custom-cast ironwork is emblazoned with its initial "R".

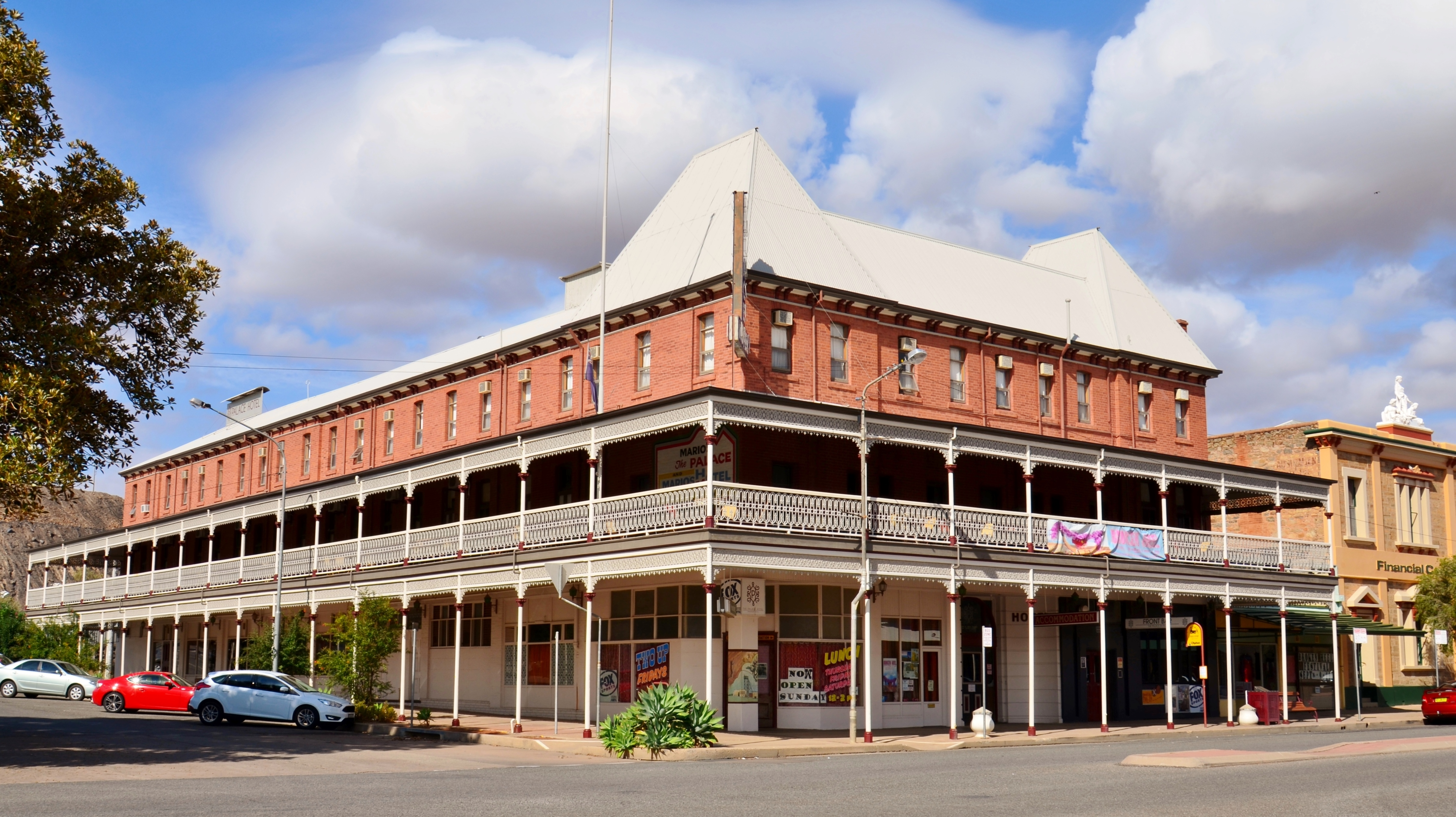
Palace Hotel, Broken Hill (1889)

There is a fair amount of regional variation in Victorian Filigree-styled verandahs, with many regions having their own distinctive styles and locally-cast ornamental ironwork. The distribution of these variations often paid less attention to administrative boundaries and more to the flows of trade networks: for instance, the filigree-style verandahs of the New South Wales outback are more influenced by the Adelaide style than the Sydney style. The Palace Hotel, Broken Hill (1889), was designed by Melbourne architect Alfred Dunn, and features patterns from the Sun foundry in Adelaide, as does the Post Office Hotel, Bourke (1888). In Queensland, the Australian Hotel, Townsville (1888), features a local pattern which is only found in that state.

There is very little regional variation in the terraces of provincial Victoria, with the Melbourne style dominating in that state. The exception to this is a local style of ironwork that can be found in Ballarat and Bendigo. Gold mining towns host some of the more magnificent examples of ornamental cast iron in regional Victoria, partly because they were prosperous, but also because they had foundries. In the 1880s – the heyday of the decorative cast iron – Bendigo had at least three foundries producing it. Contrary to the round cast iron columns of the Melbourne style, in Ballarat and Bendigo there is a local style of flat, openwork verandah supports, not unlike those regularly found in Sydney. One of the standard Ballarat designs has a distinctive strawberry pattern, with an example found at 450 Wendouree Parade, Ballarat. An openwork pilaster design produced by the Phoenix Foundry in Ballarat can still be found at Nyora, Eaglehawk (1884), and on Hawthorn Park, Mount Rowan (1881).

=== Examples of the Victorian Filigree style ===
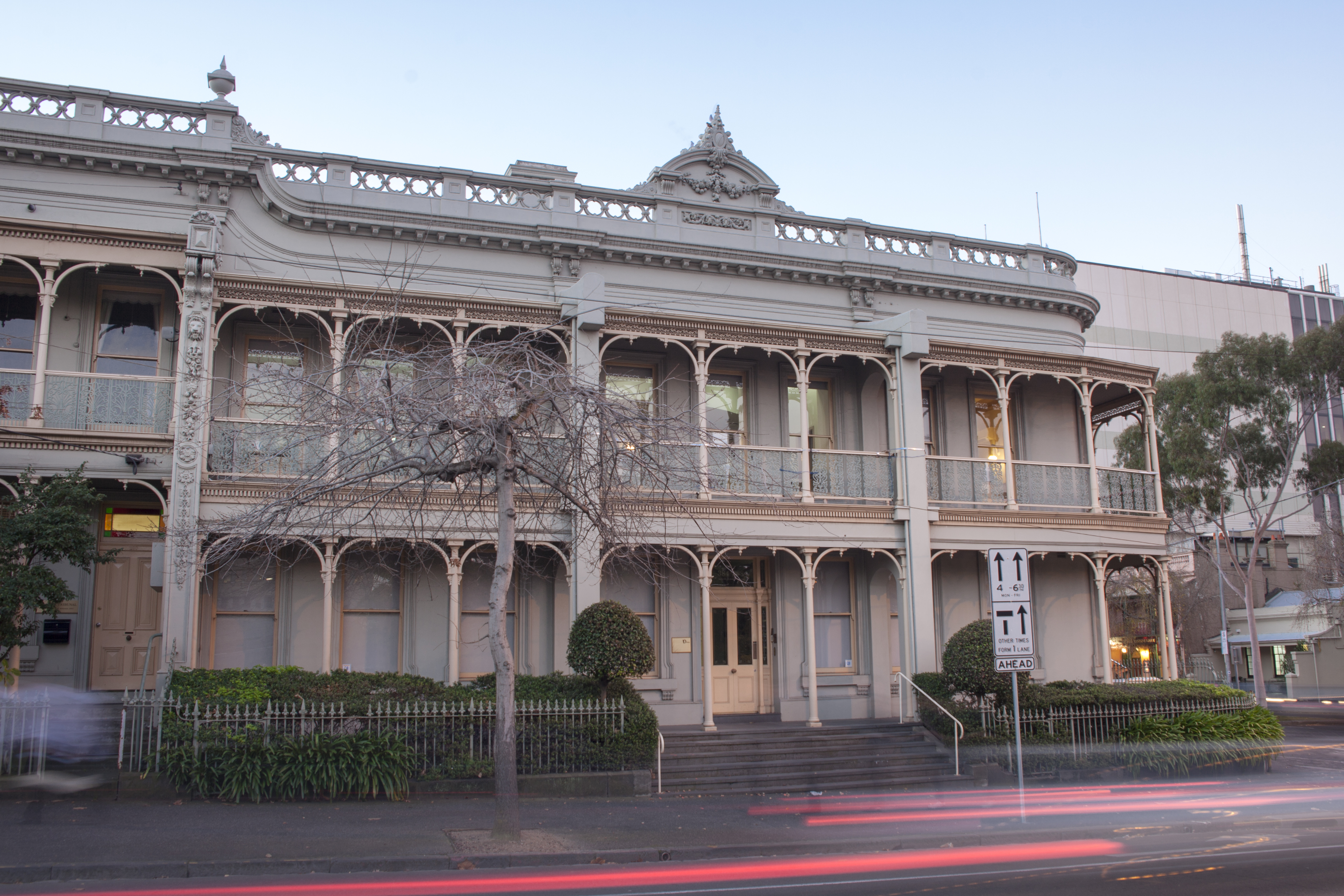
Burlington Terrace, East Melbourne (1867)

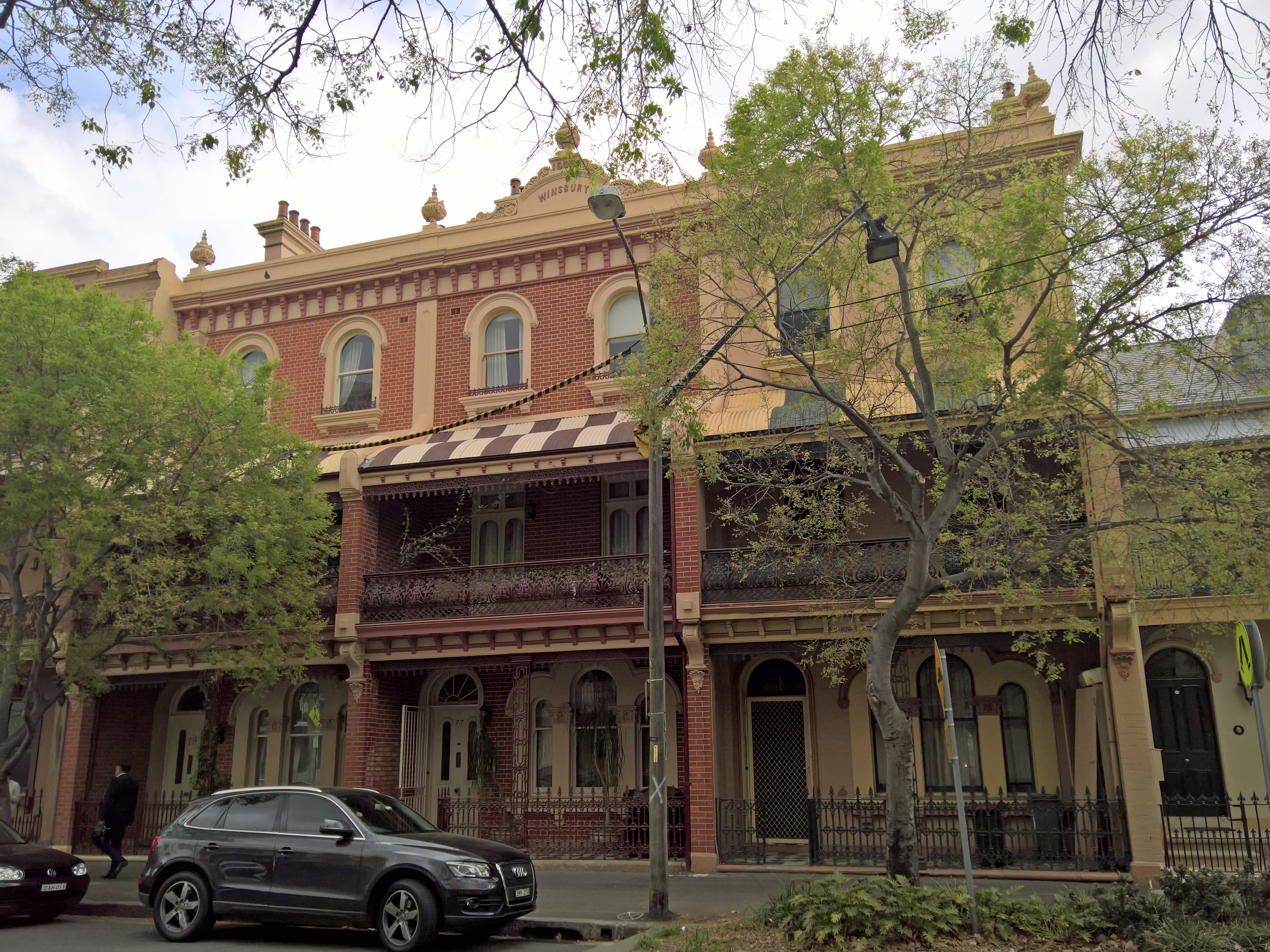
Winsbury Terrace, Millers Point (c. 1875)

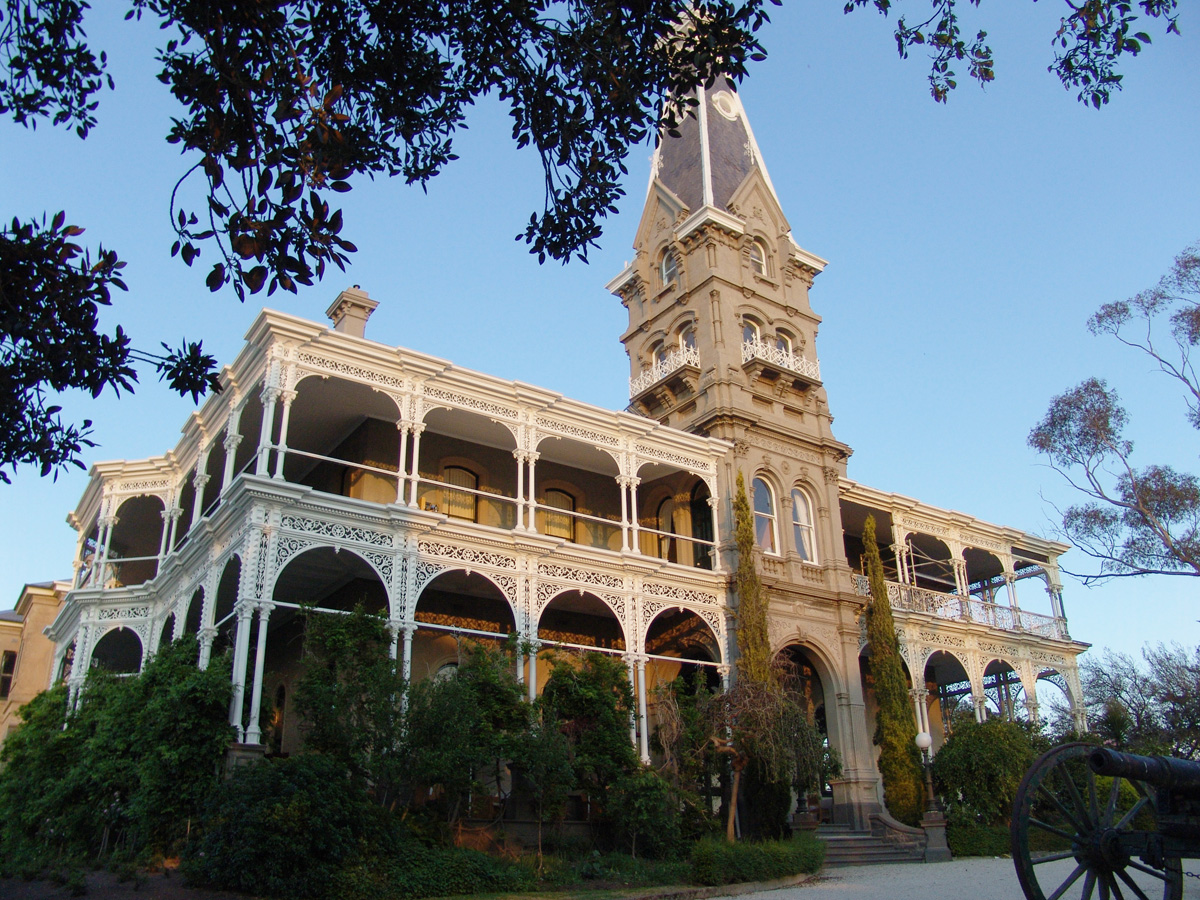
Rupertswood, Sunbury (1874-76); architect George Brown

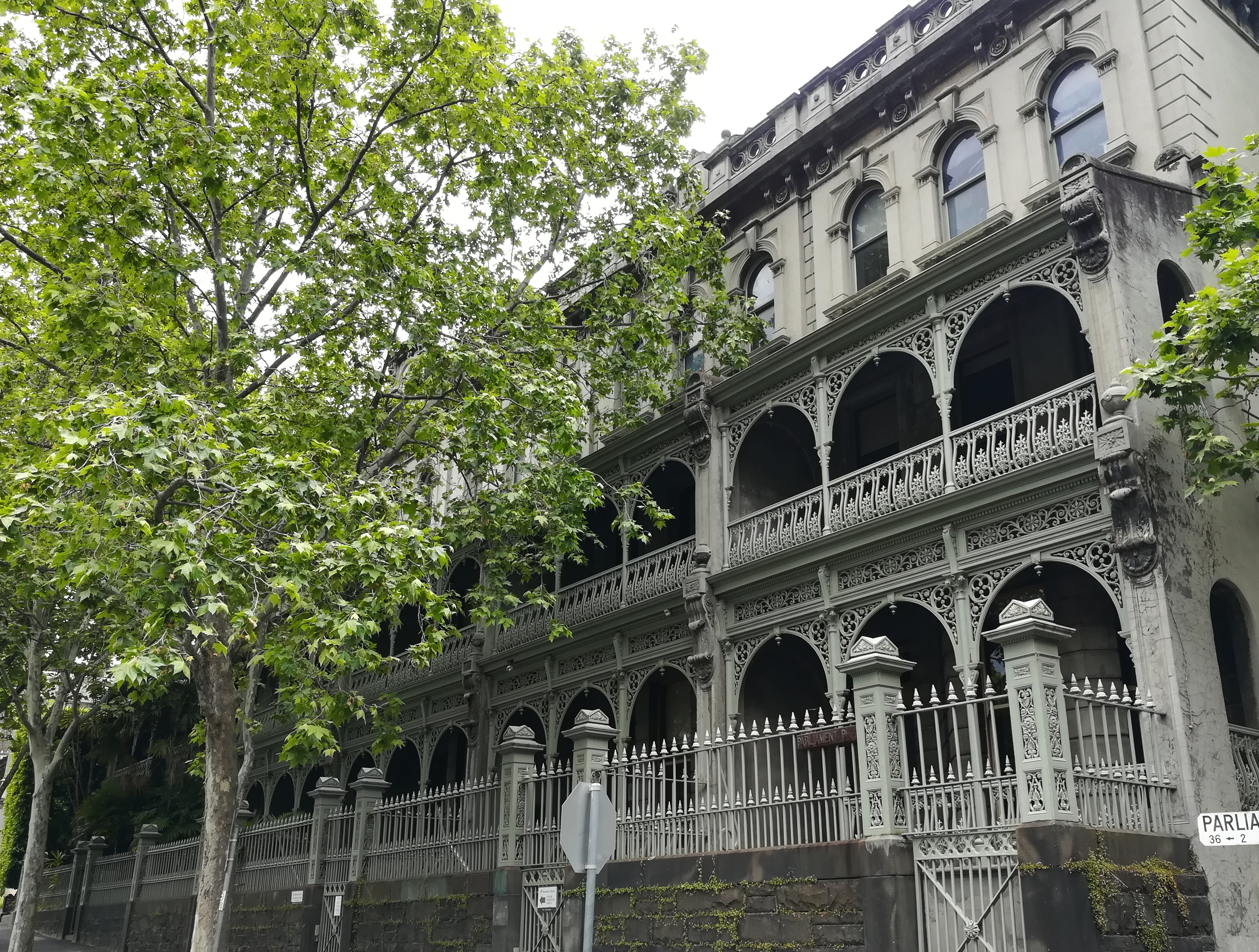
Tasma Terrace, East Melbourne (1879). Victorian Free Classical terrace with filigree verandahs.

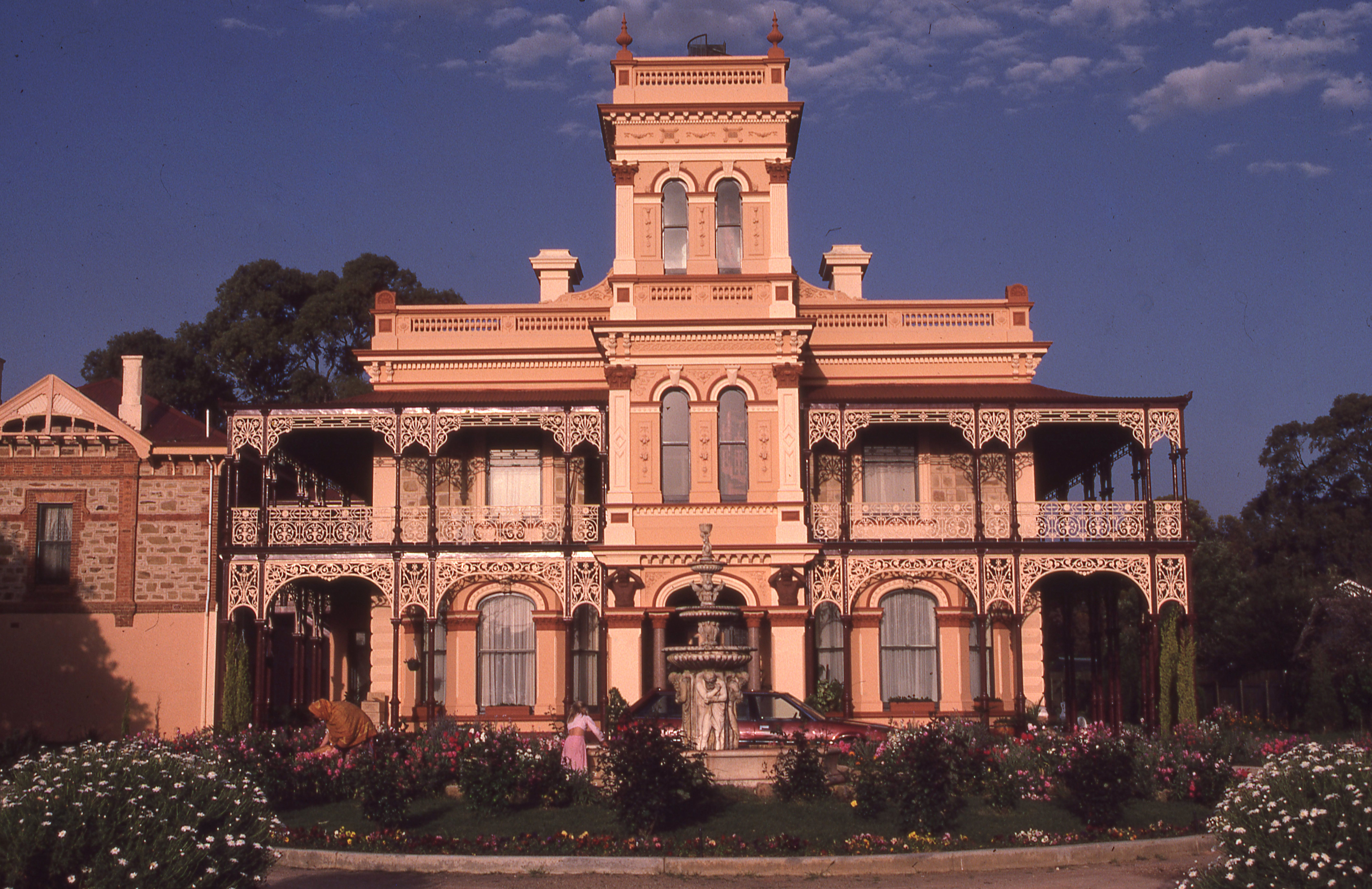
Eynesbury House, Kingswood (1881)

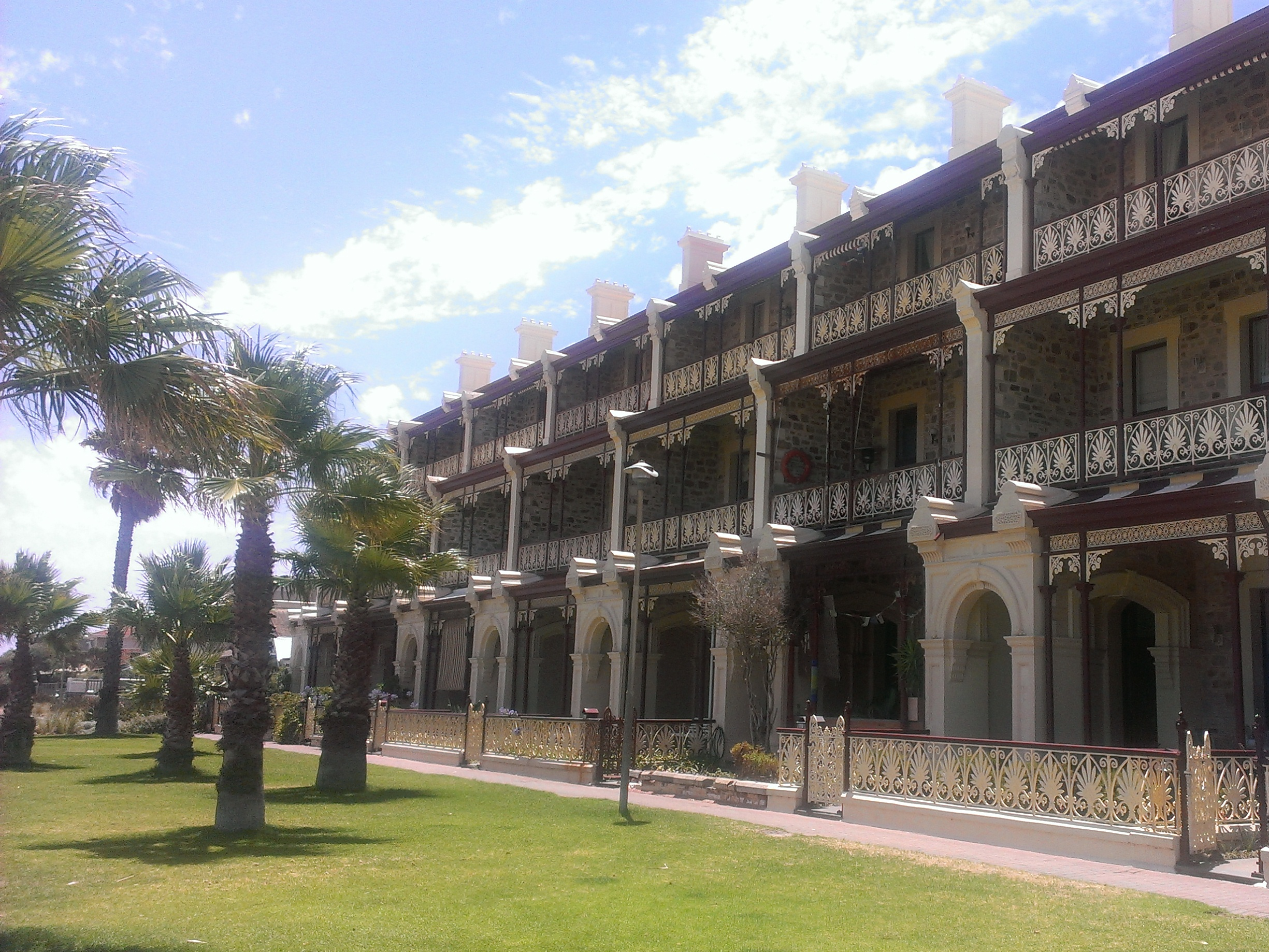
Marine Terrace, Grange Beach (1884). A key example of the Adelaide-style, with three storeys of setback filigree verandahs.

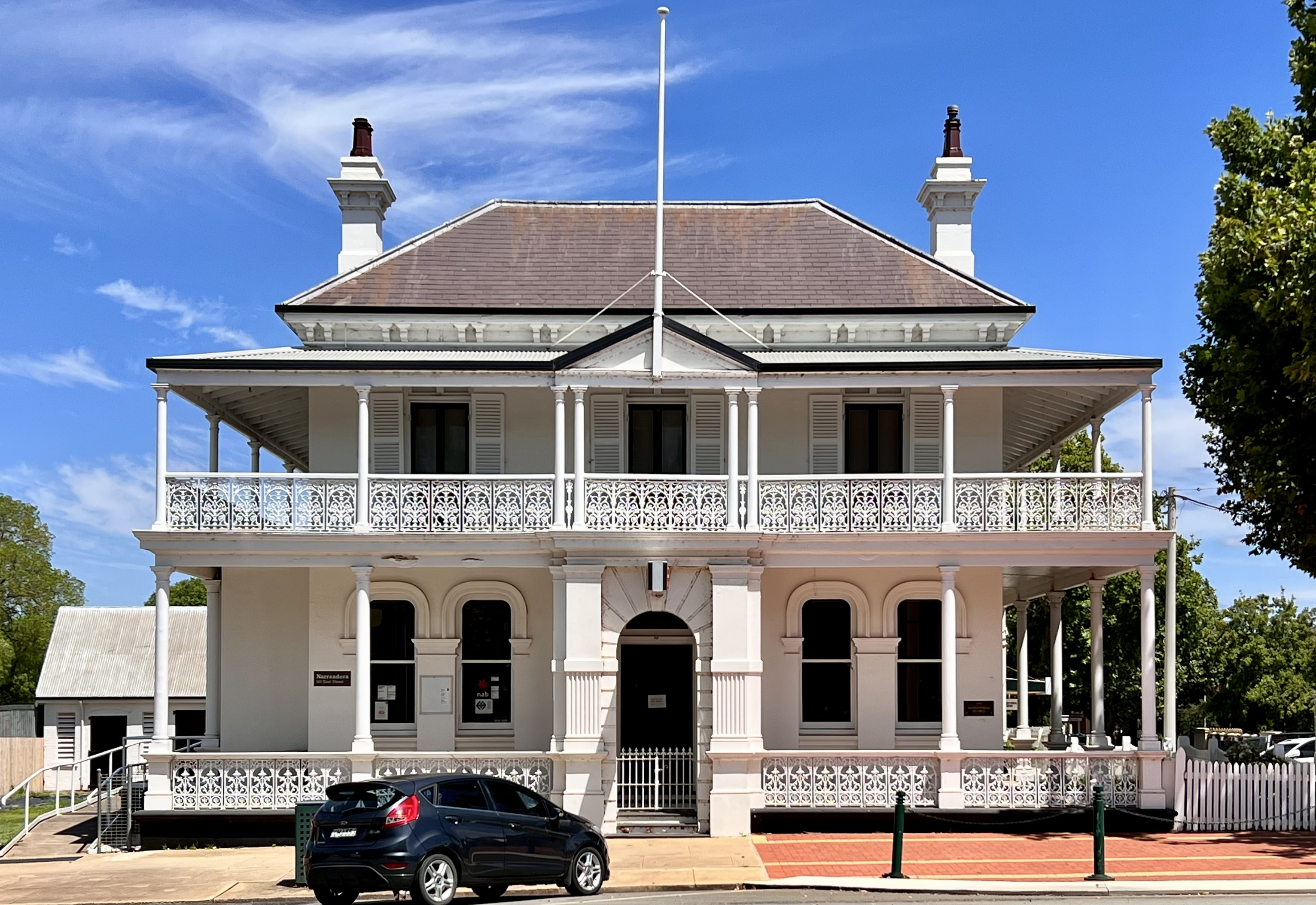
Commercial Banking Company of Sydney Bank Building, Narrandera (1884-1885)

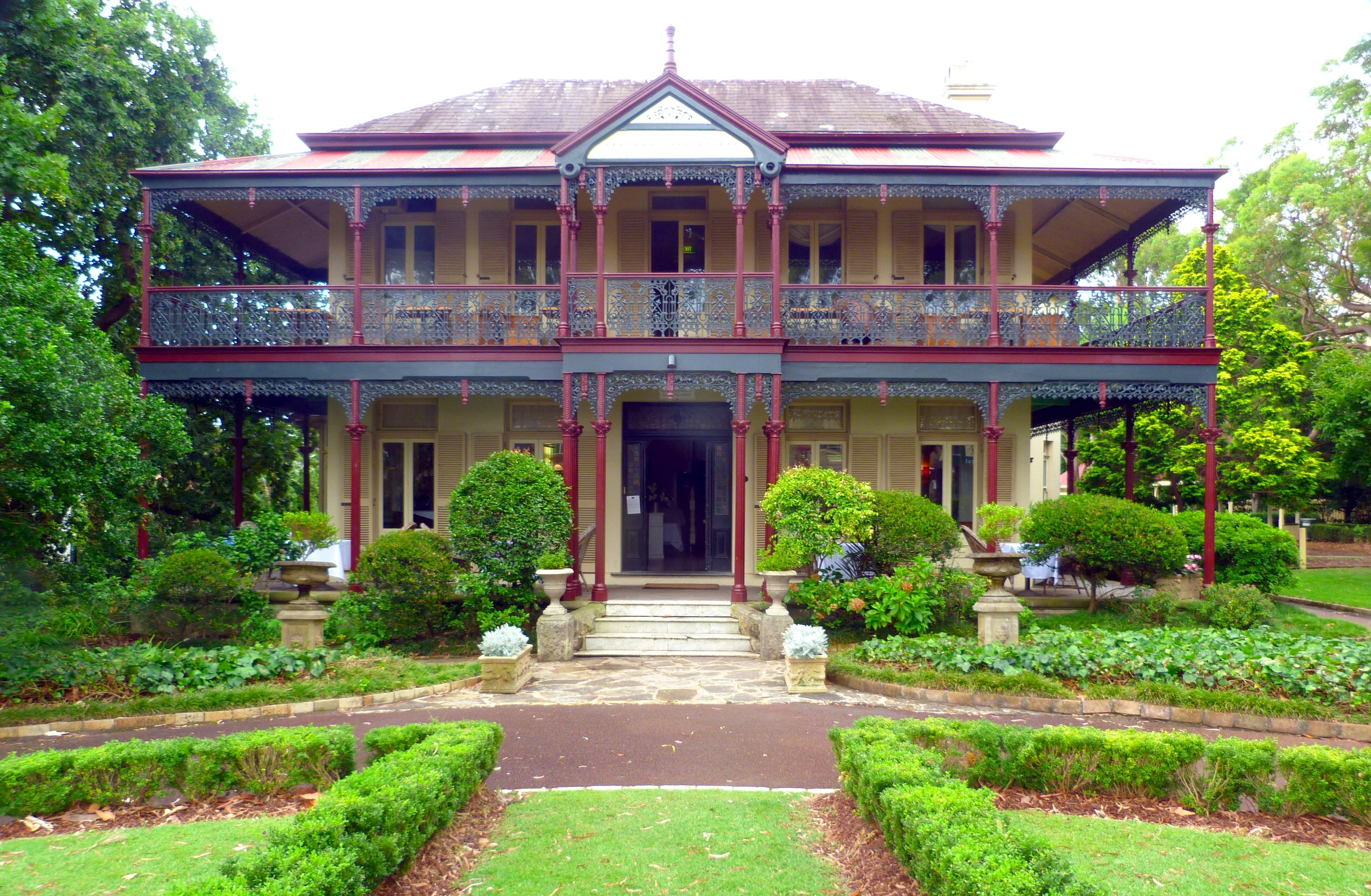
Boronia House, Mosman (1885)

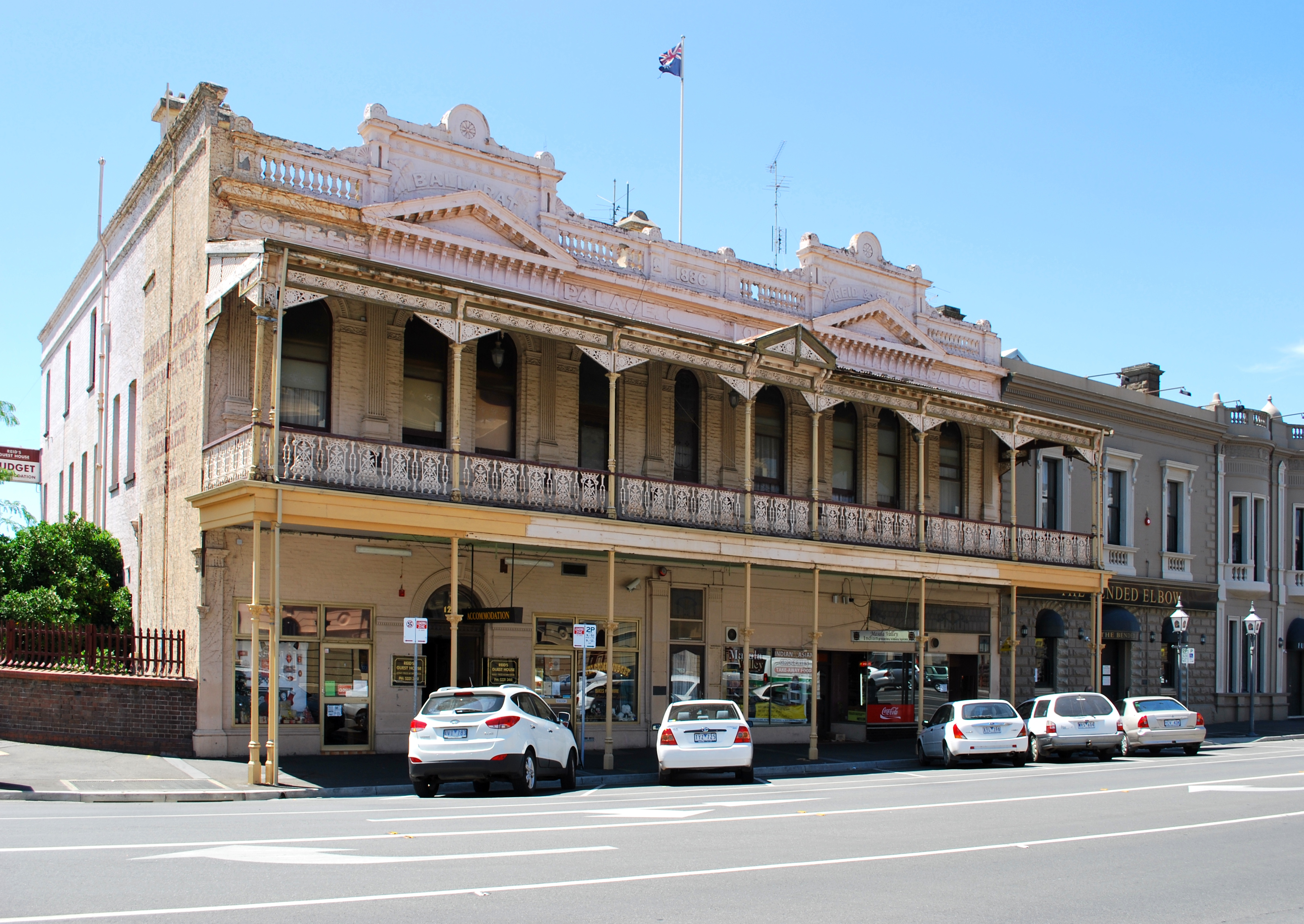
Reid's Coffee Palace, Ballarat (1886)

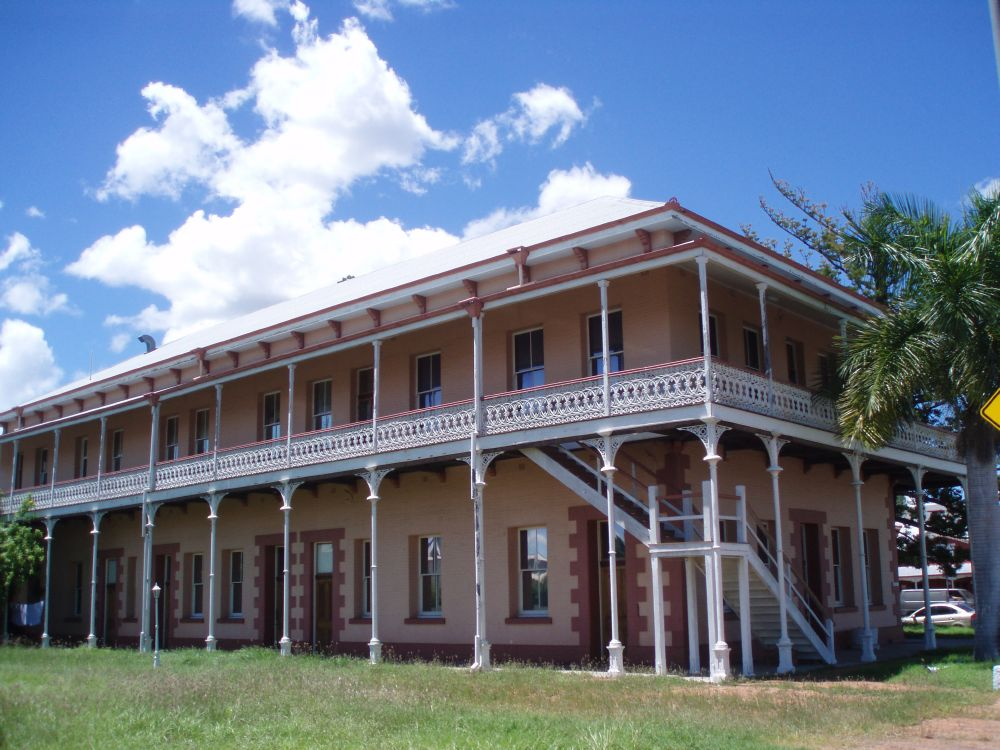
Railway Administration Building, Rockhampton (1886)

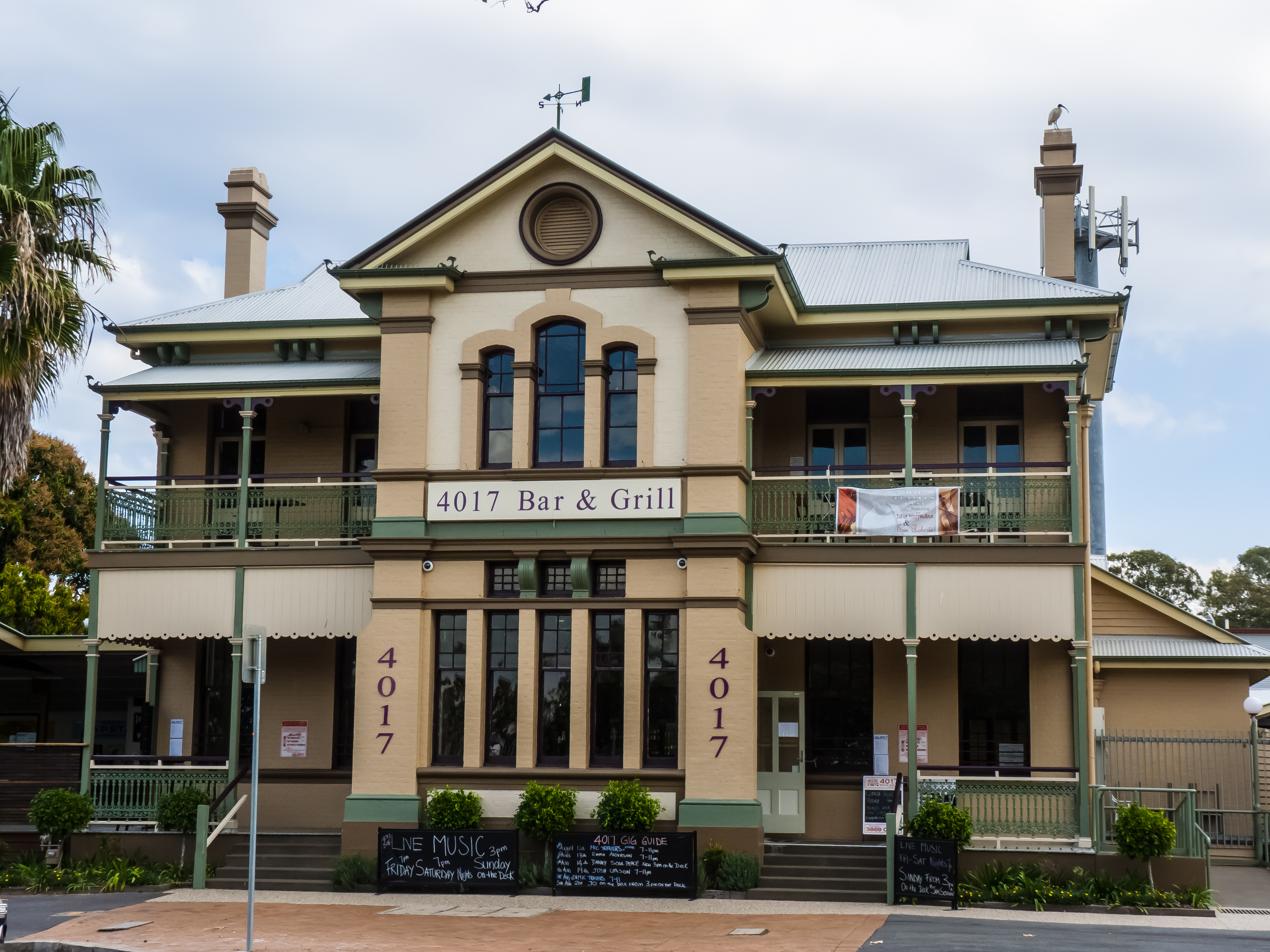
Post Office, Sandgate (1886-87)

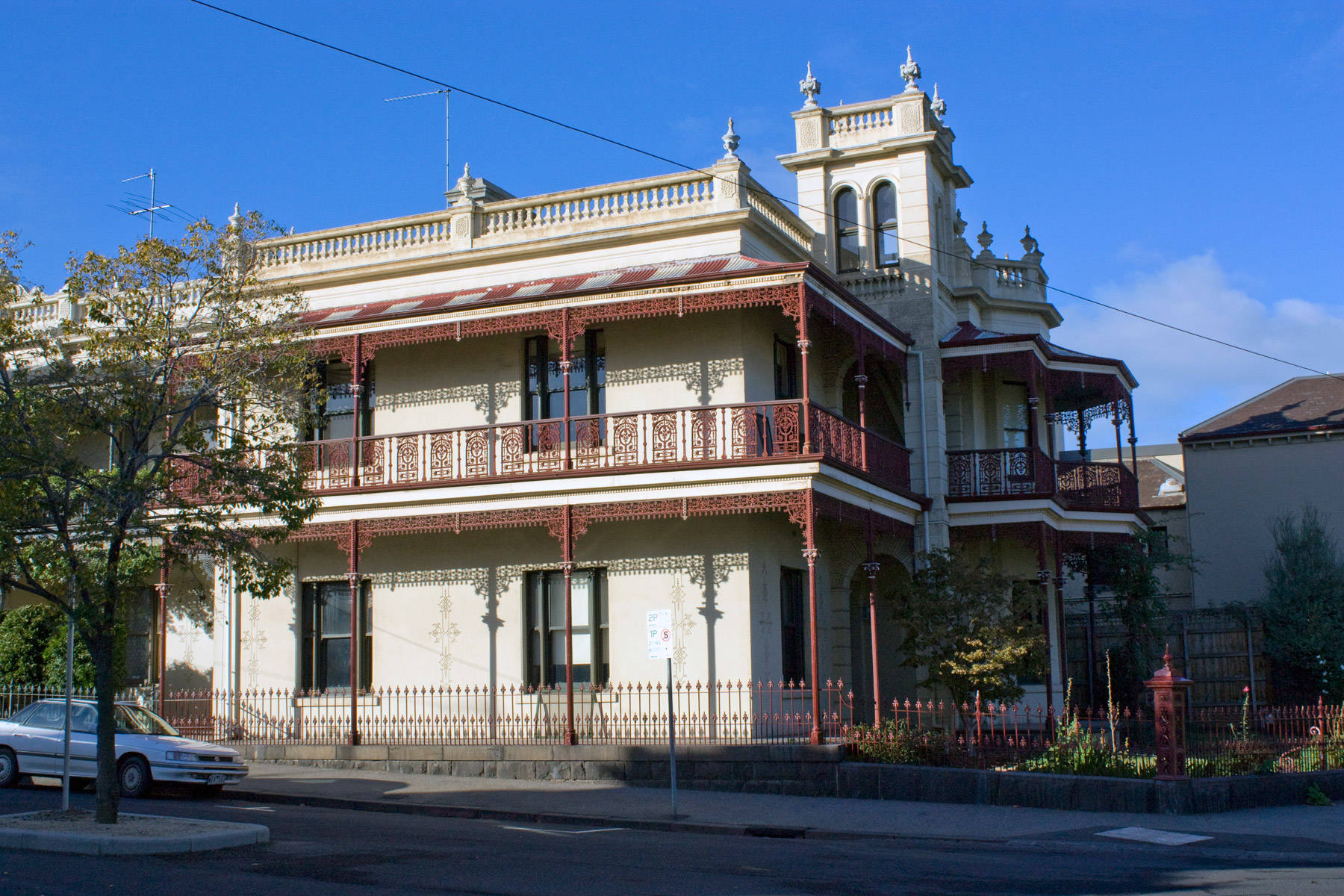
Wardlow, Parkville (1888). An Italianate mansion with canted verandah screens.

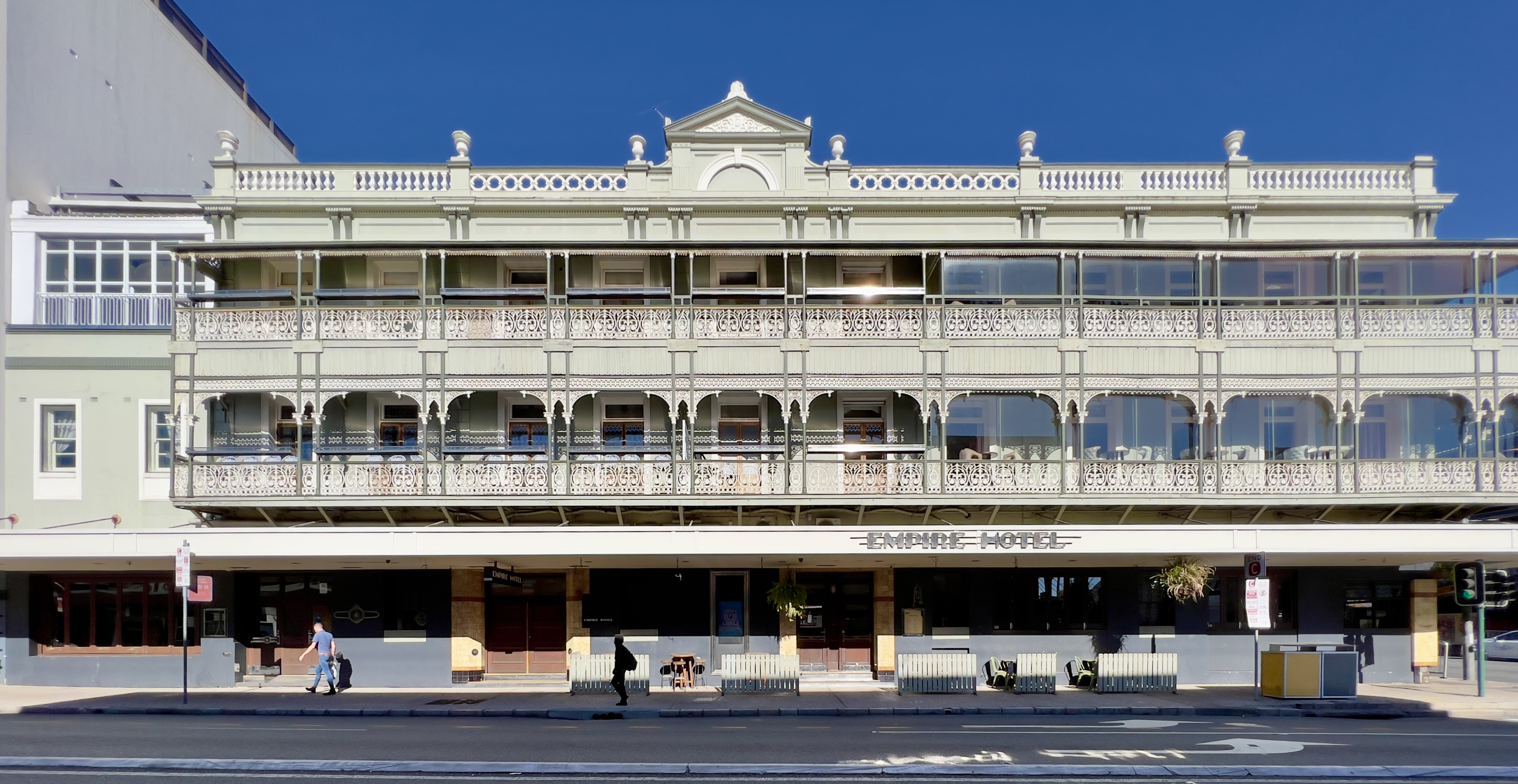
Empire Hotel, Fortitude Valley (1888); architect Richard Gailey; builders Smith & Ball

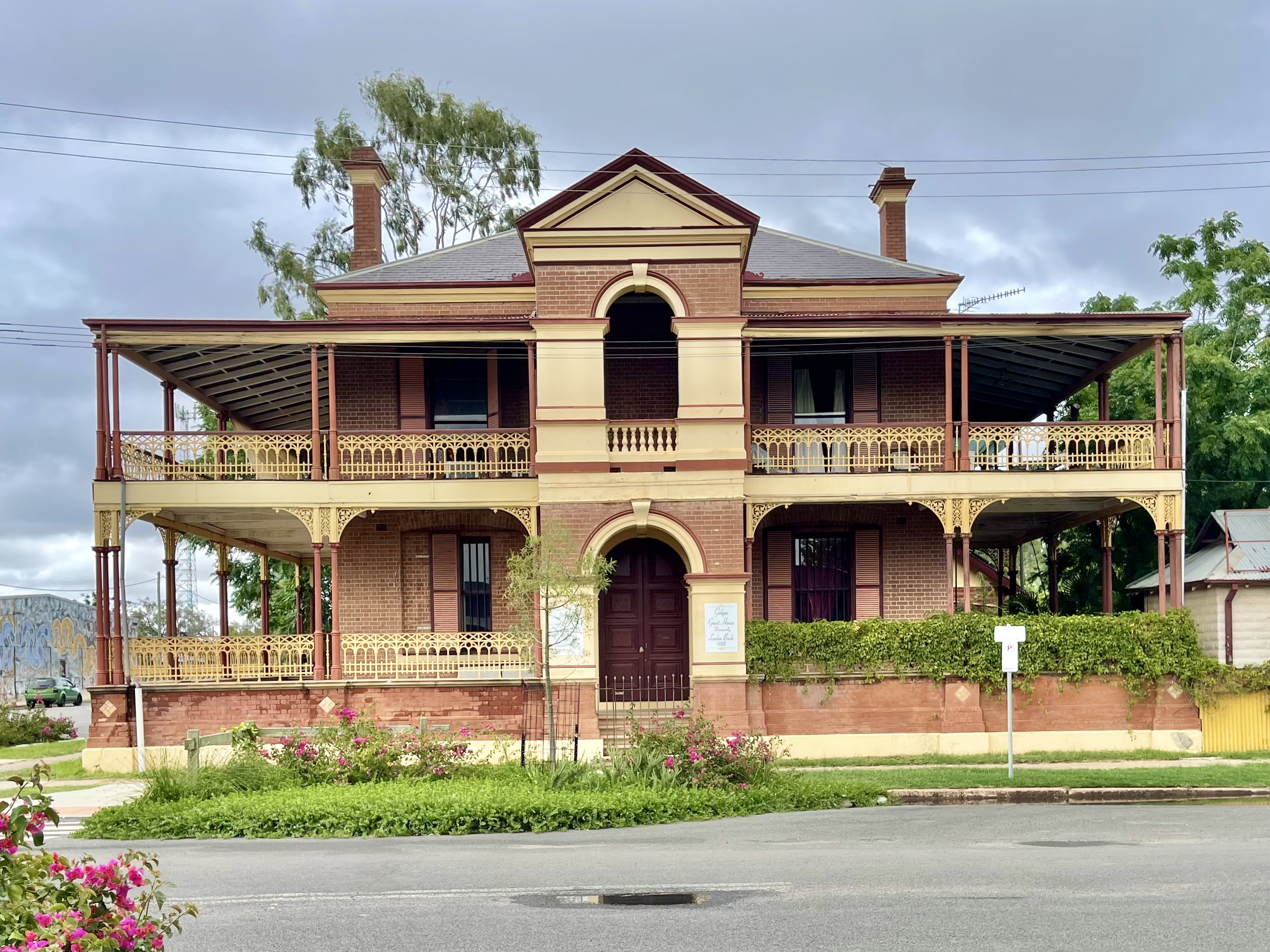
London Chartered Bank of Australia Building, Bourke (1888)

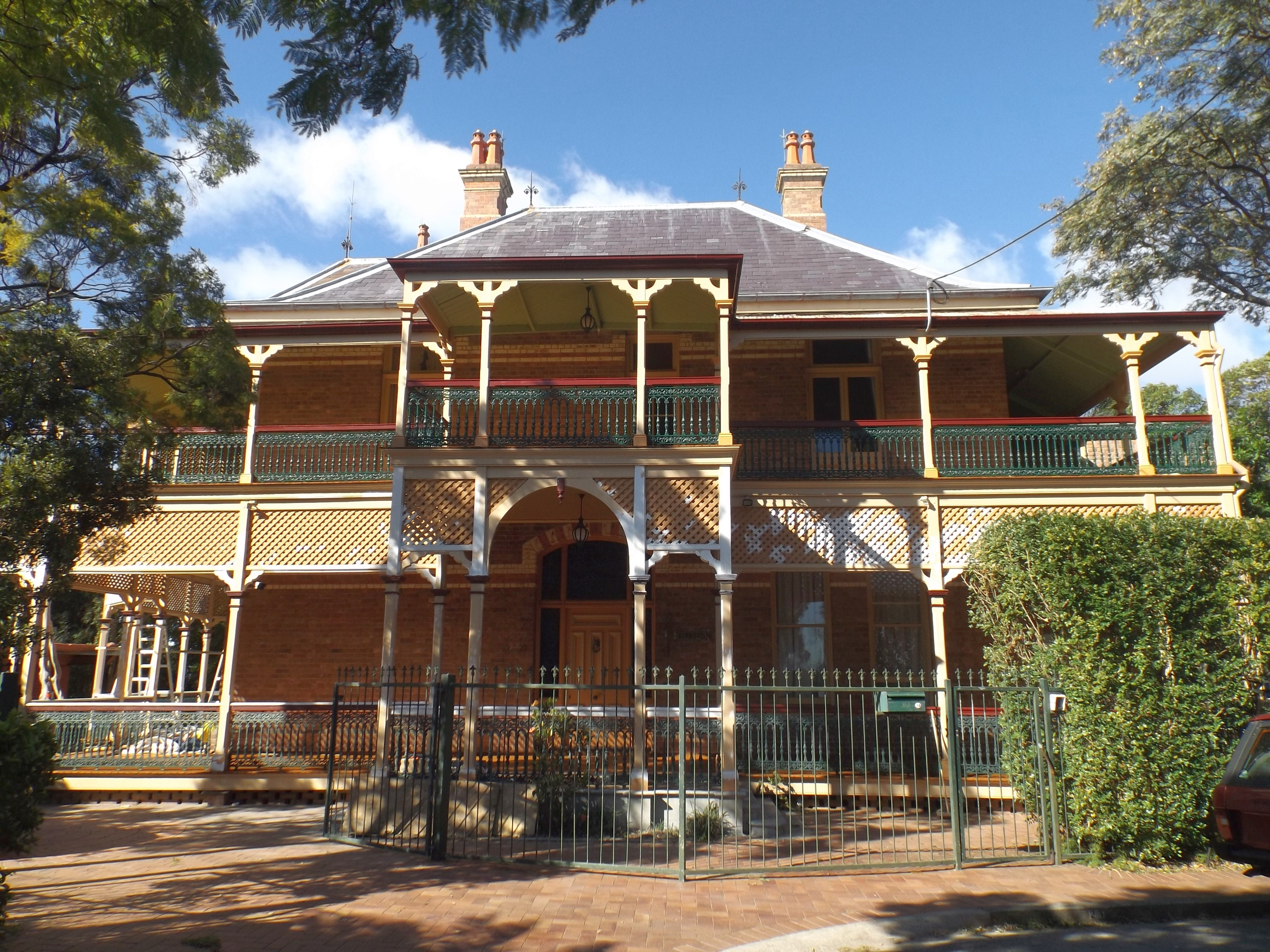
Kirkston, Windsor (1889)

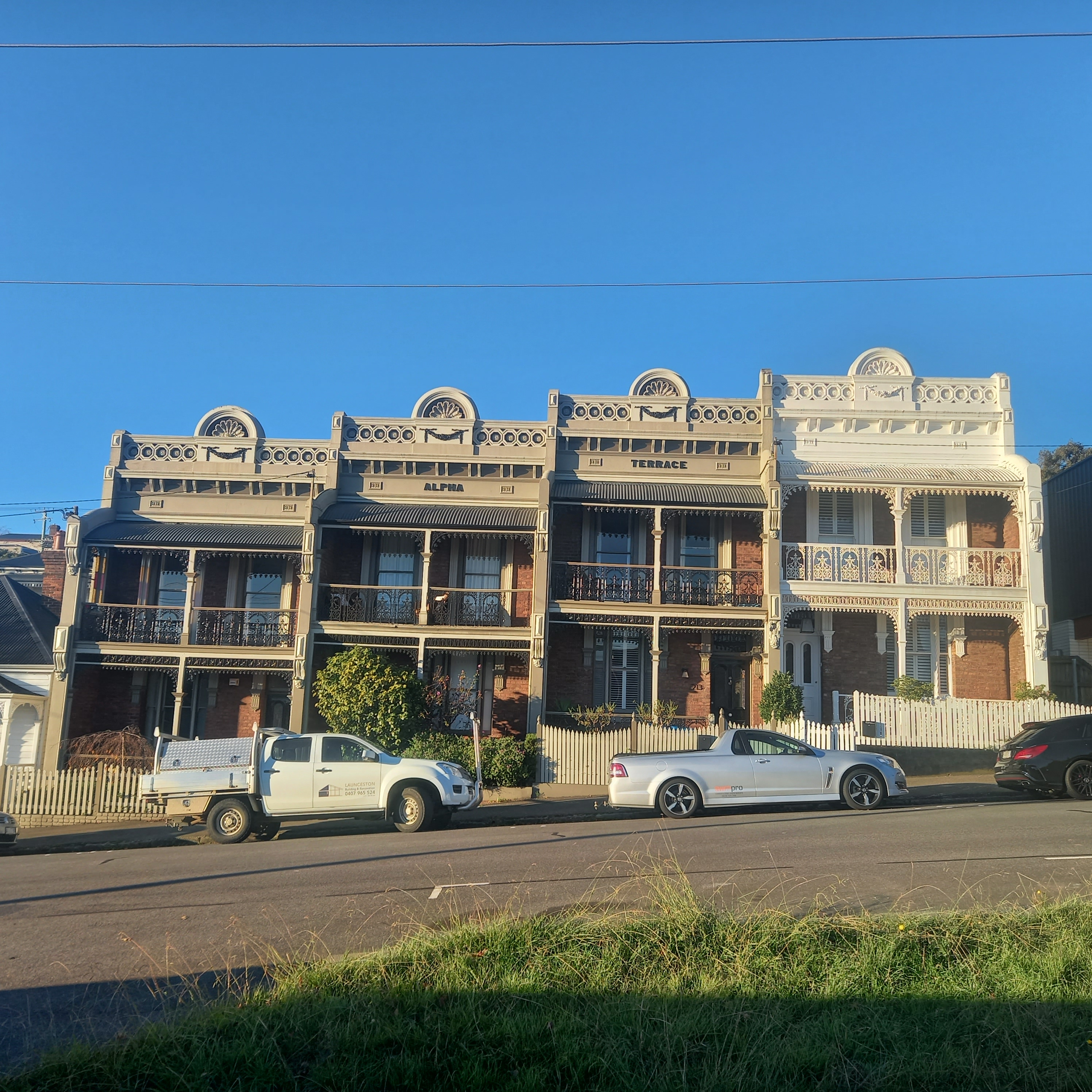
Alpha Terrace, Launceston (late-1880s)

== Federation Filigree ==
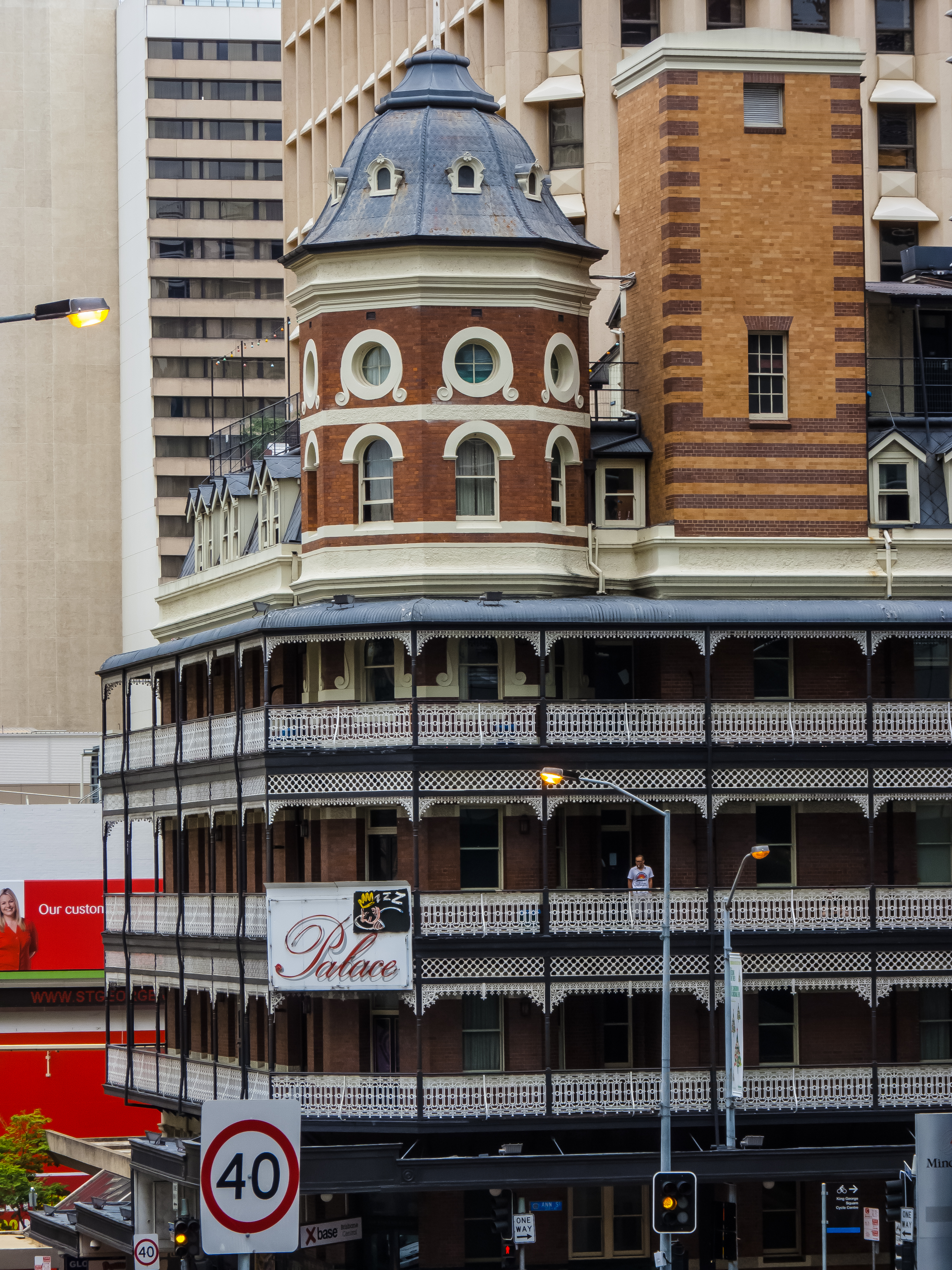
People's Palace, Brisbane; a red-brick temperance hotel built in stages between 1910 and 1913

The Federation era saw a change in the materials used to construct verandah screens. For the most part, the style remained essentially the same; large filigree verandahs standing proud of the building and dominating the facade. What changed was the materials.

Red-brick buildings were a hallmark of the Federation Filigree style. In the Victorian era, the facades of buildings varied; they could be unrendered face-brick or they could be rendered and painted in a myriad of colours; the bricks could be pale blonde, Hawthorn Blacks, or any manner of polychrome arrangement. In contrast, one of the defining characteristics of Federation architecture is its affection for an unrendered, red brick facade. This was driven by a historicist interest in the architecture of the Queen Anne period, a kind of reactionary homage to an imagined England of the past. In red brick, the Federation era had found its staple ingredient, spreading it on every external-facing wall, from train stations to substations, from mansions to terrace houses.

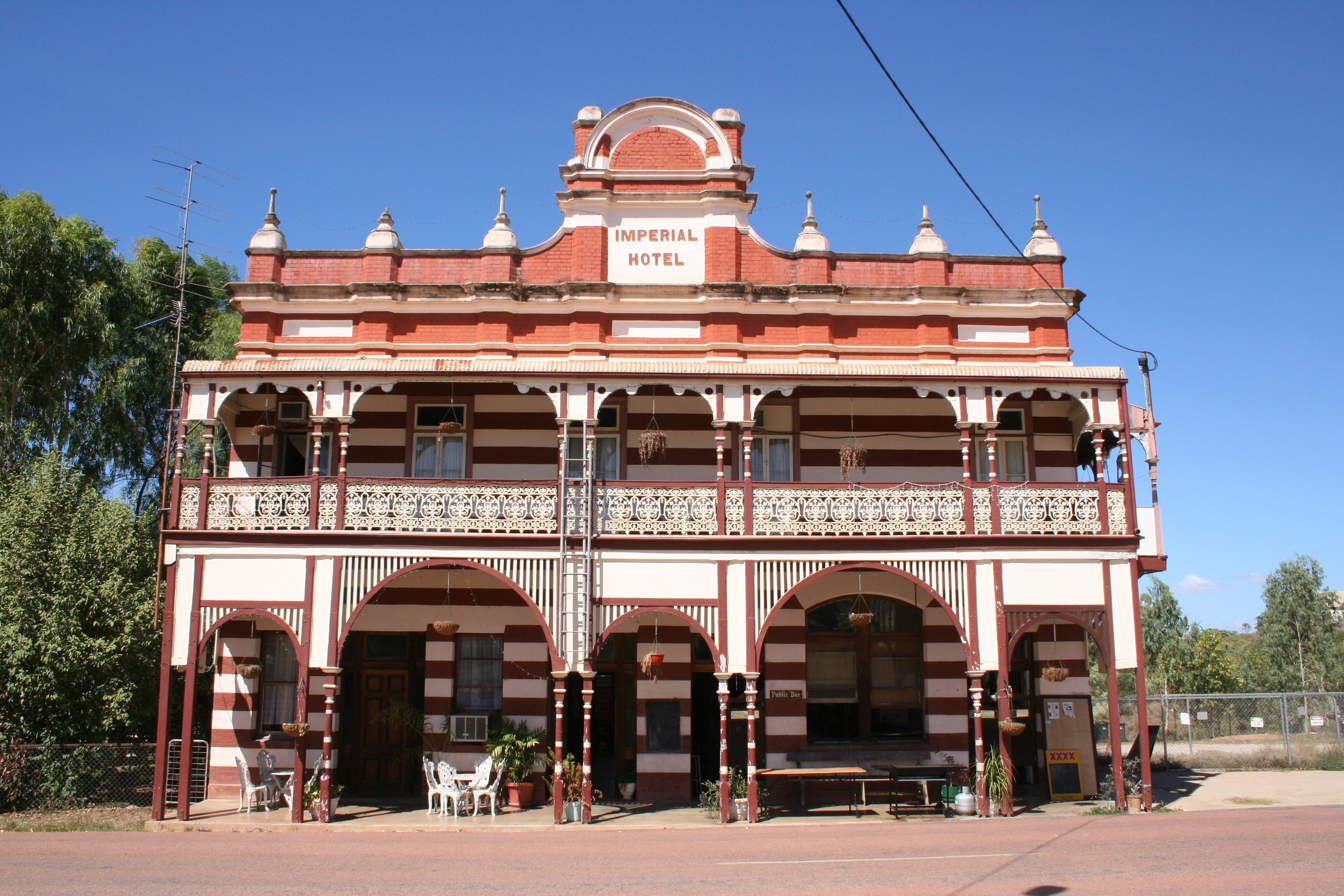
Imperial Hotel, Ravenswood (1901). The blood-and-bandages is a key feature, combining with the verandah to create a state of dazzlement.

A quest for novelty and eclecticism often marked architecture in this period, and influences were drawn from Romanesque, Moorish and Art Nouveau traditions to create eccentric and idiosyncratic facades. Contrast was often created through using clashing materials such as red-brick broken up by bands of white/cream stone or stucco. This is sometimes called a blood-and-bandages or bacon-rind effect. On the Imperial Hotel, Ravenswood (1901), the verandah is composed of an eclectic mix of timber and cast iron. Each section of the verandah plays with light and colour in different ways. Underneath the verandah, bands of red and white are striped horizontally across the facade. This blood-and-bandages design is a key part of the Filigree Style, as it combines with the verandah to dazzle onlookers with contrasting shapes and colours. Other notable examples of Federation Filigree-styled buildings employing the blood-and-bandages effect for dazzlement purposes include the Kurri Kurri Hotel, Kurri Kurri (opened in 1904, extended 1909–1915), and the Broadway Hotel, Junee (1914).

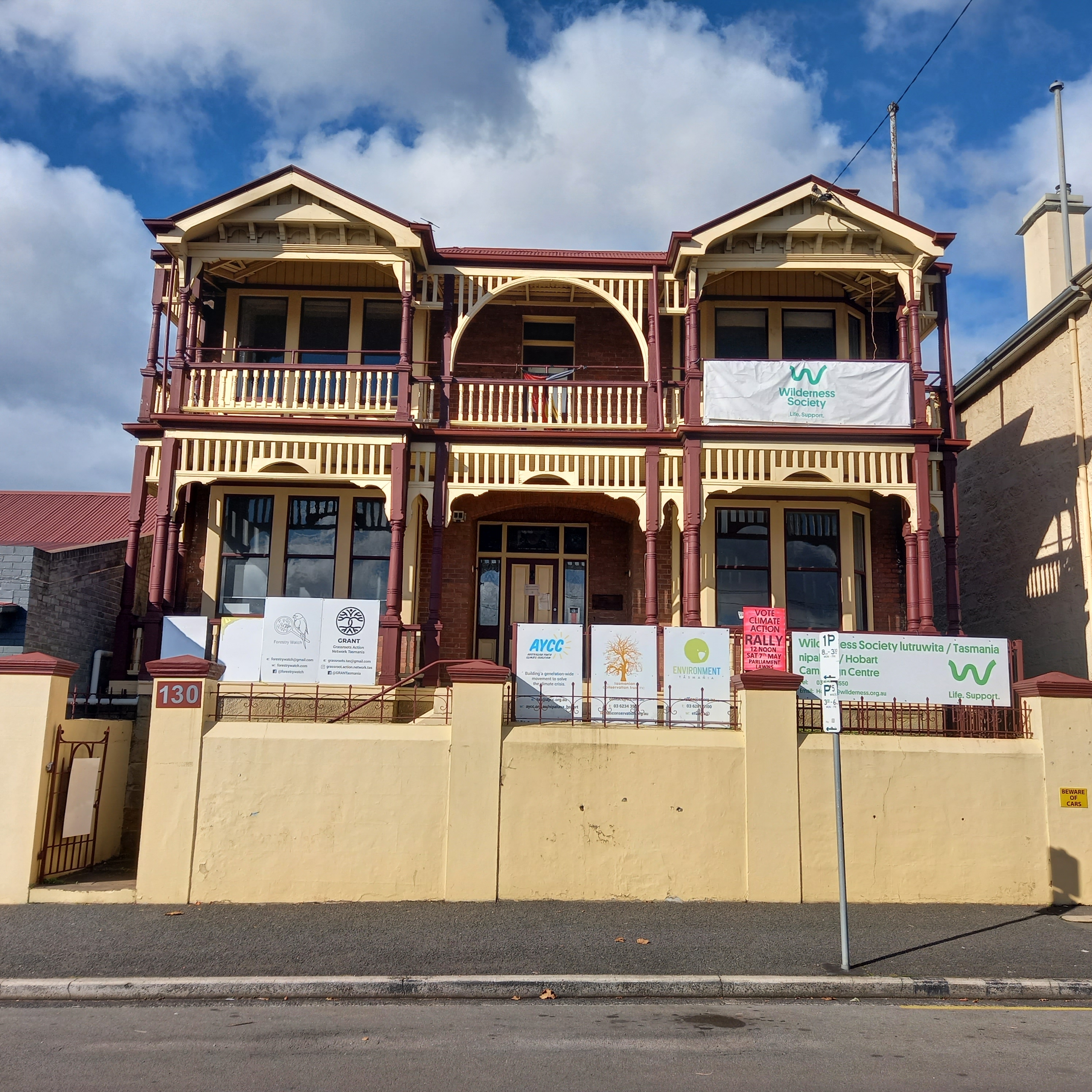
The timber verandah is the defining feature of this house on Davey Street, Hobart.

The most marked and relevant change in the Filigree Style was to the filigree itself, with timber becoming the primary material with which verandahs and balconies were constructed. A reactionary dismay at the standardised, industrial nature of the Victorian era had led to a demand for novel, naturalised materials such as timber and wrought iron. Timber had a natural feeling to it, as it was an organic material alluding to thousands of years of carpentry and craftsmanship, but in truth it was manufactured just as much as cast ironwork was. Advancements in technology lead to steam-powered and, later, electricity-powered machines such as bandsaws, jigsaws and lathes. Suddenly, timber could be carved, fretted and turned, quickly and cheaply, resulting in vast quantities of timber verandah ornamentation becoming available to the mass market. Areas that experienced large amounts of upper-middle class development in the Federation era contain some of the best surviving domestic examples of the timbered-verandah style. Notable areas include Sydney's North Shore, Perth and Launceston, which contain many examples including Hargate (c. 1900-03); Kilmarnock (1905); Victoria League House (c. 1905); and Werona (1908).

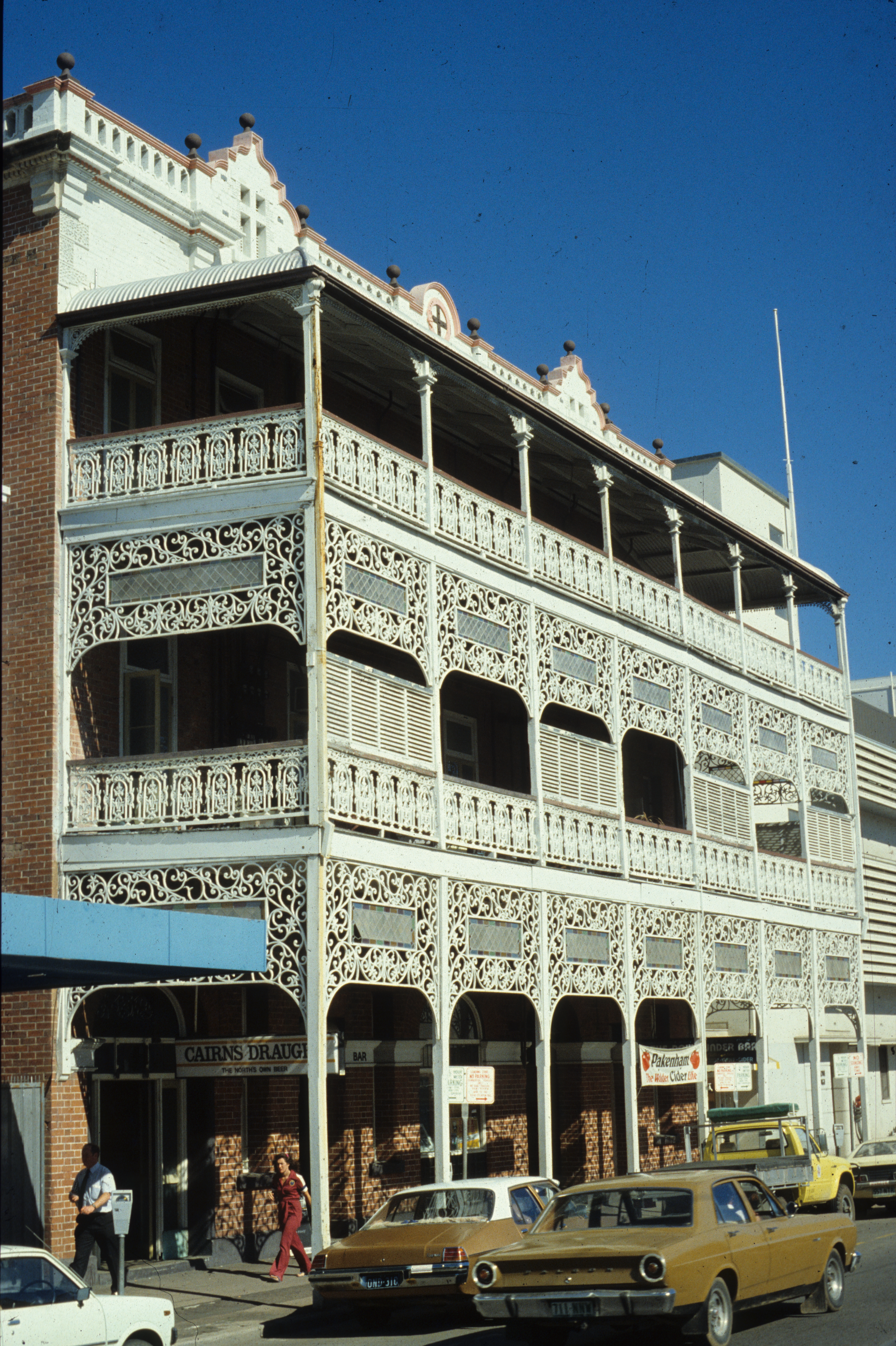
Buchanan's Hotel, Townsville. Built 1902, destroyed 1982. Three-tiered filigree in cast iron, wrought iron, timber and glass.

Wrought iron, worked by hand and containing all the individual quirks of a crafted commodity, was perhaps the truer expression of this desire for natural forms. Eastbourne House and terraces, East Melbourne (1906), likely designed by Robert Haddon in a florid, personal interpretation of Federation Art Nouveau-Filigree style, uses wrought iron to smash apart an established understanding of lacework balcony norms, drawing the balustrade out and down in a tendril to link up with the frieze beneath it. One of the most famous usages of wrought iron on a Federation verandah was Buchanan's Hotel, Townsville (1902). Its triple-storey verandah featuring cast iron balustrading, timber columns, ornate ventilation panels, deep wrought iron friezes and coloured glass insert panels were considered by many to be the pinnacle of the Filigree style. The wrought iron frieze panels were manufactured locally by Green's Foundry. In late 1982, a tragic fire tore through the rear section of the hotel leaving it severely damaged, but the brick facade and the verandah sustained only "limited damage". However, the council panicked and started demolishing the rear of the building and, when confronted by members of the National Trust, destroyed the frontage under the cover of nighttime. Glass was a fairly rare verandah component, but another notable Federation Filigree building to employ it was Soden's Hotel, Albury, which incorporates curvaceous Art Nouveau style stained glass and wrought iron. Verandahs were constructed quite late, with the hotel's licensee James Soden first constructing the grand entryway porch in 1920, then extending it into a whole wraparound verandah in 1925.

Federation Filigree style verandahs were often combined with the Queen Anne style, blending turned-timbered verandahs with Tudoresque gables and a cottage-like feel. On Beaufort Street in West Perth is a row of Federation Queen Anne-Filigree grand terraces built in c. 1897. The grandeur of the turreted row contrasts with the quaint Queen Anne detailing.

=== Examples of the Federation Filigree style ===
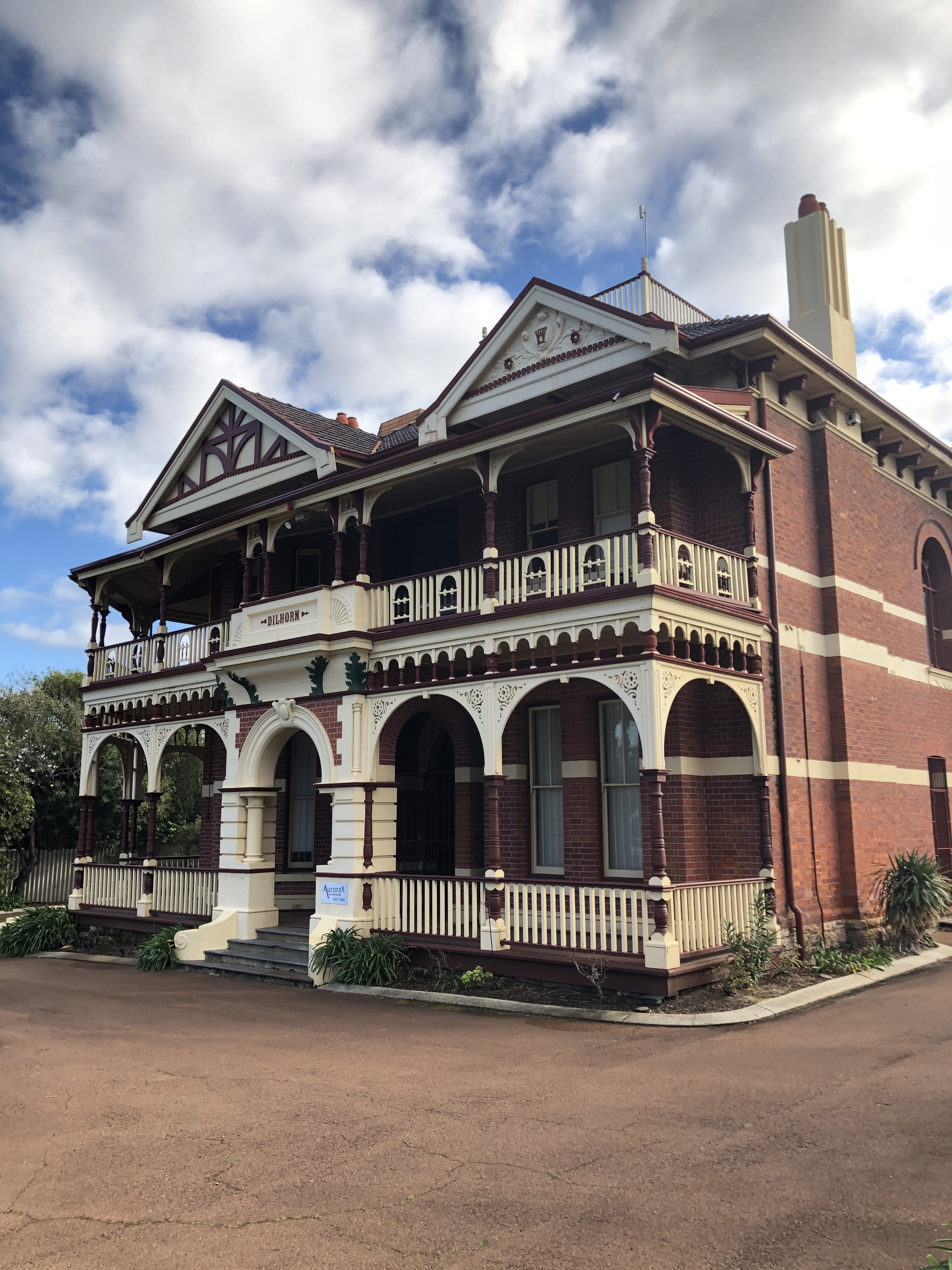
Dilhorn House, Perth (1897), architect Joseph John Talbot Hobbs

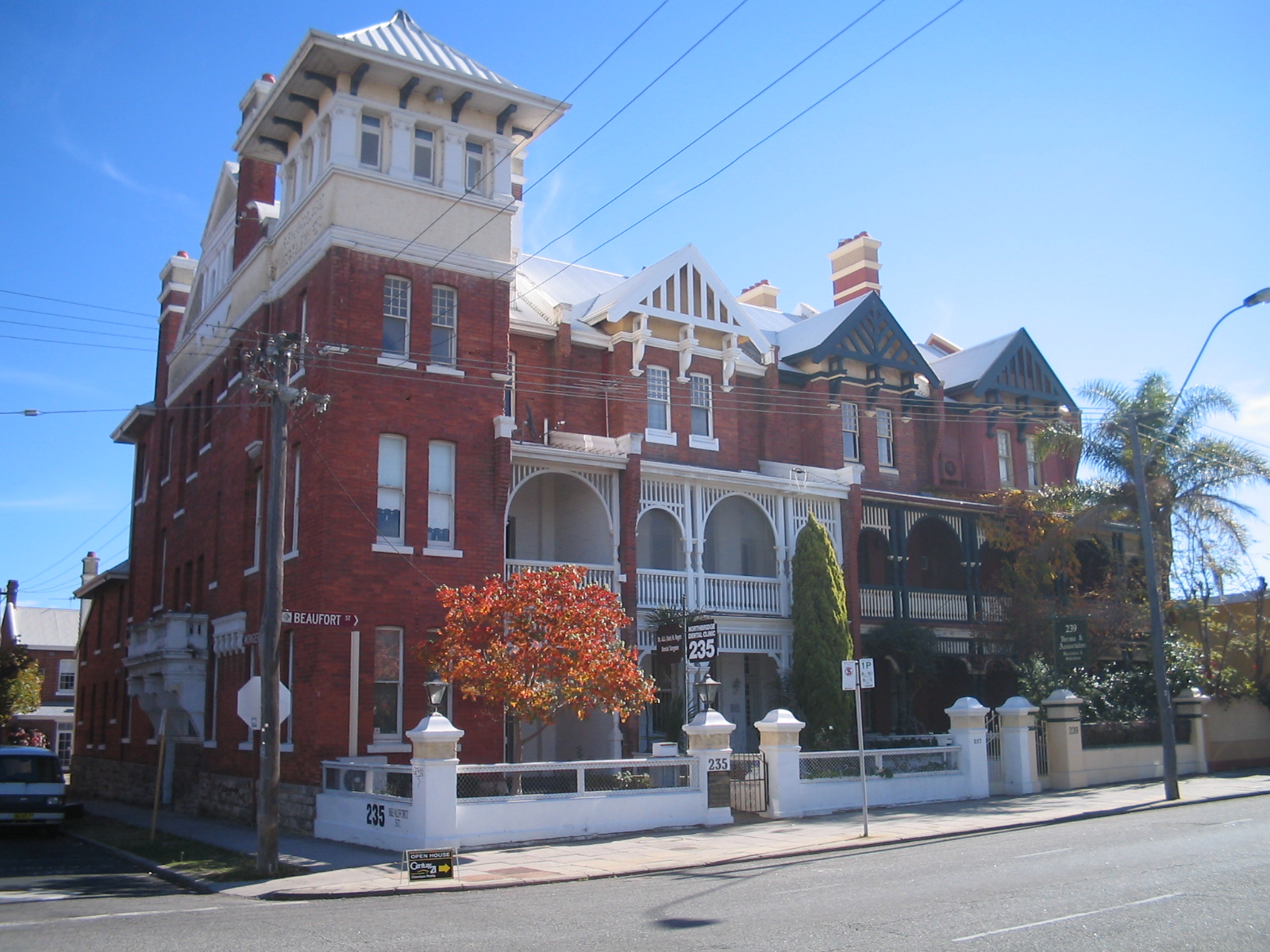
A row of Federation Queen Anne-Filigree grand terraces, Perth (c. 1897)

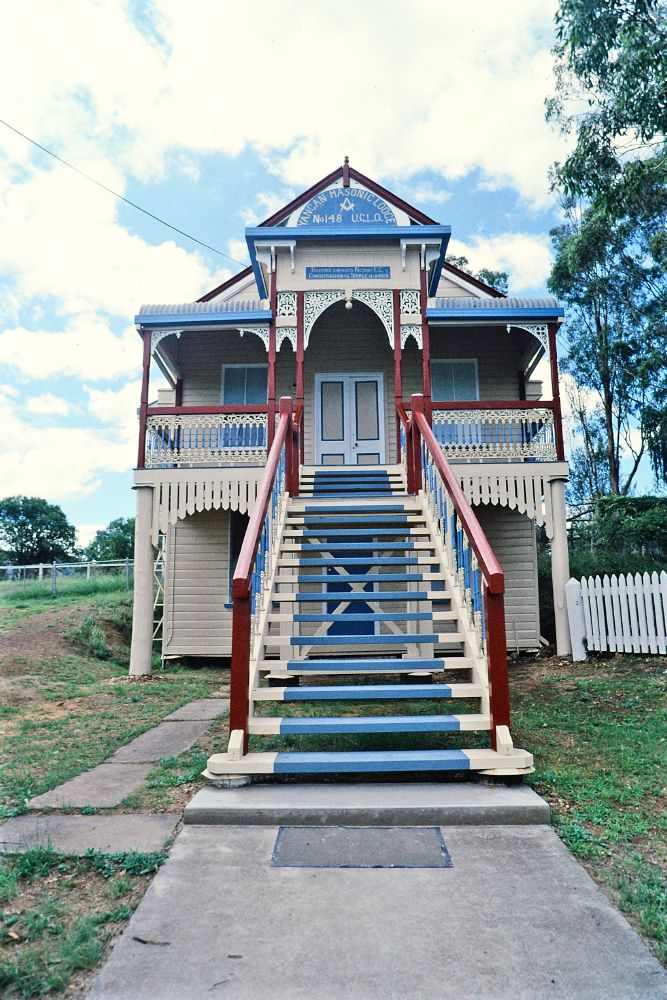
Yangan Masonic Hall (c. 1898)

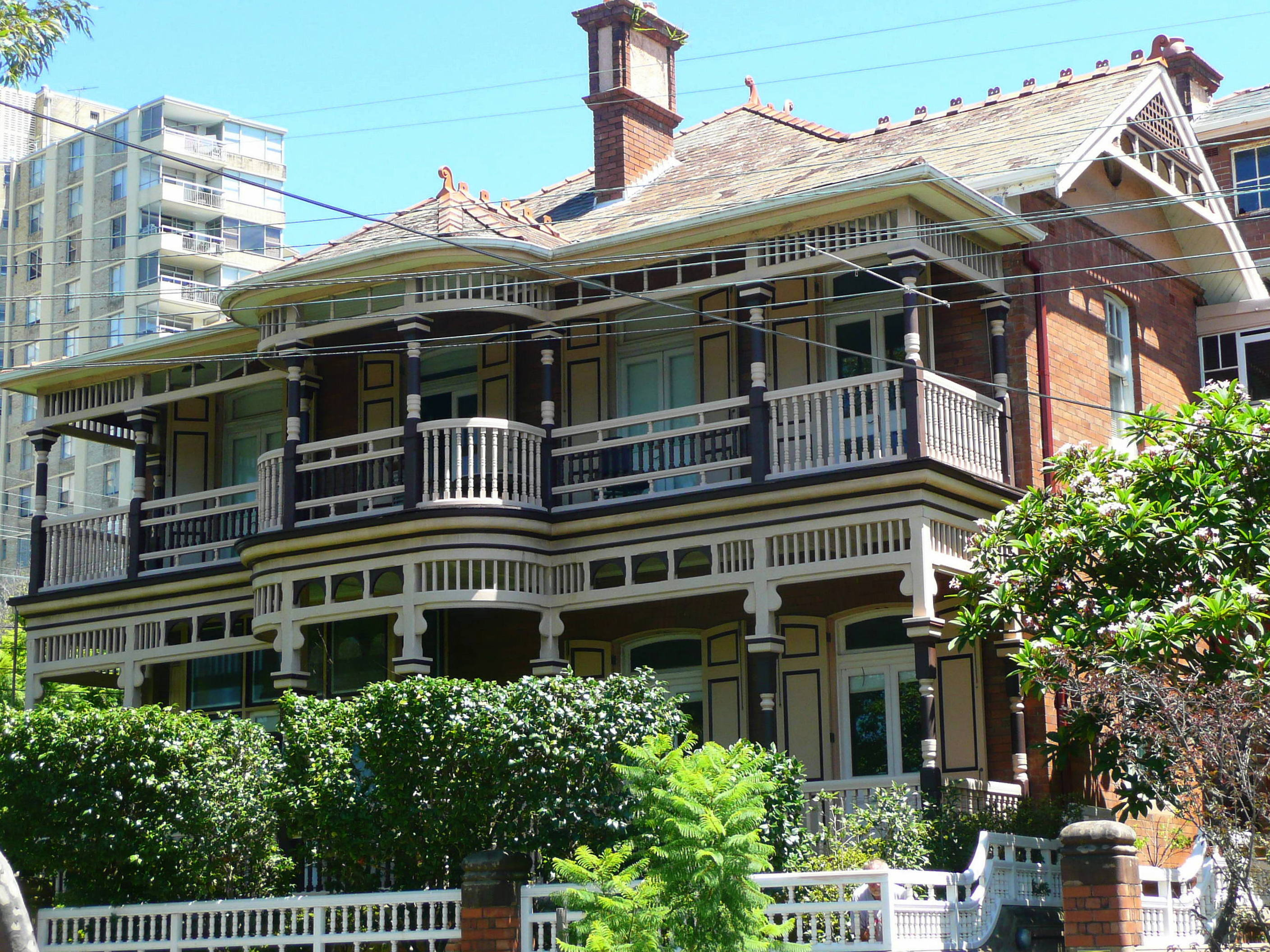
Elvo, Woollahra (c. 1900). A Queen Anne style house with strong Federation Filigree elements.

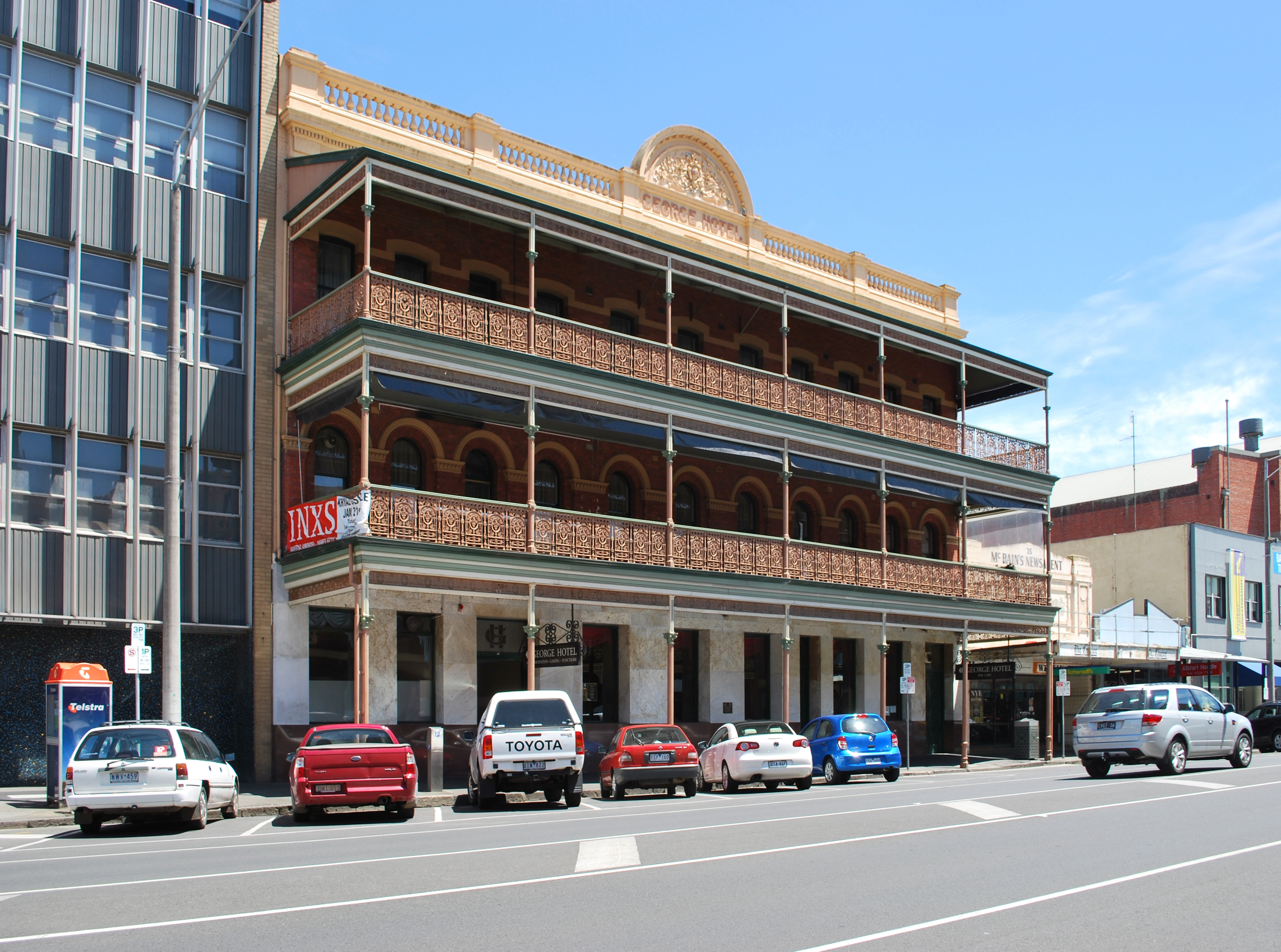
George Hotel, Ballarat (1902)

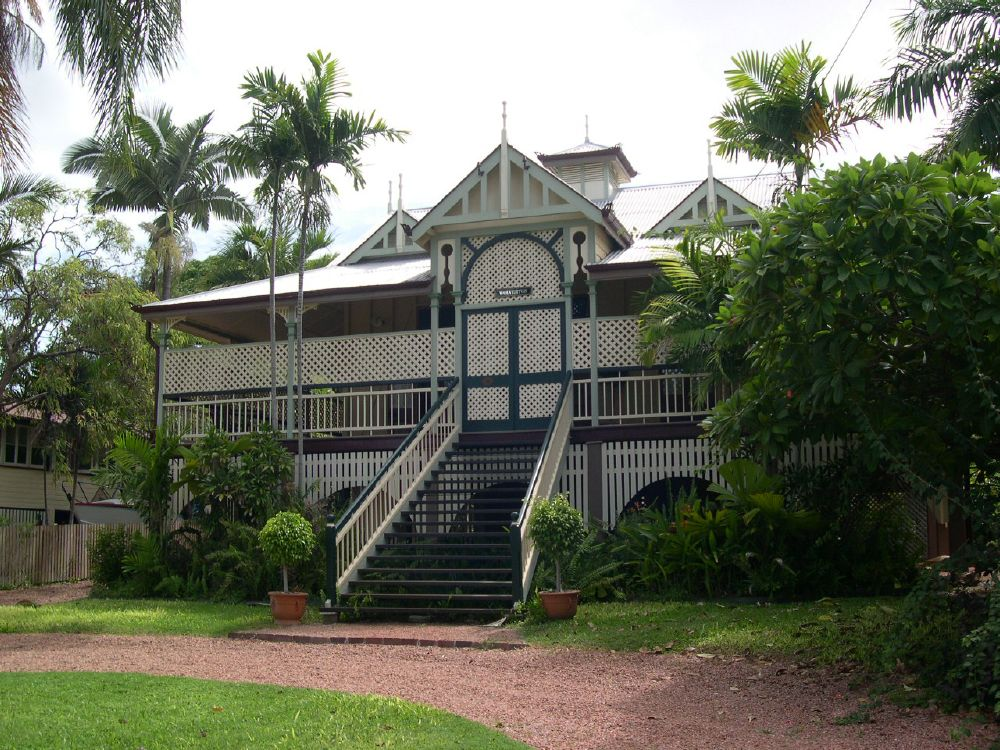
Wolverton, Townsville (1903)

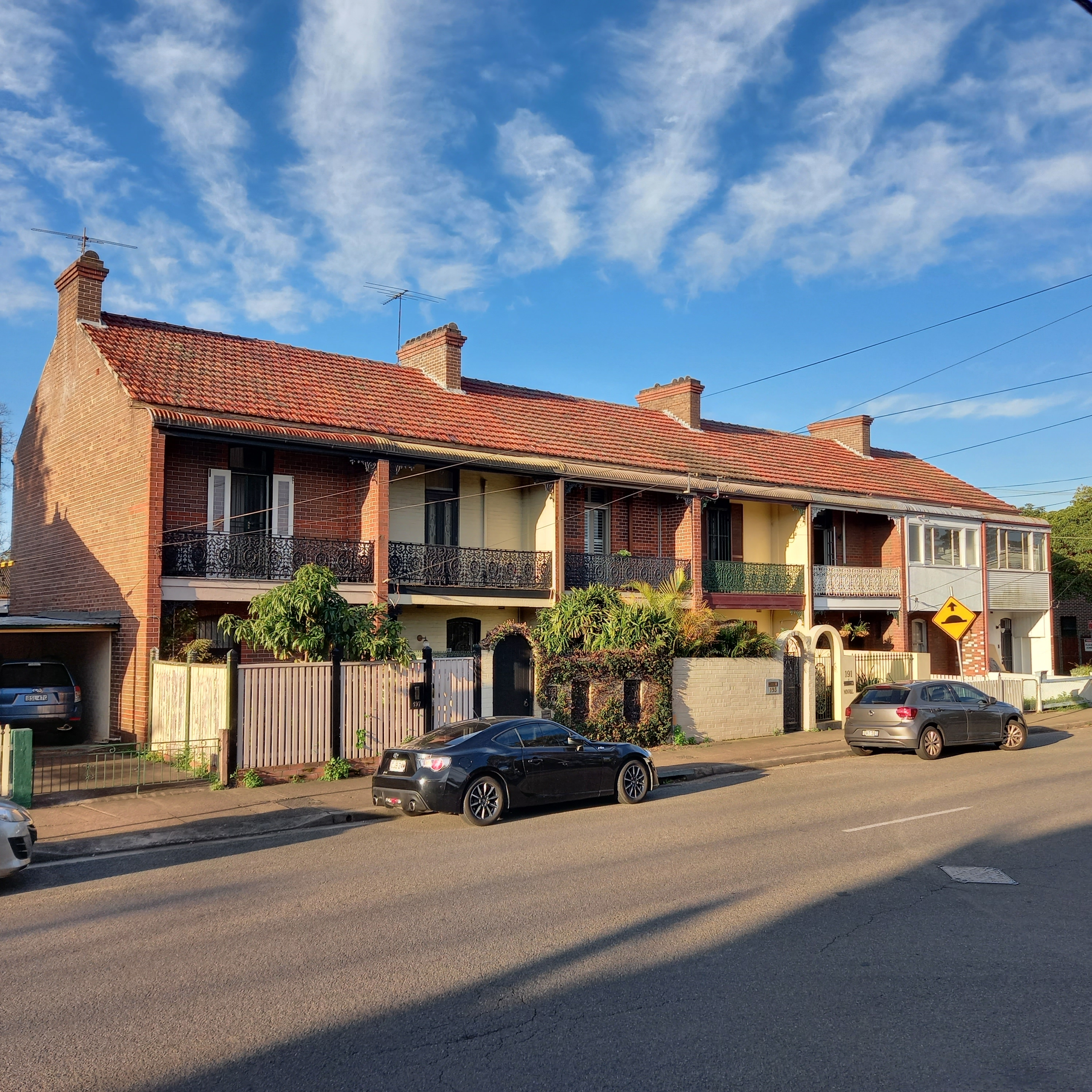
Fulham Terrace, Croydon (1904)

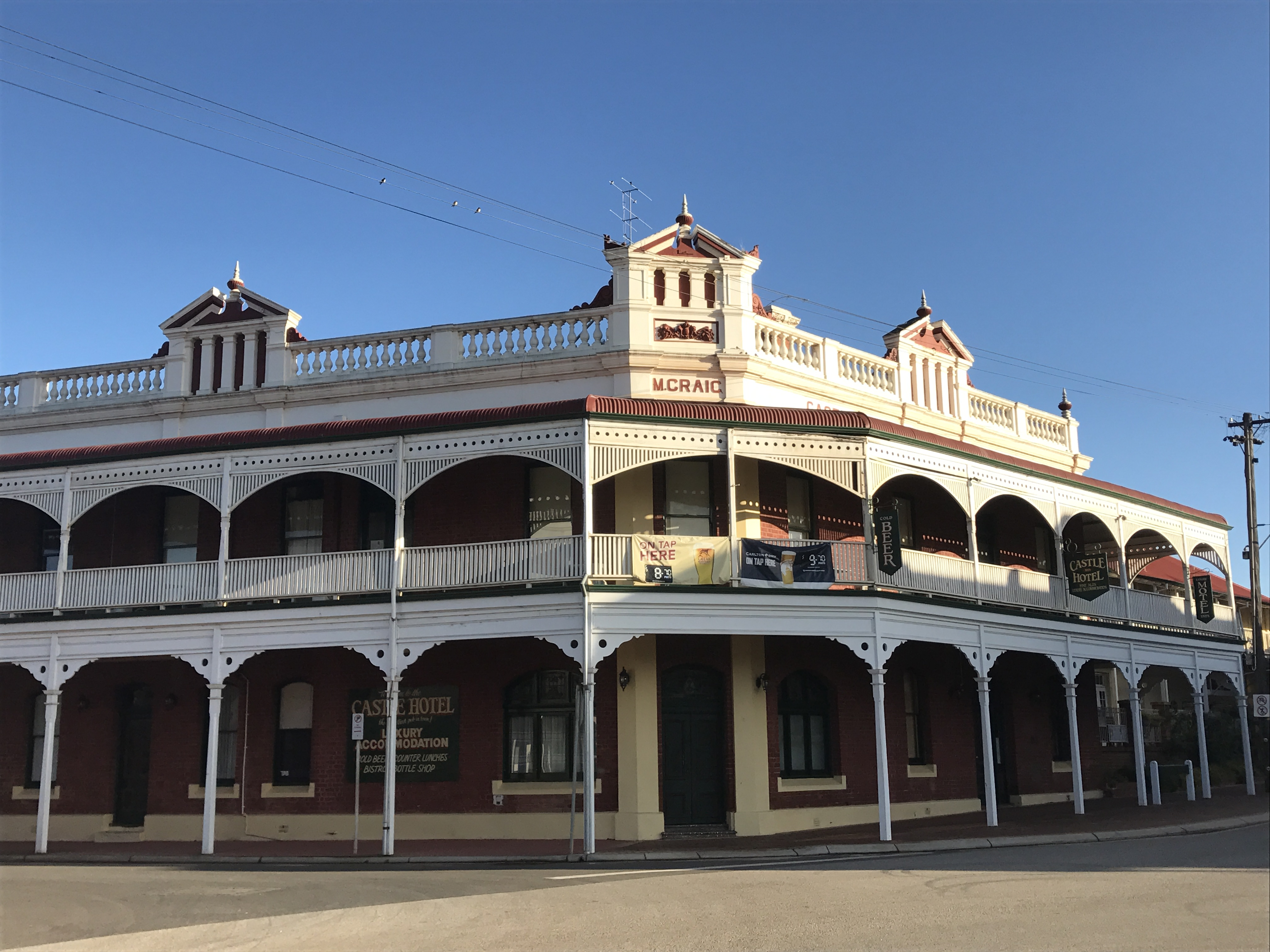
Castle Hotel, York (c. 1905)

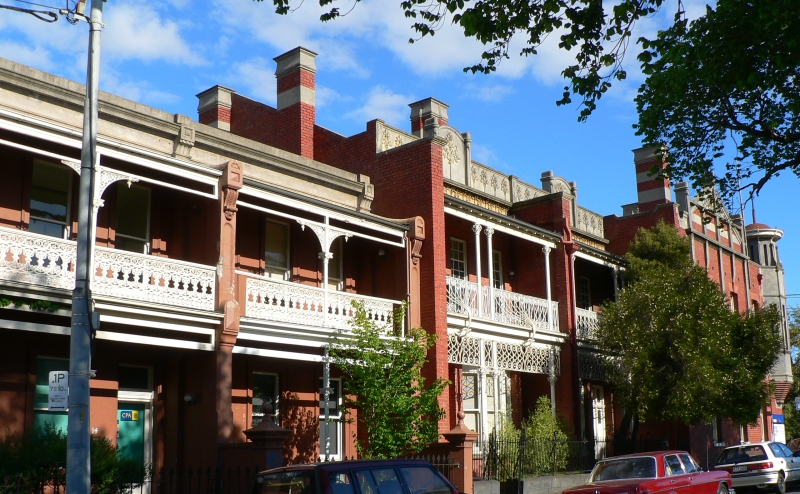
Eastbourne House and terraces, East Melbourne (1906). A private hospital with an attached terrace pair, likely designed by Robert Haddon.

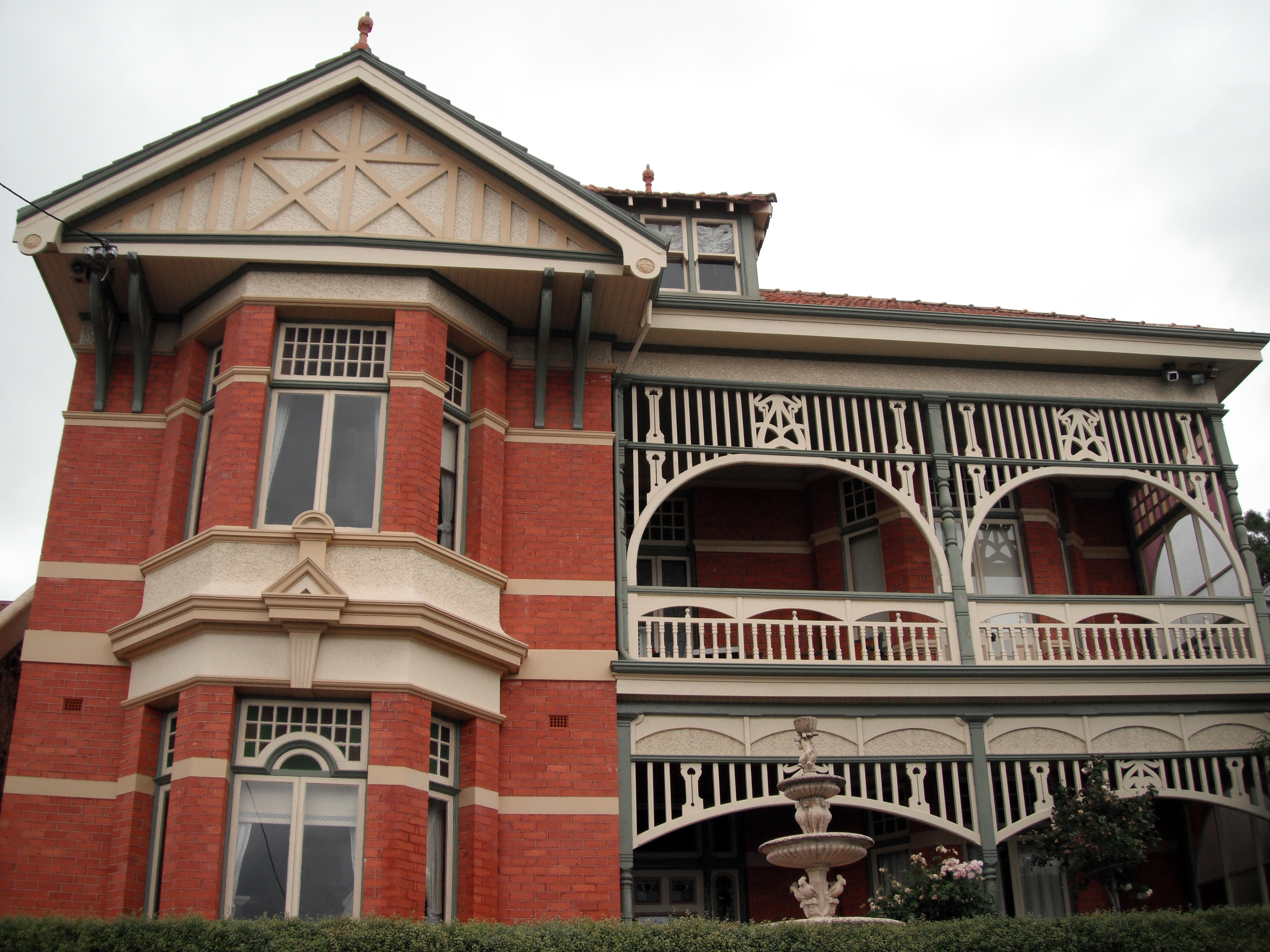
Werona, Launceston (1908)

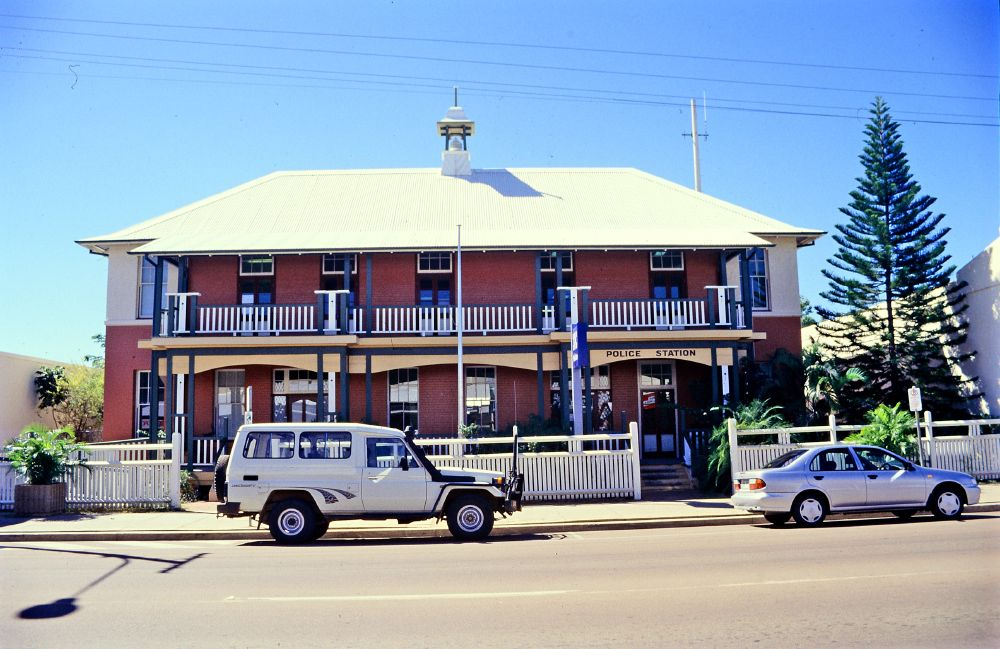
Charters Towers Police Station (1910), architect Thomas Pye

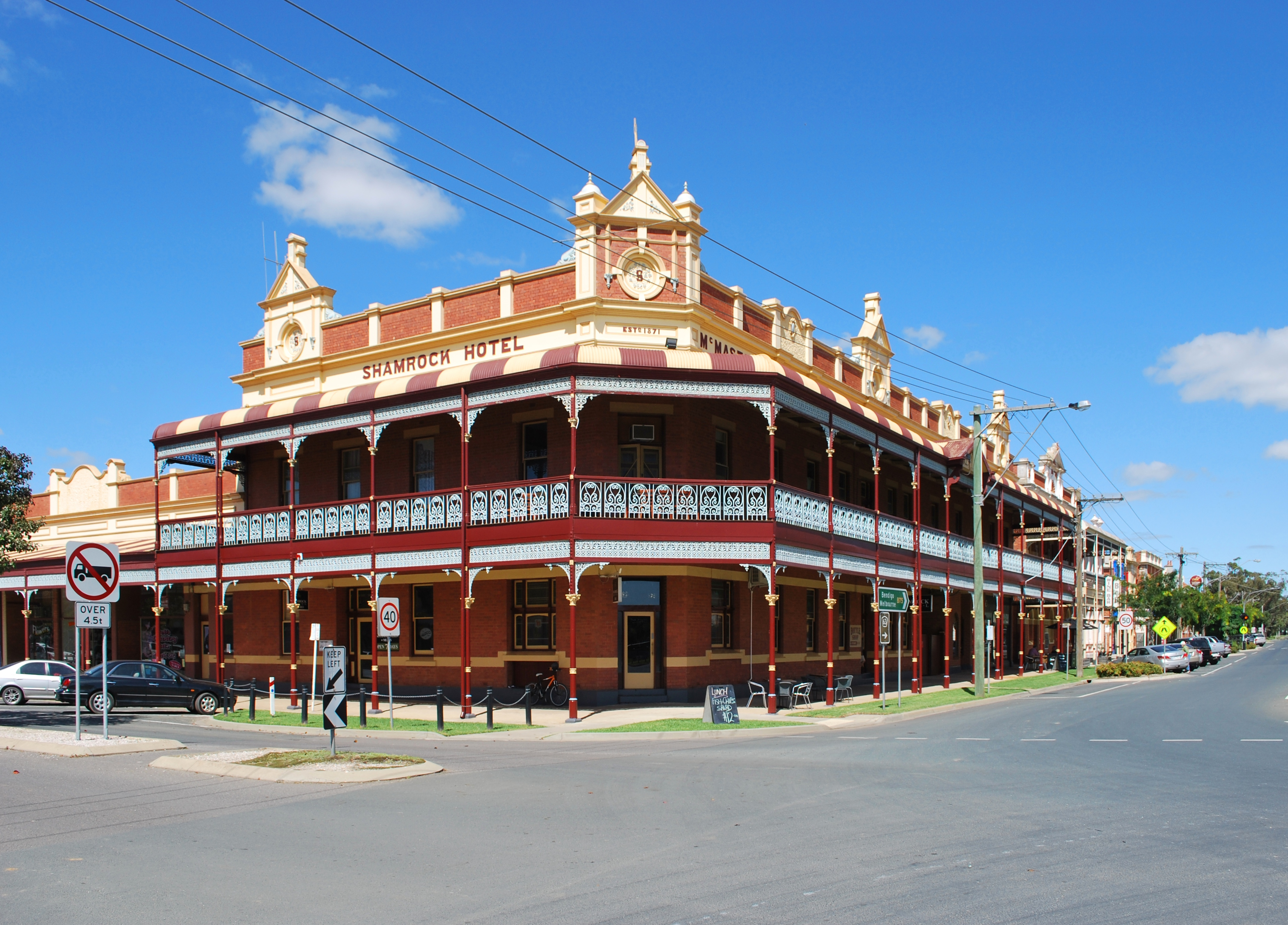
Shamrock Hotel, Rochester (c. 1912)

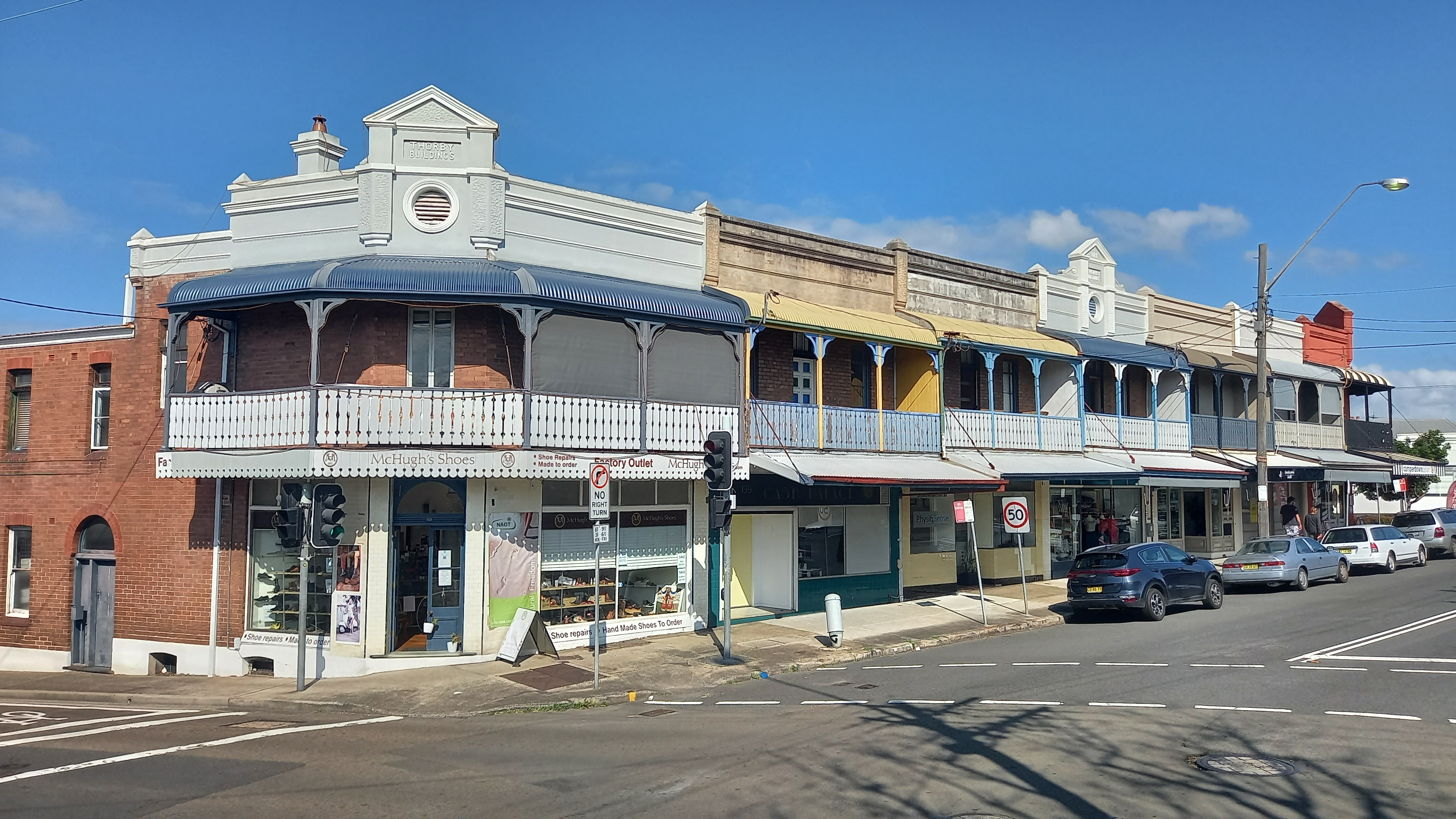
Thorby Buildings, Leichhardt (1912)

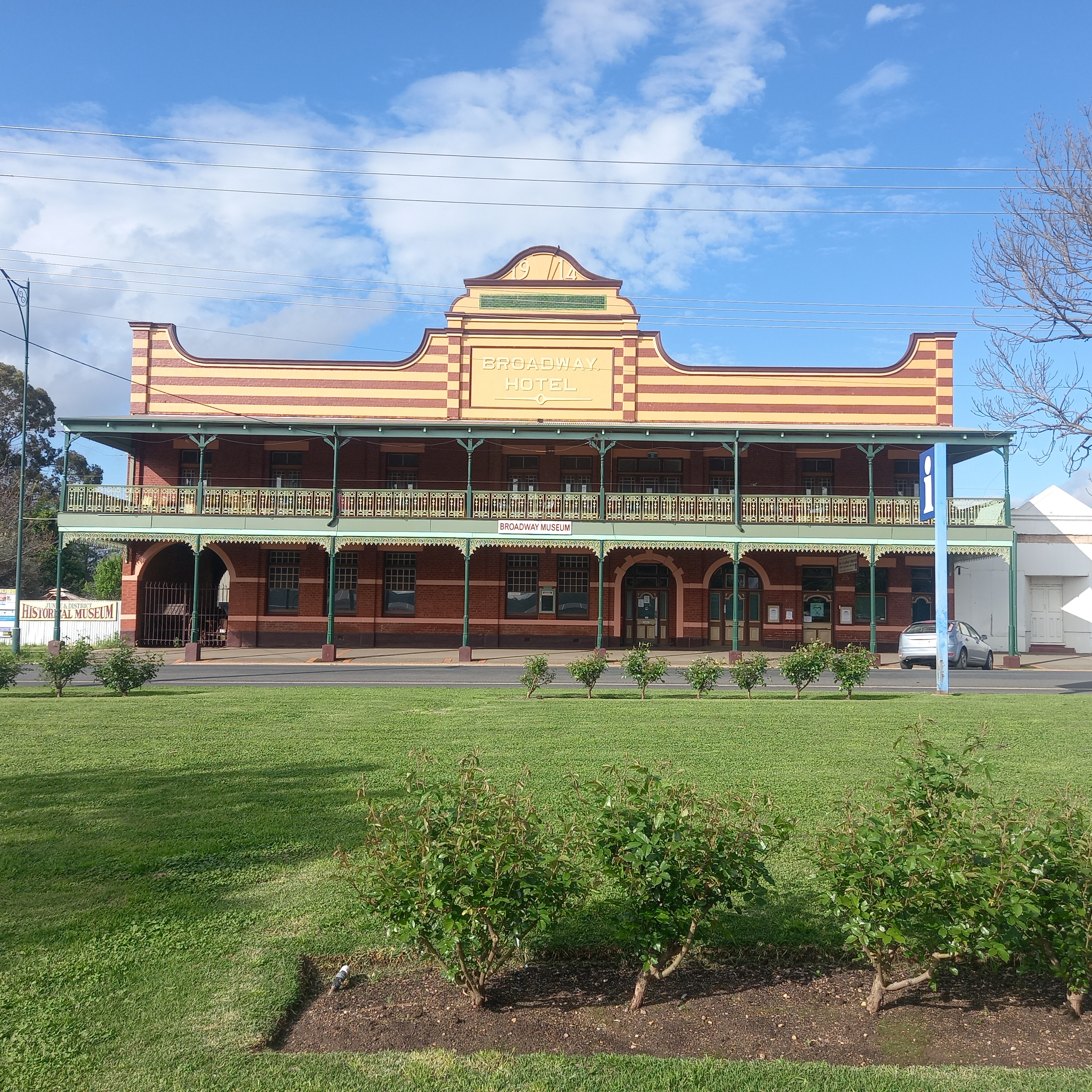
Broadway Hotel, Junee (1914)

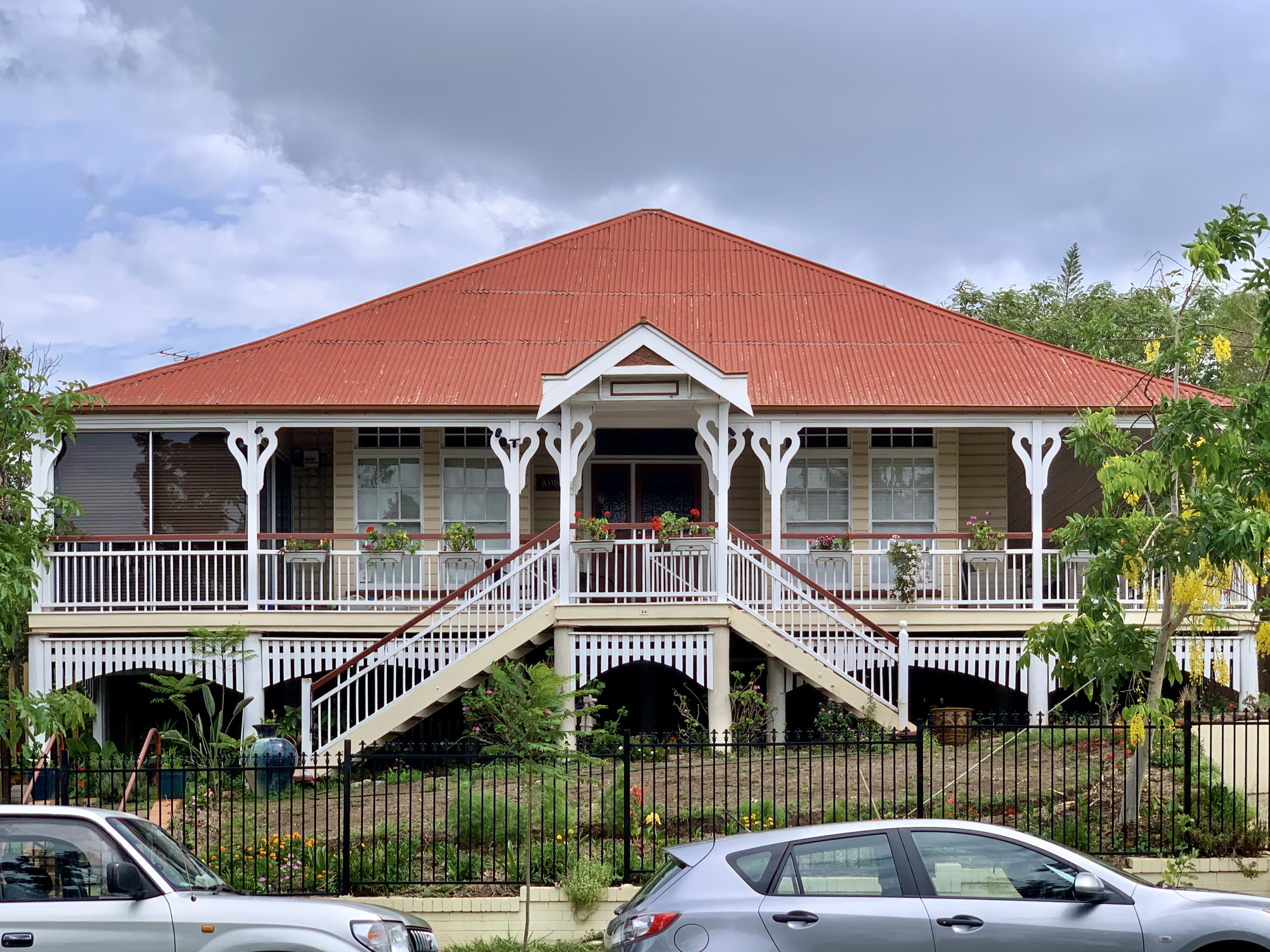
Kameruka, Ipswich (1917). Federation Filigree style Queenslander with double access stairs.

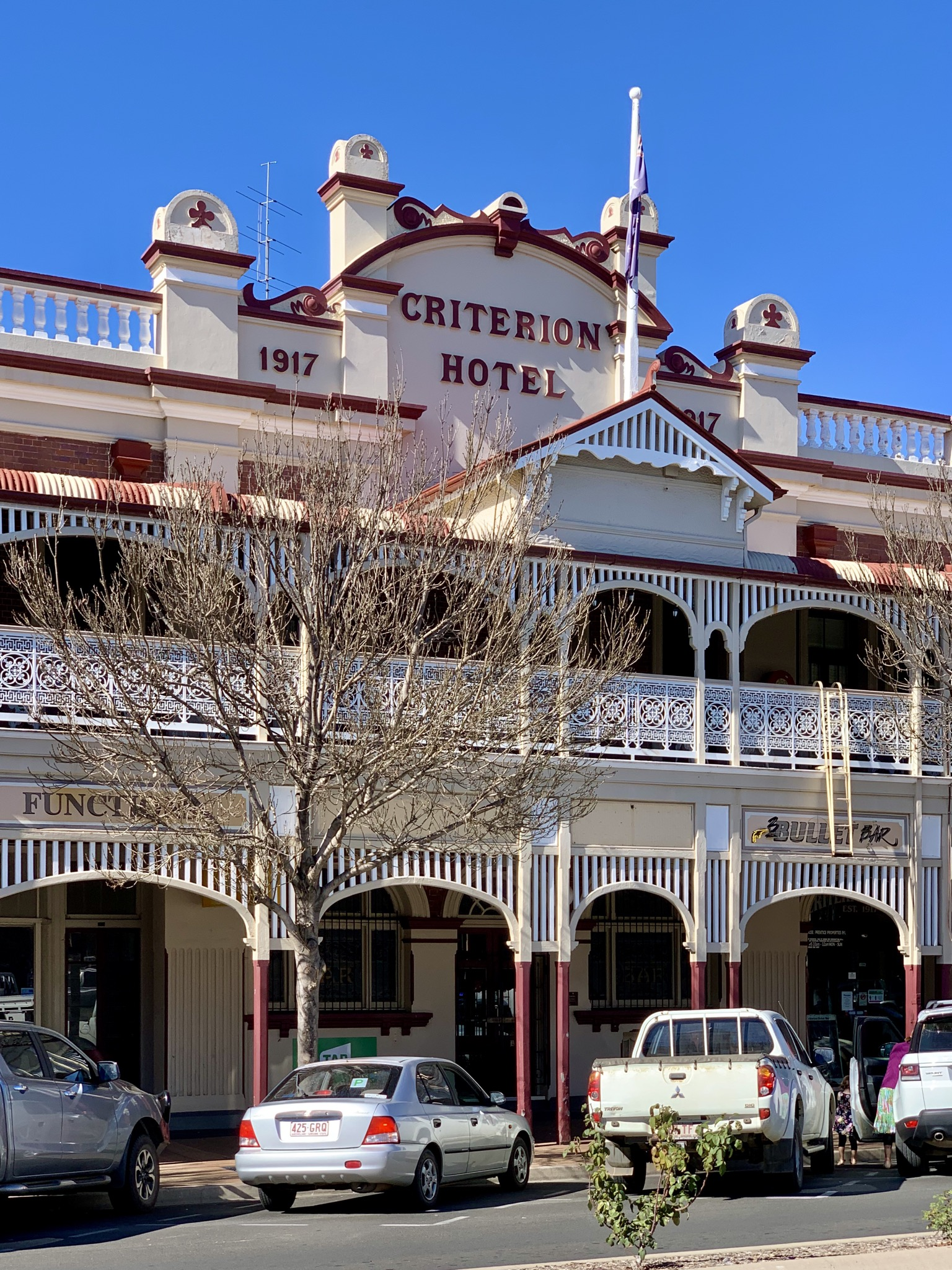
Criterion Hotel, Warwick (1917)

== Bibliography ==
- Apperly, Richard; Irving, Robert; Reynolds, Peter A Pictorial Guide to Identifying Australian Architecture: Styles and Terms from 1788 to the Present, 1989, Angus & Robertson ISBN 0-207-18562-X
- Howells, Trevor; Morris, Colleen The Terrace Houses in Australia, 1999, Lansdowne Publishing, ISBN 1-86302-649-5
- Turner, Brian Australia's Iron Lace, 1985, Allen & Unwin ISBN 0-86861-481-5
- Turner, Brian The Australian Terrace House, 1995, Angus & Robertson, ISBN 0-207-18663-4
- Robertson, E. Graeme Sydney Lace, 1962, Georgian House, Melbourne
- Robertson, E. Graeme Adelaide Lace, 1973, Rigby
- Robertson, E. Graeme; Robertson, Joan Decorative Cast Iron In Australia, 1984, Currey O'Neil Ross, ISBN 0-670-90253-5
