= Oswald Bond Store =

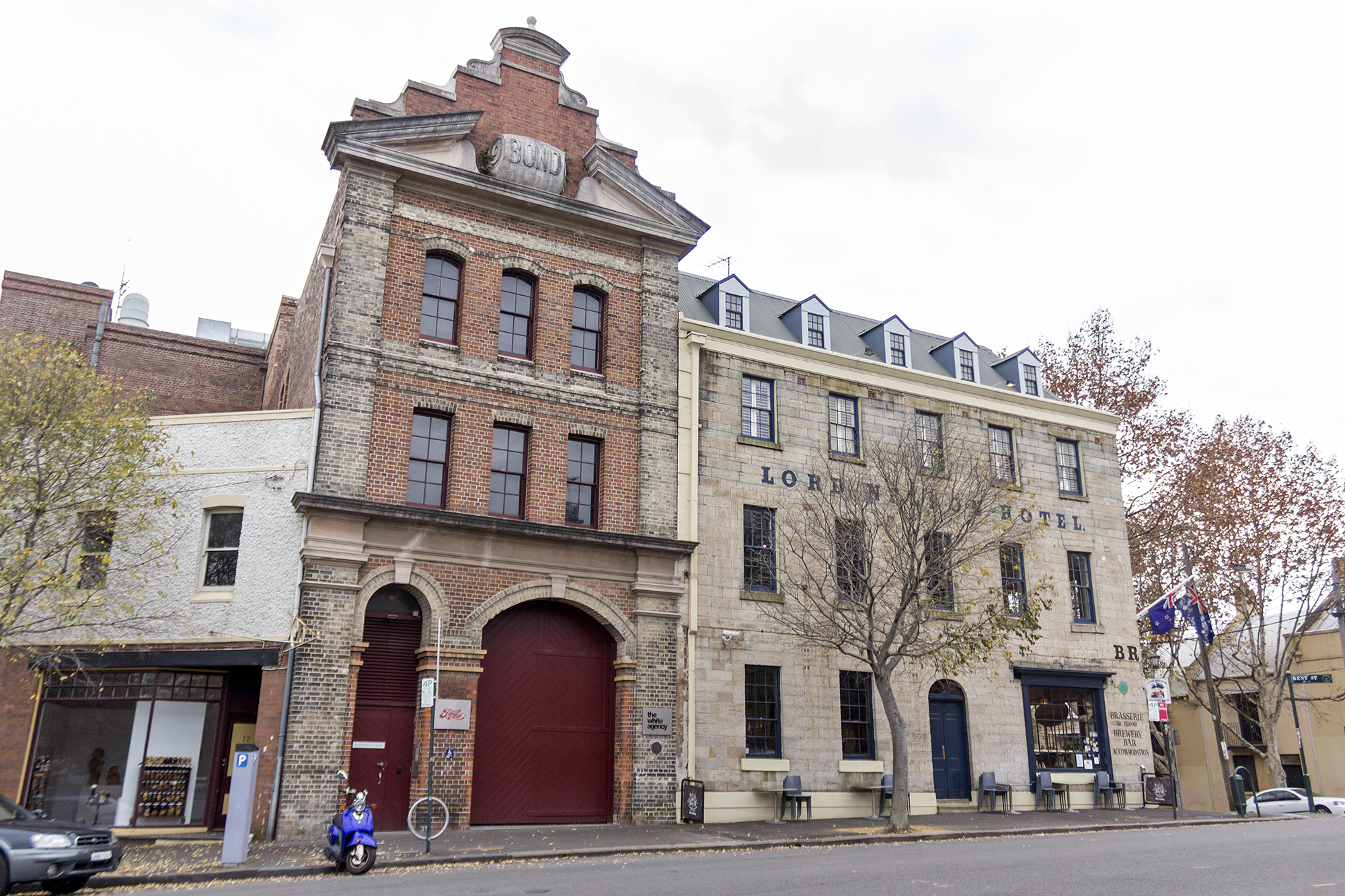
- The former Oswald Bond Store, to the left of the Lord Nelson Hotel

- Location within Sydney Location within Australia
- 33.8580°S 151.2031°E
- Location: 1–17 Kent Street, Millers Point, City of Sydney, New South Wales, Australia

History
- Built: 1892 and 1903

Site notes
- Architect(s): A. L. & G. McCredie
- Architectural style: Federation Free Classical

New South Wales Heritage Register
- Official name: Oswald Bond Store; Hentsch's Bond Store
- Type: State heritage (built)
- Designated: 2 April 1999
- Reference no.: 527
- Type: Warehouse/storage area
- Category: Commercial
- Builders: J. R. Locke

The Oswald Bond Store is a heritage-listed former wool bond store and now offices at 1–17 Kent Street, in the inner city Sydney suburb of Millers Point in the City of Sydney local government area of New South Wales, Australia. It was designed by A. L. & G. McCredie and built by J. R. Locke. It is also known as Hentsch's Bond Store. It was added to the New South Wales State Heritage Register on 2 April 1999.

== History ==
The Oswald Bond Store is situated on a block of land bounded by Kent Street, Windmill Street and Argyle Street on the east, north & west and south respectively. The block is rhomboid in shape and in the south-east corner is the Lord Nelson Hotel. It was erected in 1892, later badly damaged by fire in 1903 and rebuilt immediately in mostly the same style.

The site is situated on high ground falling steeply away to the north; the western end was named Walsh Bay in 1919. To the west and south the land is elevated. This is of strategic importance as it is adjacent to Walsh Bay, the Millers Point promontory and the northernmost past of Darling Harbour to the east. The road is also significant as the Bond Store site stands at the conjunction of three important roads.

In 1834 a Land Commission was set up by the government to sort out the tangle of Crown grants, permissive occupancy and squatting, characterising Sydney's land pattern. The Millers Point district was a large area of such problems. In 1836 the commission made William Wells the owner of section 92 allotment 15. Wells erected the Lord Nelson, adjacent to the now Bond Store and a landmark of the district. By the 1850s the rhomboid block on which the Bond Store now stands became occupied by local mariners and tradesmen.

The 1880s began a period of significant change at Millers Point as the shipping patterns were altered - the size and frequency increased as the wool trade boomed. The town became primarily a place for a working class population as the wealthy mercantile families moved to suburbs. There were plans to embark on wharf reconstruction, which would be reinforced by the building of a range of bond and wool stores on the higher ground behind the renovated and enlarged wharves. The block was an obvious location for bond stores as it stood on several streets and was close to the wharves. Sydney Storage Company employed architects for a new bond store, which would be later known as the Oswald Bond Store, on lots 14-15 of the block. It was designed to occupy the whole of the eastern side of the block.

On 31 May 1901 the newly formed Sydney Harbour Trust (set up in order to control the spread of the bubonic plague through rats) resumed the entire block including the Bond Store.

A significant date in the history of the Bond Store was Friday 20 March 1903. A fire broke out in one of the upper rooms when the building was unattended, damaging much of the property as it then stood. There was no loss of life in the fire and little property damage beyond the Bond Store, but the fire had spread rapidly due to the vast window space and open lifts. The Kent Street Wall and Windmill Street Wall were partially saved, but the interior was completely destroyed. The cause of the fire was unknown.

It was agreed by the Commissioners that they would rebuild the store in substantially the same style and form. The Trust was content to give an appearance of continuity by rebuilding in the traditional late-Victorian warehouse style. Their intention was to make the store "up-to-date" and essentially fireproof. Therefore, in rebuilding it, the structure was reduced to 5 storeys, and its north front was extended along the full length of Windmill Street. The Lord Nelson was to remain intact.

In 1904 it became known as the Oswald Bond Store, built to its original detail, but without the two upper floors. The lifts were replaced and in addition concrete fire stairs were installed. Some window openings were replaced with a brick infill to reduce the risk of fire spreading due to excessive fenestration.

The Oswald Bond Store was reopened for business in March 1904. By 1905 there were complaints made that the Store was competing too successfully with the stores controlled directly by the commissioners.

== Description ==
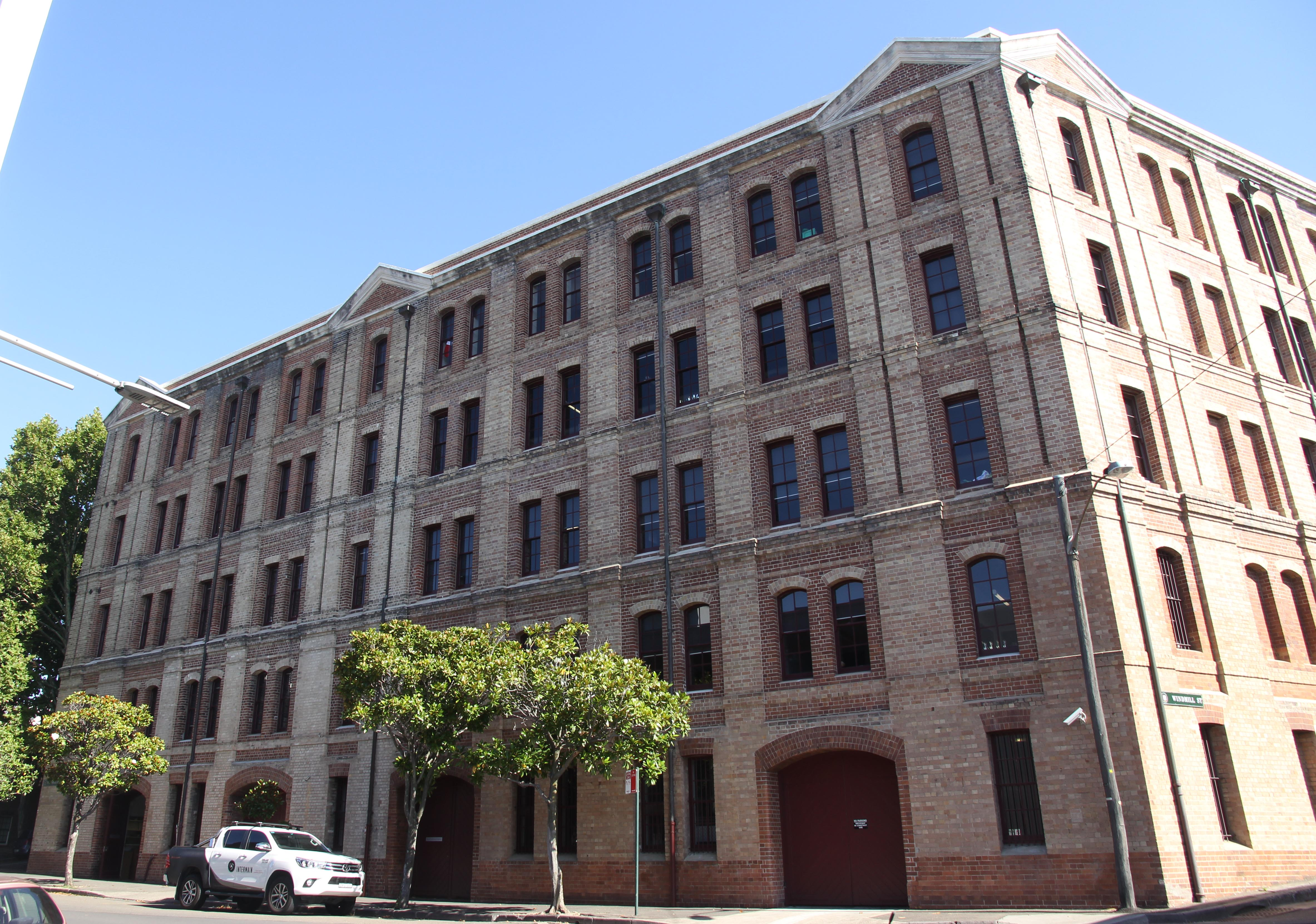
Oswald Bond Store, pictured from Windmill Street in January 2019.

The Bond Store is an example of late Victorian (1892–93 facades) / Federation Free Classical (1904) style warehouse structure. The existing building is essentially in sound condition, although there is some cracking and water damage identified on Level 3. Only part of the original 1892–1893 brickwork facades survived the 1903 fire. The existing building dates from 1904, when it was rebuilt to original detail after the fire, with the omission of the two upper levels and with other fire-prevention measures. The internal timber structure was rebuilt using the original storey post system.

The Australian Builder and Contractors News of September 1892 stated of the original Bond Store prior to the 1903 fire that "The facades, of sensible and tasteful design, are of colonial brick, with cement mouldings and dressings the construction generally is of brick, with iron-bark storey-posts and girders, hardware joists and floors and galvanised iron roofing".

The building is irregular in shape and has sandstone kerbing. It is a prominent landscape as a streetscape and can be viewed from many major locations, including Observation Hill, Sydney Harbour Bridge and Darling Harbour.

External timber doors open out onto Windmill, Argyle and Kent Street and provide access to the courtyard. These doors were adapted to be mechanically operable in the 1980s.

The external structure is brick on the lower levels, Level 5 is reinforced concrete and set back from the facades, massive brick walls separate the interior spaces. On levels 1 to 3, timber floorboards rest on herringbone strutted joists, which in turn are supported by large timber floor beams. Levels 4-5 are of recent construction though original and early brick external facades and pediment have been retained.

=== Modifications and dates ===
The early internal structure comprises solid brick walls and hardwood storey posts on sandstone footings, hardwood beams and deck. Storey posts on upper floors were destroyed in the 1903 fire. External timber doors on Kent, Windmill and Argyle Streets originally provided access through driveways into the courtyard where the atrium space now is. Of these driveways, only two have been retained since the late 1980s major refurbishment works for access to the basement car park.

The late 1980s works converted it to office uses and included reconstruction of two upper floors (4 & 5). The early post system was retained but reinforced with a concrete and steel structure supporting a new concrete and steel storey previously known as Level 5 (now 4), which was set back from the original store facades. The atrium dates from then too and involved glazing over the "roof" space of the courtyard, new large glazed openings with concrete heads and lintels to internal brick walls. These works included new services and extension into a previously undeveloped western portion of the site. This portion is the current lift lobby with fire stair, services rooms and two modern lifts with motor room. The building has been significantly partitioned on the upper levels for corporate tenants under previous ownership and generally consists of plaster board on stud frames, glazed partition walls, suspended ceilings to some rooms and workstations. These are the subject of the current internal strip out to bring the building to its warehouse special qualities.

Where there are no ceilings, the underside of joists are exposed with herringbone strutting. The main roof was altered by the late 1980s refurbishment works and is sheeted with metal; however the lower Argyle Street wing features a slate roof. Originally there were four hydraulic lifts, one of which has been preserved and another has been partly retained. Modern stairs have been installed between levels 4 & 5.

== Heritage listing ==
The Oswald Bond Store is of State significance as an outstanding example of a turn of the century bond store in the Free Classical style. The Store has a strong architectural presence, its scale and facade contributing to the streetscape. The timber driveway doors are part of a rare avenue of industrial openings along Windmill Street, which are a reminder of the commercial use of the area. The storey post system supporting the internal floors is typical of the construction of the Sydney Harbour Trust during this period.

Oswald Bond Store was listed on the New South Wales State Heritage Register on 2 April 1999 having satisfied the following criteria.

The place is important in demonstrating the principal characteristics of a class of cultural or natural places/environments in New South Wales.

It is an example of a warehouse in the Victorian/Federation Free Classical style. It contains intricate architecture of the time including sandstone kerbing and guttering, examples of original and early polychromatic brickwork facades with sandstone detailing.

The internal structures are typical of the construction style of the Sydney Harbour Trust.

== See also ==
- Australian non-residential architectural styles
