= 75–77 Lower Fort Street, Millers Point =

75–77 Lower Fort Street
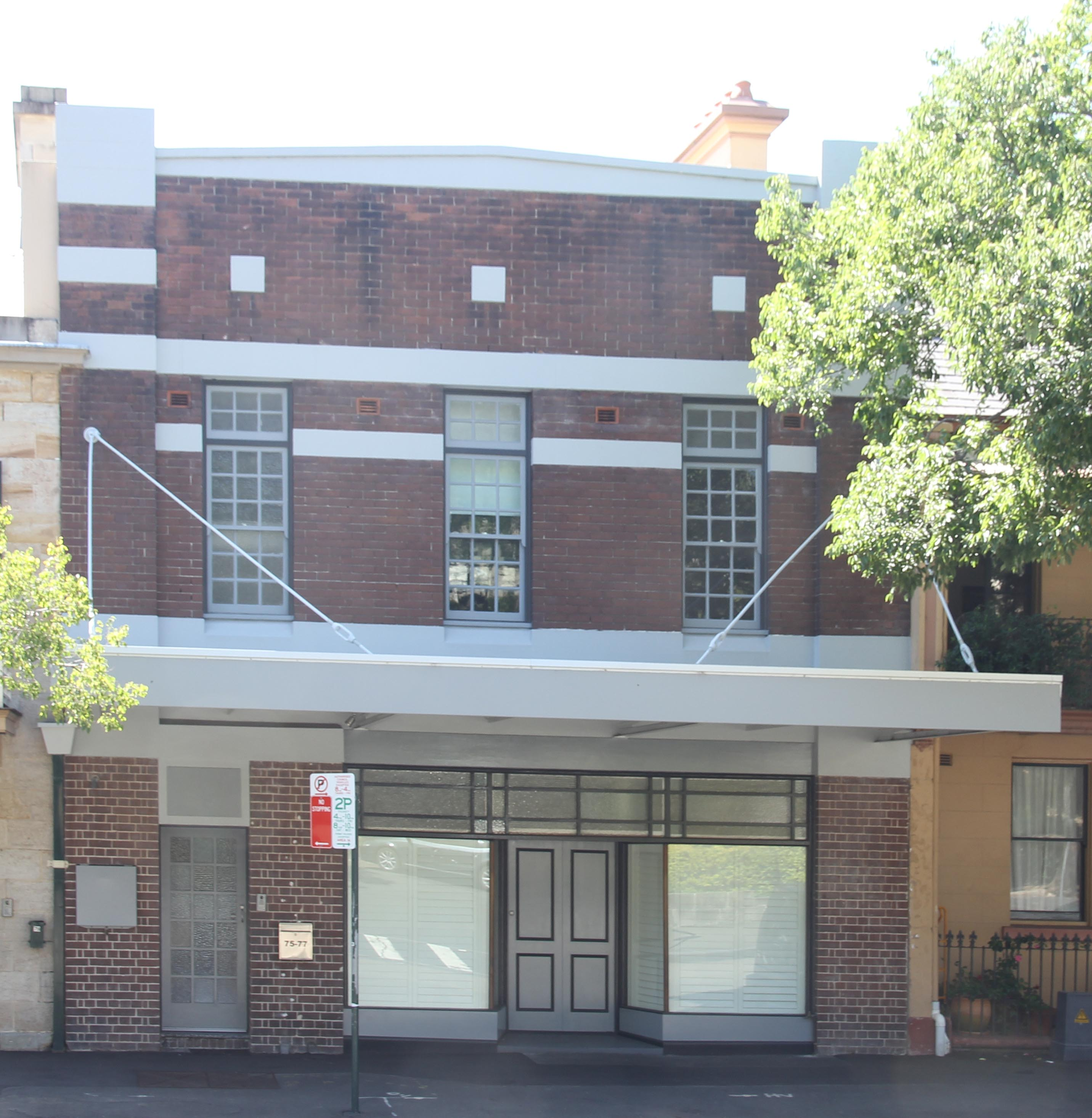
- 75–77 Lower Fort Street, pictured in 2019

- Location within Sydney Location within Australia
- 33.8574°S 151.2061°E
- Location: 75, 77 Lower Fort Street, Millers Point, City of Sydney, New South Wales, Australia

History
- Built: 1928

Site notes
- Architectural style: Inter-war Free Classical

New South Wales Heritage Register
- Official name: Building
- Type: State heritage (built)
- Designated: 2 April 1999
- Reference no.: 844
- Type: Historic site

75–77 Lower Fort Street is a heritage-listed shop and residence located at 75 and 77 Lower Fort Street, in the inner city Sydney suburb of Millers Point, in the City of Sydney local government area of New South Wales, Australia. It was added to the New South Wales State Heritage Register on 2 April 1999.

== History ==
The coastal Aboriginal people around Sydney are known as the Eora people, and central Sydney is therefore often referred to as "Eora country". Within the City of Sydney local government area, the traditional owners are the Cadigal and Wangal bands of the Eora. With the European invasion of the Sydney region, the Cadigal and Wangal people were decimated, but there are descendants still living in Sydney today.

The site consists of the northern portion of the grant made to William Hutchinson and confirmed by the Lands Commissioners in 1836. William Hutchinson, an emancipist, was Superintendent of Convicts and a large-scale landowner and businessman in Sydney. He acquired considerable holdings at Millers Point, including an allotment along Pottinger Street. The northern end of this allotment joined the allotment on which numbers 75–77 were to stand.

The Lower Fort Street allotment was on land which fell away steeply towards the later Walsh Bay. Its northern end became the site of portion of Downshire Street. From the late 1830s, this street formed the effective northern boundary, as it still does.

In 1840–41, the site of number 79 was built on. A handsome two-storey (with basement) public house was erected by Joseph Faris on Hutchinson's land. Called the Young Princess, it was renamed the Whaler's Arms by 1847. The public house features prominently in John Rae's well-known picture of Millers Point. Though dated as 1842, the picture can be no earlier than 1845 Rae's picture shows the site of numbers 75–77 as vacant, with a low brick wall on the Lower Fort Street frontage. This is confirmed by later maps, which indicate only a few sheds on the land.

It is evident from Rae's picture of the corner public house that this building was intended for an extension to the north along Lower Fort Street. It was not uncommon to have a corner inn or store joined to a row of terrace houses. The subject site was used as a vacant yard and housed some temporary structures such as sheds and stabling, but the sloping nature of the site was not well suited for this use.

The site remained vacant, save for temporary structures until 1928, when the Sydney Harbour Trust constructed the existing shop and residence. The building was used as a shop and residence from its date of construction until December 2011.

The enclosed verandah to the rear of the building at ground floor level was added in 1937.

== Description ==
An Inter-war Free Classical style building with external walls of dark red-brown face brick and decorated with rendered and painted bands and parapet detailing. It was built as a shop and residence with garage underneath. It reads as two storeys facing Lower Fort Street and three storeys to Downshire Street.

At ground floor level fronting Lower Fort Street is a glazed shopfront with central recessed door opening. The shopfront takes up most of the ground floor facade area and on its southern side there is a timber framed glazed entry door to the residence. An original suspended, riveted steel awning projects across the entire front elevation of the building.

The first floor has three double hung nine pane sash windows with transom lights above. There is a high parapet concealing the skillion roof.

The rear western elevation features common brickwork with decorative brickwork over the openings. At ground floor level there is timber enclosed verandah. There are three double hung windows with multi-paned sashes at first floor level. Below the verandah is the original garage door opening and timber window to the existing laundry.

The main internal spaces of the building at all three levels are largely intact. Significant internal fabric includes the original and early doors and timber joinery, fireplaces, timber fretwork stair rails, timber flooring, compressed composite fibre boarded ceilings with timber straps and rolled steel joists.

== Significance ==
No. 75–77 Lower Fort Street is a rare surviving example of a purpose designed and built Inter-War Period Free Classical Style shop and residence. With the Hero of Waterloo Hotel at No. 81–83, and its neighbour at 79 Lower Fort Street, it represents the commercial-retail hub that played an important part in servicing the local community. The building has social significance as it has been used for its intended purpose as a local shop and residence continuously for 83 years (from 1928 until 2011) serving the local community. It demonstrates the intervention of the Sydney Harbour Trust in promoting local community facilities in the context of the major reconstruction works undertaken following the outbreak of the bubonic plague. This purpose built retail and residential building is an important component in the long line of important structures along the western side of Lower Fort Street which have contributed to the character of the State significant Millers Point Conservation Area.

== Heritage listing ==
75–77 Lower Fort Street was listed on the New South Wales State Heritage Register on 2 April 1999.

== See also ==
- Eagleton Terrace, 67–73 Lower Fort Street
- 79 Lower Fort Street
