= 79 Lower Fort Street, Millers Point =

79 Lower Fort Street
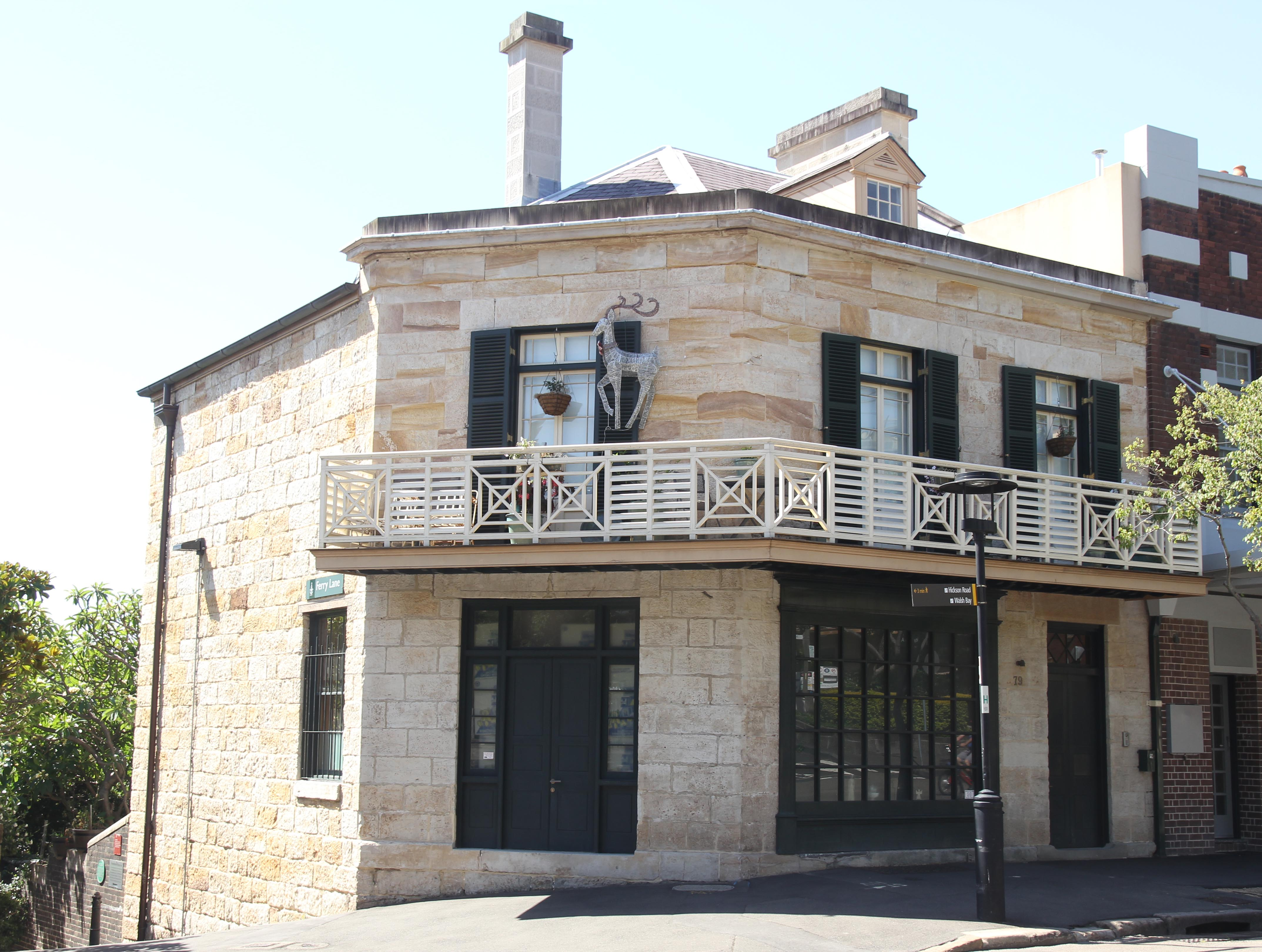
- 79 Lower Fort Street, pictured in 2019

- Location within Sydney Location within Australia
- 33.8574°S 151.2060°E
- Location: 79 Lower Fort Street, Millers Point, City of Sydney, New South Wales, Australia

History
- Built: 1842

New South Wales Heritage Register
- Official name: Shop & Residence; Hotel
- Type: State heritage (built)
- Designated: 2 April 1999
- Reference no.: 893
- Type: Historic site

79 Lower Fort Street is a heritage-listed former hotel and now shop and residence at 79 Lower Fort Street, Millers Point, City of Sydney, New South Wales, Australia. It was built in 1842 as a hotel, and variously traded as a hotel or shop until 1870, after which time it operated solely as a shop. It was variously known as the Young Princess Hotel, Whalers Arms Hotel and Brown's Family Hotel in its licensed years. It was added to the New South Wales State Heritage Register on 2 April 1999.

== History ==
The coastal Aboriginal people around Sydney are known as the Eora people, and central Sydney is therefore often referred to as "Eora country". Within the City of Sydney local government area, the traditional owners are the Cadigal and Wangal bands of the Eora. With the European invasion of the Sydney region, the Cadigal and Wangal people were decimated, but there are descendants still living in Sydney today.

The building was constructed by an unknown builder as the ‘Young Princess’ inn circa 1840 and by 1847 was known as ‘The Whalers Arms’. The first licensee was Joseph Farris. The ‘Young Princess’ was a handsome and commodious structure, as Rae's painting of 1842 made clear. However, its rival on the opposite corner, the Hero of Waterloo Hotel, was larger and better equipped. Two more inns existed just along from it, on the south side of Windmill Street, and other inns (including the two other ‘Whalers Arms’) proliferated all over the Millers Point area. The rivalry between inns was intense.

It is unclear how long the ‘Whalers Arms’ continued to trade as a public house as there were gaps in the licensing magistrates’ records. The 1855 City assessment returns show the property as a shop run by Mrs Isabella Brown. With a growing residential population in the now-crowded ‘Rocks’ area, the retail trade needed as many outlets as the liquor and accommodation trades. The following fifteen years found the No. 79 building alternating between these two characteristic occupations. In 1855 and 1858 it was a grocer's shop. With a renewed licence, the building became the ‘Whalers Arms’ once more in 1861, retaining its public house character until 1868. At times, the publicans seem to have been related to the occupants of the ‘Hero of Waterloo’. This became evident in 1867 when the ‘Whalers Arms’ bore the title ‘Brown’s Family Hotel’. In this capacity, it apparently acted as a residential annexe to the ‘Hero of Waterloo’. This restrained aspect of the hostelry business did not long endure and from 1870 it was once more given over to groceries.

No. 79 remained a grocer's shop for the remainder of its long commercial life. Its large ground-floor room was no less useful as a repository for the large bags and boxes of stock of the traditional grocer than it had been as a tavern bar and the shop was strategically placed. Lower Fort Street was largely residential and so there was need for an all-purpose grocer. The upstairs rooms provided accommodation for the grocer's family, or a tenant.

Initially, the corner shop was the only building on the west side of Lower fort Street between Ferry Lane and the lane leading to Downshire Street. The adjacent site (Nos. 75-77) remained vacant until 1928, holding a few sheds, acting as stores and stables. The original concept of No. 79, as the commercial end of a residential terrace was never realised. When housing development did take place, it worked south from the Downshire Street lane.

From 1890 there was quite a rapid turnover of shopkeepers but then the occupancies grew longer: the bubonic plague scare, the advent of the Sydney Harbour Trust in 1901, and the reconstruction of the Walsh Bay wharves brought massive changes to the area. No. 79 now had a new proprietor, the Trust, but otherwise it continued as before. Much of Windmill Street was altered and new housing appeared on the east side of Lower Fort Street. The building of the Sydney Harbour Bridge approach from 1925 created a great barrier. Socially, the local population changed substantially, from the family unit to the occupiers of the numerous boarding houses in the area. Demand for groceries was steady but not large, especially with a large array of shops in Kent Street and Circular Quay West.

Following the decision to retain the Rocks and Millers Point for its cultural significance the building passed into the ownership of the State Government and eventually to the NSW Land and Housing Corporation. In the last decade of the 20th century the building ceased to be occupied and was subject to vandalism and the ravages of a severe white ant infestation. A 99-year lease was purchased in 2005.

== Description ==
79 Lower Fort Street is a sandstone two-storey corner building with attic variously described as being in the early Victorian Regency or Old Colonial Georgian styles. It has stone walls, a slate roof (replacing an original shingle roof) and painted timber joinery.

It retains some of its original Georgian features; however, there is evidence of many changes to window and door locations and sizes. Surviving fabric contains evidence of original features including joinery to the ground floor window on the east facade, the original balcony to the first floor, original "The Whalers Arms" signage emerging from below peeling paintwork to the cornice, and early advertising signs painted on exterior stone walls.

The building has undergone numerous modifications. The corner window was originally a doorway. The verandah has been removed, a window infilled, stone painted, and a dormer window altered. Other structures shown on parts of the site in 1834 and 1865 surveys are no longer extant.

== Heritage listing ==
This two storey early nineteenth century sandstone corner building was formerly a hotel, and is an important streetscape element.

It is part of the Millers Point Conservation Area, an intact residential and maritime precinct. It contains residential buildings and civic spaces dating from the 1830s and is an important example of nineteenth-century adaptation of the landscape.

79 Lower Fort Street was listed on the New South Wales State Heritage Register on 2 April 1999 having satisfied the following criteria.

The place is important in demonstrating the course, or pattern, of cultural or natural history in New South Wales.

"A purpose-built corner public house, one of the many hotels that were so much a part of life at Millers Point in the early 19th century, particularly along Windmill Street. One of the few surviving buildings used as a shop, with a long history of usage. Built for William Hutchinson, emancipist, principal superintendent of convicts, land owner, pastoralist and businessman. An important community amenity. Having the potential to contribute to an understanding of several phases of the development of Miller's Point."

The place is important in demonstrating aesthetic characteristics and/or a high degree of creative or technical achievement in New South Wales.

"Fine example of a simple Georgian colonial inn building sited opposite the Hero of Waterloo. Rare surviving example of an early Georgian colonial inn and corner shop. Most important corner element, related to the Hero of Waterloo hotel opposite at the key intersection of Windmill and Lower Fort Streets."

== See also ==
- 75–77 Lower Fort Street
- Hero of Waterloo Hotel, 81–83 Lower Fort Street
- 90–92 Windmill Street
