= Vermont Terrace =

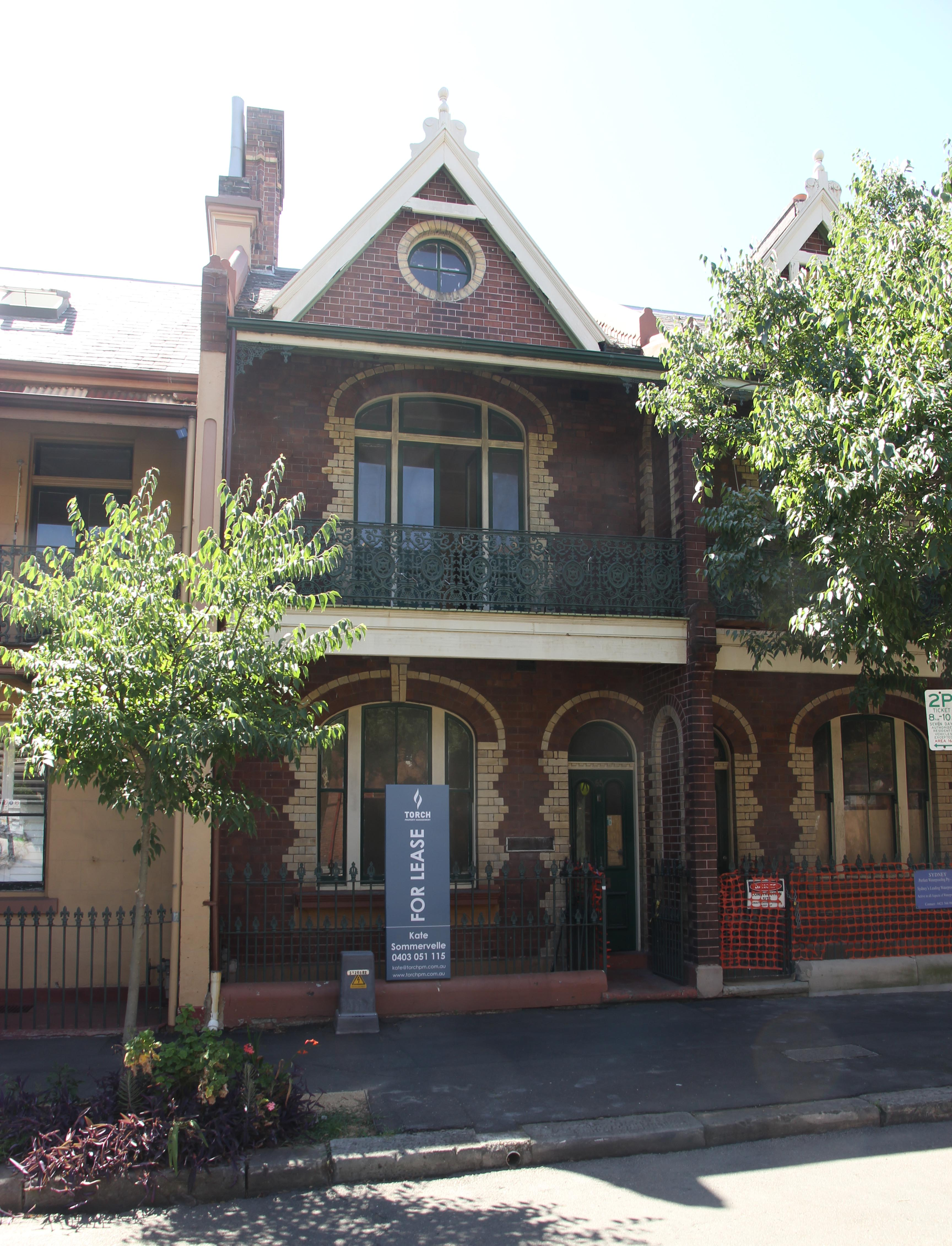
- One of the Vermont Terraces, located at 65 Lower Fort Street, Millers Point, pictured in 2019.

- Location within Sydney Location within Australia
- 33.8572°S 151.2063°E
- Location: 63 and 65 Lower Fort Street, Millers Point, City of Sydney, New South Wales, Australia

Site notes
- Architectural styles: Federation Arts and Crafts, Federation Filigree

New South Wales Heritage Register
- Official name: Vermont Terrace
- Type: State heritage (built)
- Designated: 2 April 1999
- Reference no.: 910
- Type: Terrace
- Category: Residential buildings (private)

Vermont Terrace is a heritage-listed residence at located 63–65 Lower Fort Street, in the inner city Sydney suburb of Millers Point in the City of Sydney local government area of New South Wales, Australia. The property was added to the New South Wales State Heritage Register on 2 April 1999.

== History ==
Millers Point is one of the earliest areas of European settlement in Australia, and a focus for maritime activities. This property is one of a pair of early Federation polychrome brick houses.

== Description ==
Two storey, four bedroom early Federation face brick house with attic and basement. Steeply pitched trussed timber gable to the street. Tall chimney. Highly decorative brickwork around door and windows, decorative stone sill to ground floor window. Storeys: Two; Construction: Polychrome face brick, slate, cast iron lace, and spear fence. Painted timber joinery. Style: Federation Arts and Crafts.

The external condition of the property is good.

=== Modifications and dates ===
External: External timber work modified.

== Heritage listing ==
As at 23 November 2000, this early Federation polychrome brick terrace house is an important streetscape element.

It is part of the Millers Point Conservation Area, an intact residential and maritime precinct. It contains residential buildings and civic spaces dating from the 1830s and is an important example of 19th century adaptation of the landscape.

Vermont Terrace was listed on the New South Wales State Heritage Register on 2 April 1999.

== See also ==
- Australian residential architectural styles
- Regency Townhouses, 57–61 Lower Fort Street
- Eagleton Terrace, 67–73 Lower Fort Street
