= 55 Lower Fort Street, Millers Point =

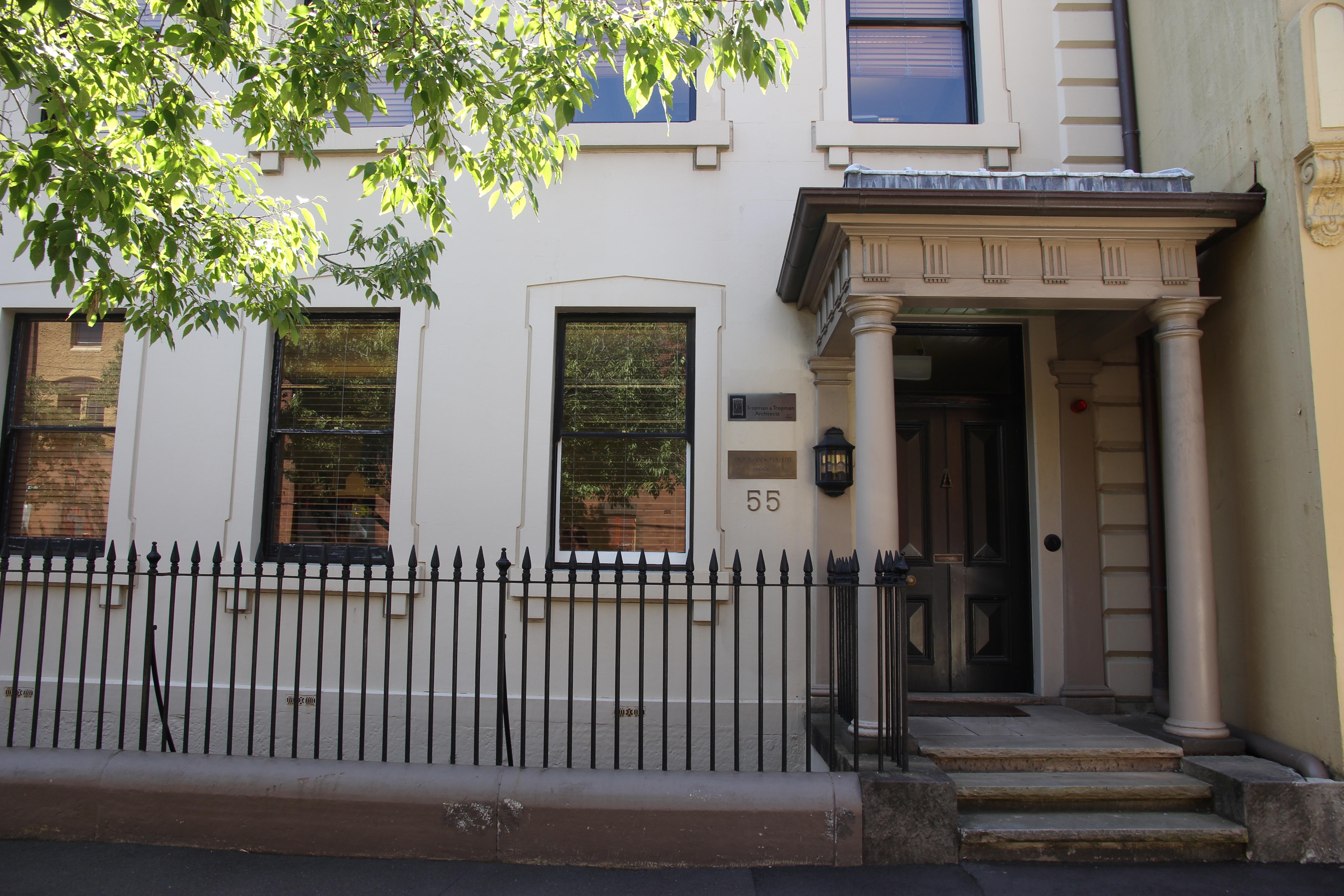
- The portico and facade of 55 Lower Fort Street, pictured in 2019.

- Location within Sydney Location within Australia
- 33.8569°S 151.2066°E
- Location: 55 Lower Fort Street, Millers Point, City of Sydney, New South Wales, Australia

Site notes
- Architectural style: Victorian Regency

New South Wales Heritage Register
- Official name: Building
- Type: State heritage (built)
- Designated: 2 April 1999
- Reference no.: 525
- Type: Historic site

55 Lower Fort Street, Millers Point is a heritage-listed former house and now professional offices located at 55 Lower Fort Street, in the inner city Sydney suburb of Millers Point, in the City of Sydney local government area of New South Wales, Australia. The property was added to the New South Wales State Heritage Register on 2 April 1999.

== History ==
In April 2000 the property sold for A$2.35 million.

== Description ==
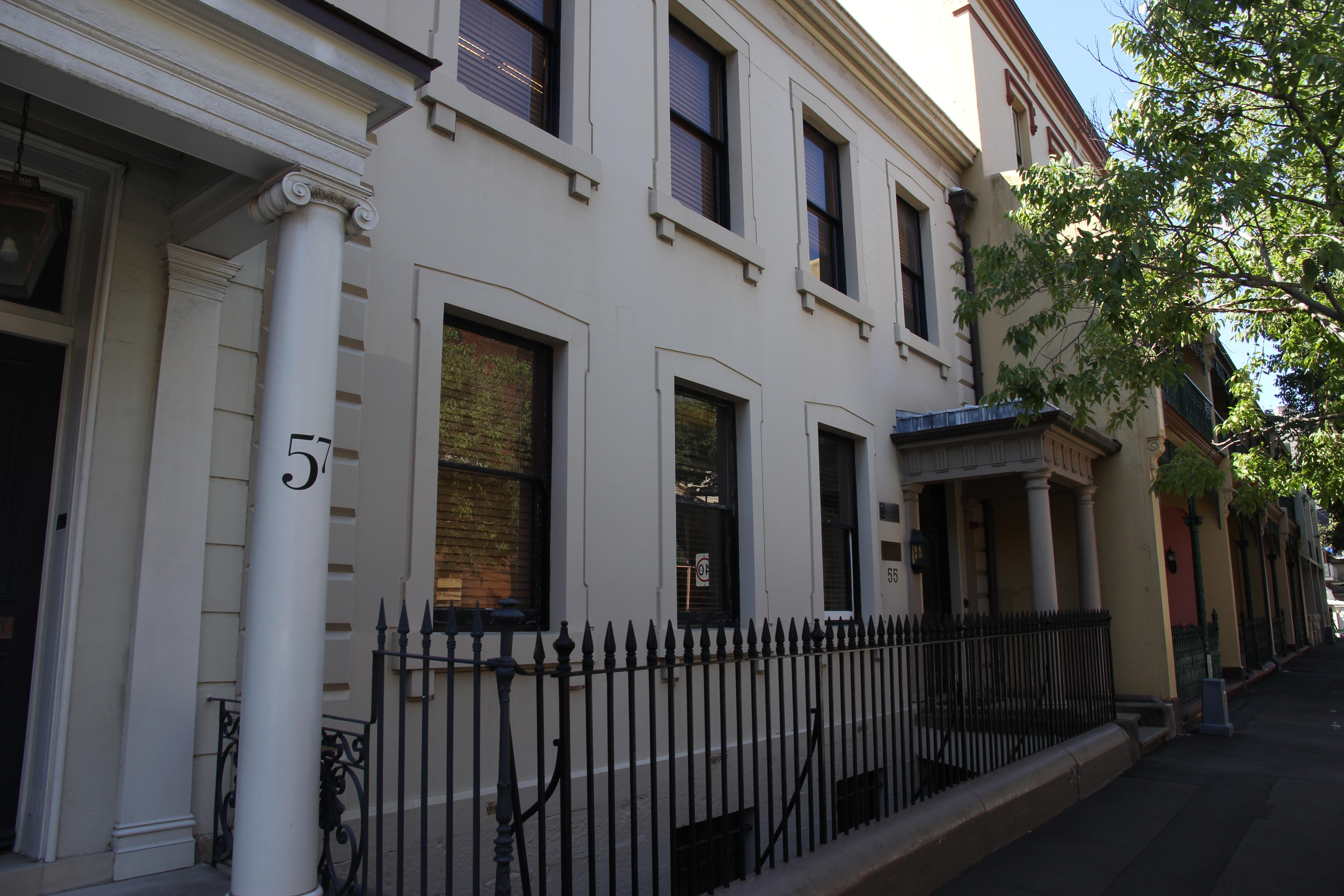
55 Lower Fort Street, pictured in 2019.

Completed in the Victorian Regency style, the building is currently occupied by Tropman and Tropman Architects.

== Heritage listing ==
Building was listed on the New South Wales State Heritage Register on 2 April 1999.

== See also ==
- 47-53 Lower Fort Street
- Regency Townhouses, 57-61 Lower Fort Street
