= 6–8 Argyle Place, Millers Point =

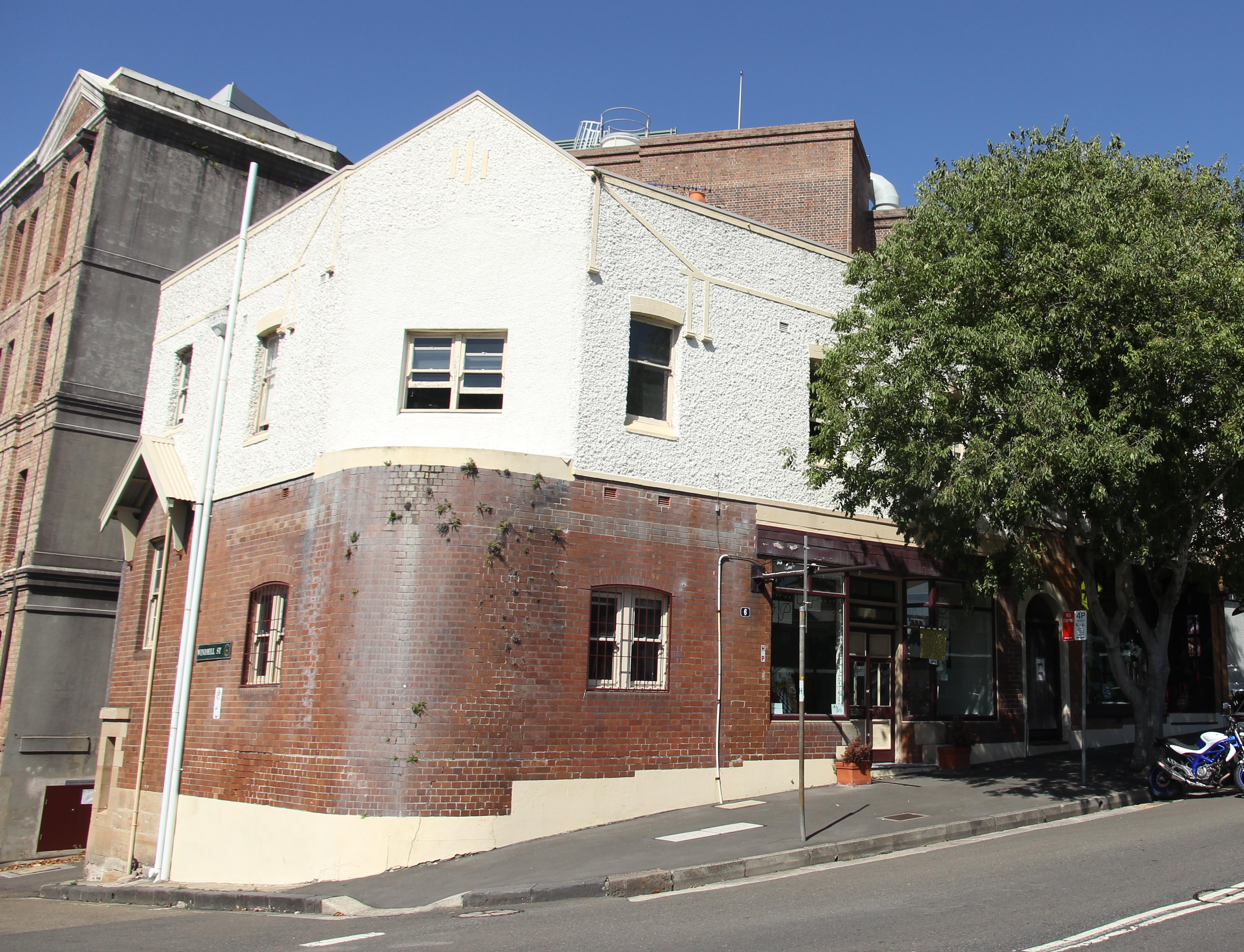
- 6–8 Argyle Place, pictured in 2019.

- Location within Sydney Location within Australia
- 33.8581°S 151.2030°E
- Location: 6, 8 Argyle Place, Millers Point, City of Sydney, New South Wales, Australia

History
- Built: c. 1906

Site notes
- Architectural styles: Federation; Edwardian

New South Wales Heritage Register
- Official name: Shops
- Type: State heritage (built)
- Designated: 2 April 1999
- Reference no.: 870
- Type: Shop
- Category: Retail and Wholesale

6–8 Argyle Place, Millers Point is a heritage-listed residential accommodation and commercial building located at 6–8 Argyle Place, in the inner city Sydney suburb of Millers Point in the City of Sydney local government area of New South Wales, Australia. The property was added to the New South Wales State Heritage Register on 2 April 1999.

== History ==
Millers Point is one of the earliest areas of European settlement in Australia, and a focus for maritime activities. Argyle Place, a primitive version of a London Square, was commenced by Governor Macquarie but not fully formed until after quarrying of the adjacent rock face had ceased in about 1865. A significant streetscape element, this Edwardian commercial/residential group mostly intact, forms an interesting corner at the end of Argyle Place. First tenanted by the NSW Department of Housing in 1986.

== Description ==
One of a row of terraces, commercial on ground floor with residential space over. Built c. 1906 in the Federation style, important streetscape element. Storeys: Two; Construction: Face brick and rendered masonry walls with slate roof. Painted timber joinery and trim. Style: Edwardian Orientation: Overlooking Argyle Place.

The external condition of the property is good.

=== Modifications and dates ===
External: Shop fronts altered, windows altered, verandahs infilled, brick work painted, services added. Last inspected: 19/02/95

== Heritage listing ==
As at 23 November 2000, this building is one of a group of five post-plague Edwardian commercial and residential properties, which are very important to the streetscape of Millers Point.

It is part of the Millers Point Conservation Area, an intact residential and maritime precinct. It contains residential buildings and civic spaces dating from the 1830s and is an important example of C19th adaptation of the landscape.

6–8 Argyle Place, Millers Point was listed on the New South Wales State Heritage Register on 2 April 1999.

== See also ==
- Australian residential architectural styles
- 10-12a Argyle Place, Millers Point
