= Eagleton Terrace =

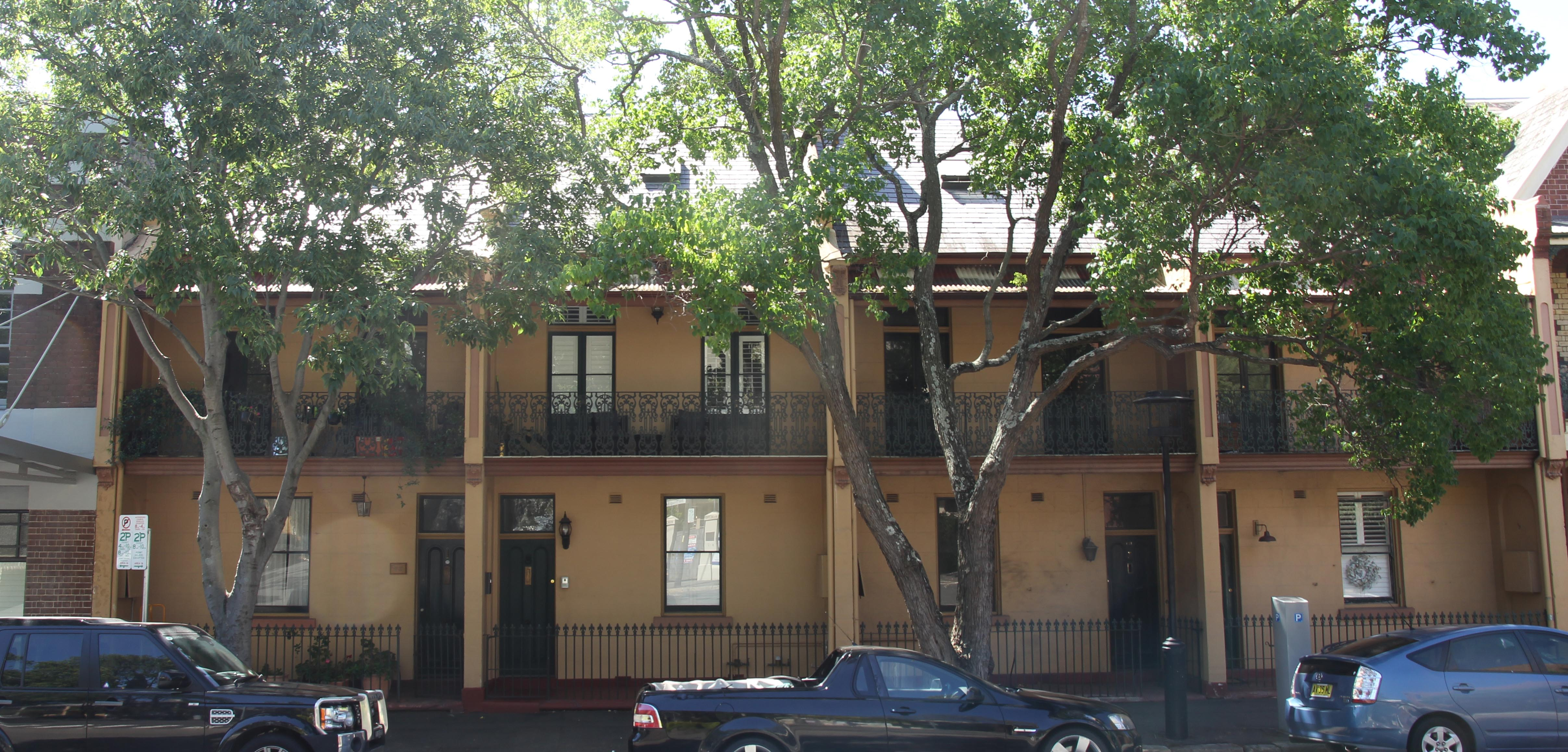
- Eagleton Terrace, pictured in 2019

- Location within Sydney Location within Australia
- 33.8573°S 151.2062°E
- Location: 67, 69, 71, 73 Lower Fort Street, Millers Point, City of Sydney, New South Wales, Australia

History
- Built: c. 1860s

Site notes
- Architectural style: Victorian Filigree

New South Wales Heritage Register
- Official name: Eagleton Terrace
- Type: State heritage (built)
- Designated: 2 April 1999
- Reference no.: 882 / 904
- Type: Terrace
- Category: Residential buildings (private)

The Eagleton Terrace are heritage-listed terrace houses located at 67–73 Lower Fort Street, in the inner city Sydney suburb of Millers Point in the City of Sydney local government area of New South Wales, Australia. The property was added to the New South Wales State Heritage Register on 2 April 1999.

== History ==
Millers Point is one of the earliest areas of European settlement in Australia, and a focus for maritime activities. This building was constructed during the mid 1860s as one of a group of four terrace houses. First tenanted by the NSW Department of Housing in 1984.

== Description ==
Two storey, five bedroom, early Victorian terrace with basement and attic. Cast iron lace balcony and infilled verandah. Skylight to attic. Storeys: Two; Construction: Painted rendered masonry, slate roof, cast iron lace, spear fence. Painted timber work. Style: Victorian Filigree.

The external condition of the property is good.

=== Modifications and dates ===
External: Timber work modified. Dormers have been removed. Some verandah infil.

== Heritage listing ==
As at 23 November 2000, this property is part of a group of early Victorian terraces.

It is part of the Millers Point Conservation Area, an intact residential and maritime precinct. It contains residential buildings and civic spaces dating from the 1830s and is an important example of 19th century adaptation of the landscape.

Eagleton Terrace was listed on the New South Wales State Heritage Register on 2 April 1999.

== See also ==
- Australian residential architectural styles
- Vermont Terrace, 63-65 Lower Fort Street
- 75-77 Lower Fort Street
