= 47–53 Lower Fort Street, Millers Point =

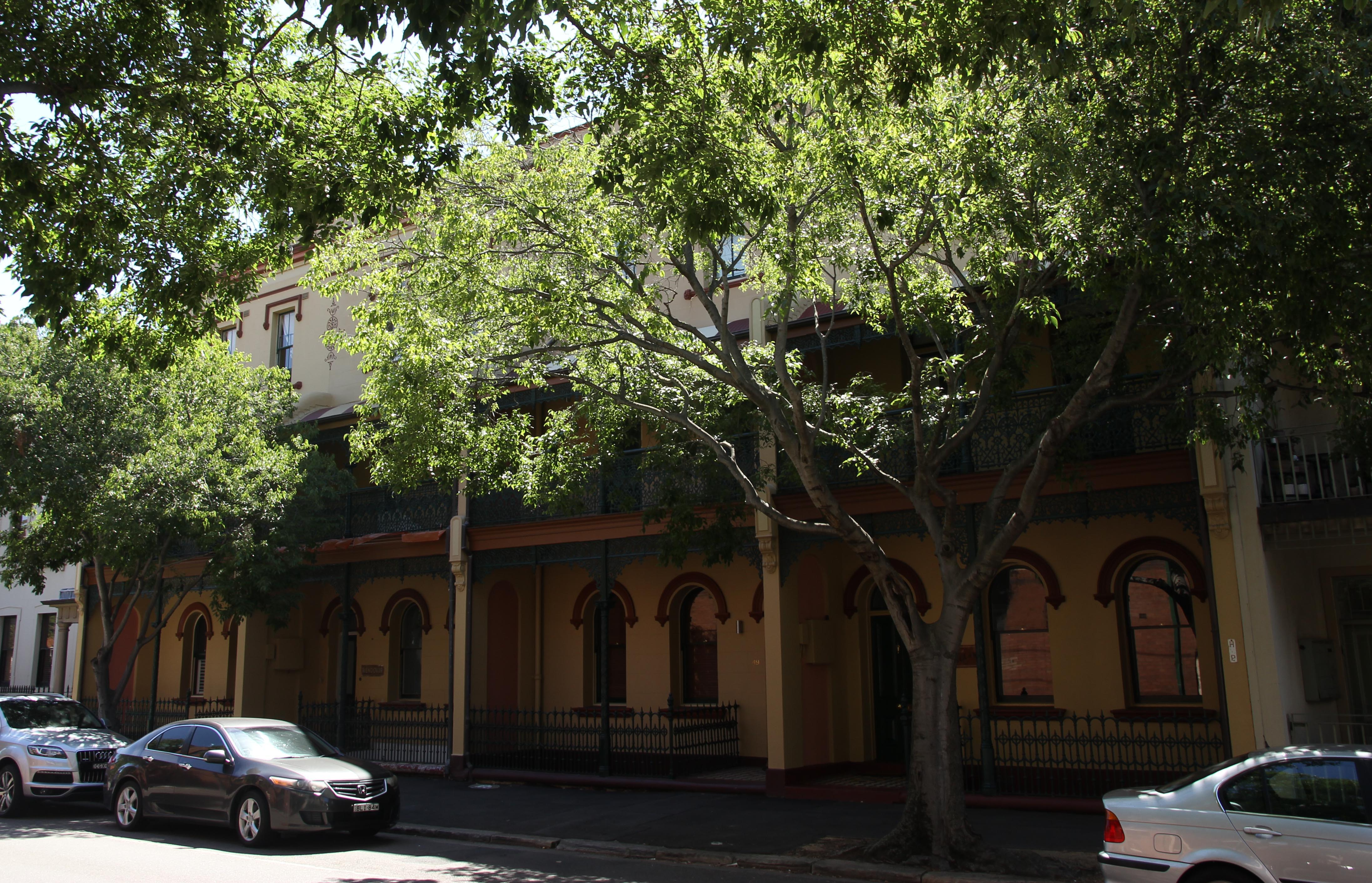
- 47–53 Lower Fort Street, pictured in 2019.

- Location within Sydney Location within Australia
- 33.8568°S 151.2067°E
- Location: 47, 49, 51, 53 Lower Fort Street, Millers Point, City of Sydney, New South Wales, Australia

Site notes
- Architectural style: Victorian Italianate

New South Wales Heritage Register
- Official name: Terrace
- Type: State heritage (built)
- Designated: 2 April 1999
- Reference no.: 906
- Type: Terrace
- Category: Residential buildings (private)

47–53 Lower Fort Street, Millers Point are heritage-listed terrace houses located at 47–53 Lower Fort Street, in the inner city Sydney suburb of Millers Point in the City of Sydney local government area of New South Wales, Australia. The property was added to the New South Wales State Heritage Register on 2 April 1999.

== History ==
Millers Point is one of the earliest areas of European settlement in Australia, and a focus for maritime activities. This building is one of a group of late nineteenth century terraces. First tenanted by NSW Department of Housing in 1992.

== Description ==
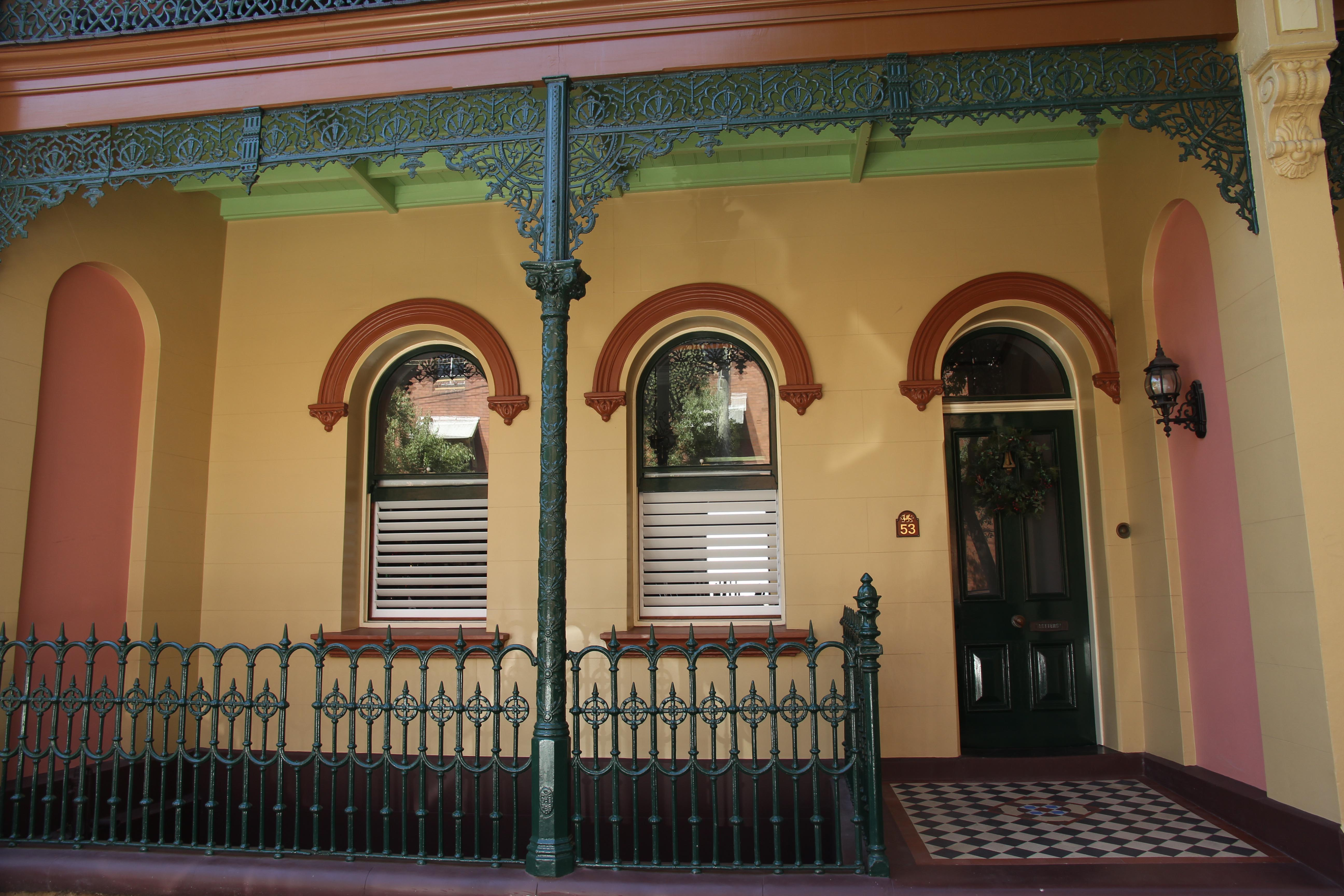
Entrance to 53 Lower Fort Street, pictured in 2019.

Three storeys, six bedroom Victorian Italianate terrace house with iron lace balustrading and friezes and brackets. The top floor has two double hung sash windows and incised motifs, middle floor has two french doors opening onto balcony, and the ground floor has two sash windows and front door with fanlight above. Steps to basement lead from front porch. Storeys: 3 Construction: Painted rendered masonry. Corrugated galvanised iron roofing. Timber with iron lace balcony, cast iron central column. Style: Victorian Italianate.

The external condition of the property is good.

=== Modifications and dates ===
External: Timber handrail added. Fenestration altered.

== Heritage listing ==
As at 23 November 2000, this is a group of three storey Victorian Italianate terraces, representing a quality streetscape element.

It is part of the Millers Point Conservation Area, an intact residential and maritime precinct. It contains residential buildings and civic spaces dating from the 1830s and is an important example of 19th century adaptation of the landscape.

47–53 Lower Fort Street, Millers Point, was listed on the New South Wales State Heritage Register on 2 April 1999.

== See also ==
- Australian residential architectural styles
- 55 Lower Fort Street
