= Walsh Bay Wharves Precinct =

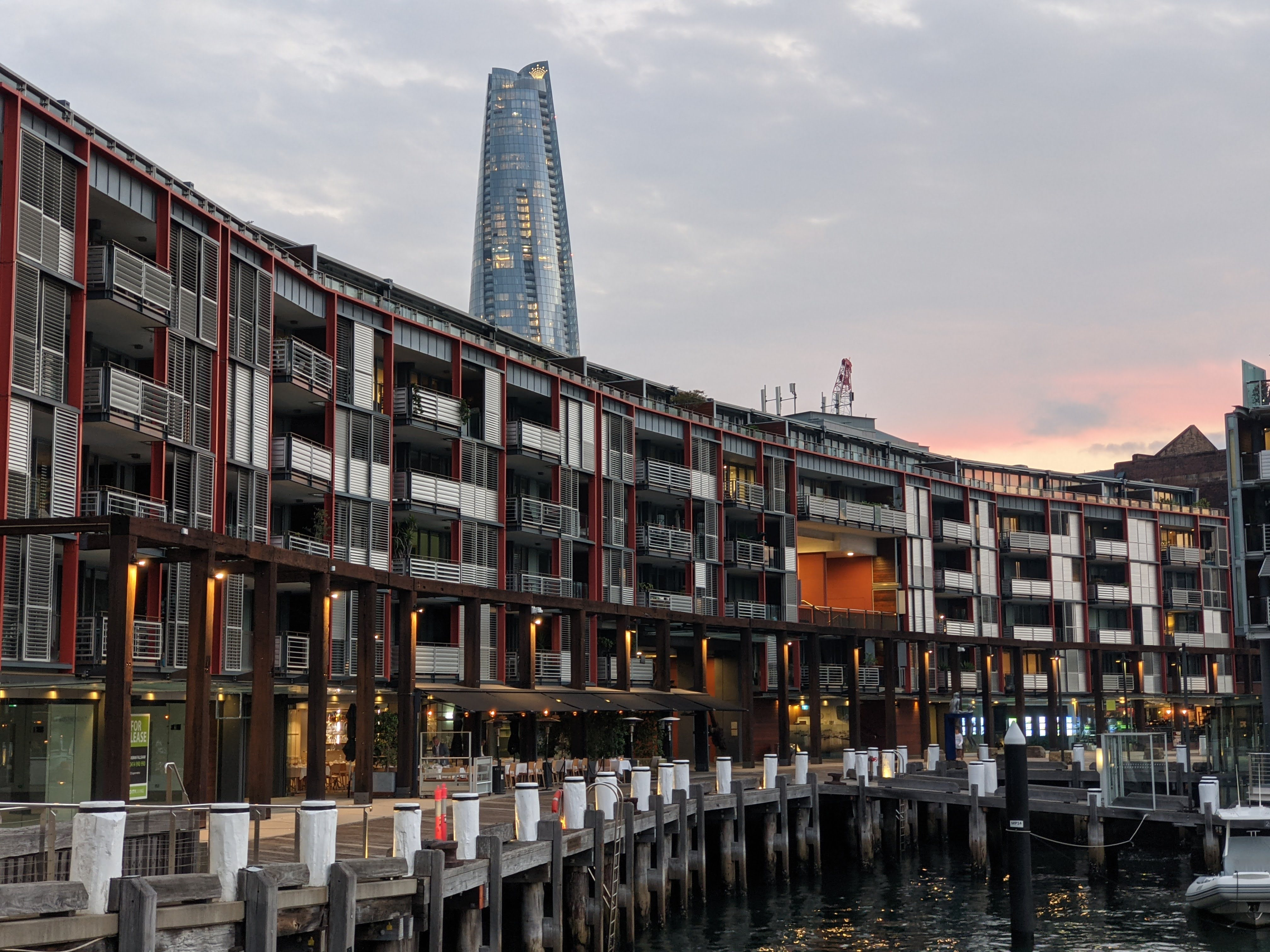
- Walsh Bay Wharves Precinct

- Location within Sydney Location within Australia
- 33.8569°S 151.2050°E
- Location: Hickson Road, Millers Point, City of Sydney, New South Wales, Australia

History
- Built: 1912–1921

Site notes
- Architect: H. D. Walsh

New South Wales Heritage Register
- Official name: Walsh Bay Wharves Precinct; Walsh Bay Wharves; Millers Point; MSB Bond Store No.3; Parbury Ruins
- Type: State heritage (complex / group)
- Designated: 2 April 1999
- Reference no.: 559
- Type: Wharf
- Category: Transport – Water
- Builders: Supervised by H. D. Walsh

The Walsh Bay Wharves Precinct, also known as the Walsh Bay Arts Precinct, is a heritage-listed former wharf precinct, now converted to hospitality and entertainment purposes, at Hickson Road, in the inner city Sydney suburb of Millers Point in the City of Sydney local government area of New South Wales, Australia. It was designed by H. D. Walsh, who also supervised its construction from 1912 to 1921. It includes the MSB Bond Store No. 3 and the Parbury Ruins. It was added to the New South Wales State Heritage Register on 2 April 1999.

Between 2018 and 2022, the precinct underwent a major redevelopment to transform several heritage-listed wharves into modern performance venues, now housing resident arts organisations including Sydney Theatre Company, Australian Theatre for Young People, Bell Shakespeare and the Australian Chamber Orchestra.

== Walsh Bay ==
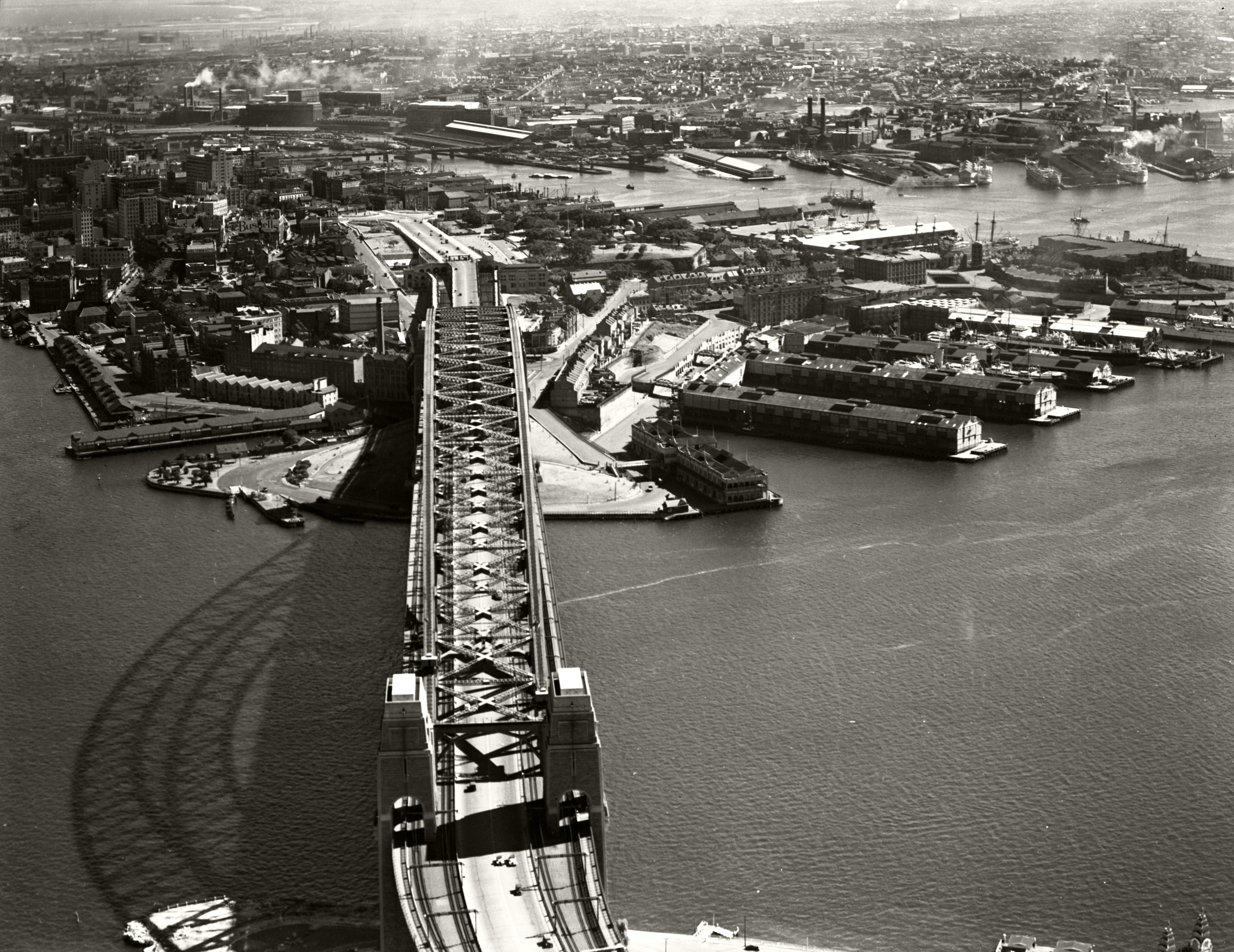
A 1937 image of the Sydney Harbour Bridge with Walsh Bay to the right of the Bridge in the centre of the image

Walsh Bay is a bay within Port Jackson, Sydney Harbour, about 1,000 metres (3,300 ft) south of the suburb McMahons Point, New South Wales, Australia. It is named after Henry Deane Walsh, Engineer-in-chief of the Sydney Harbour Trust in the early 20th century. Walsh Bay stretches from the Dawes Point (Aboriginal: Tar-ra) in the northeast, to the Millers Point (Aboriginal: Coodyee) in the southwest, and the original shoreline has been altered to include developments now known as Piers 1 to 9.

The bay was first named in 1918 on drawings of a major new "wharfage scheme" to modernise Sydney's docks to handle steamships and motor vehicles. The rejuvenation was planned by Henry Deane Walsh as engineer-in-chief of the Sydney Harbour Trust. Its then-chairman, Robert Rowan Purdon Hickson, lent his name to Hickson Road, the new freight thoroughfare around this headland.

== History ==
The rocky terrain of Millers Point limited its early uses to fortifications (Dawes Point and Observatory Hill), anchorage for whalers (Walsh Bay) and windmills (the original Millers Point). Economic growth and population pressures resulted in more intensive settlement by the 1820s and land ownership was confirmed by a number of Crown grants in the 1830s.

By the 1830s the present basic road system (Kent Street, Argyle Street, Windmill Street and Lower Fort Street) had appeared together with the earliest buildings still existing, such as the 1835 St Brigid's Roman Catholic Church. In the 1830s and 1840s, substantial merchant's residences appeared, together with early hotels such as the Lord Nelson Hotel (1834) and Hero of Waterloo Hotel (1844) and community buildings such as the Garrison Church (1840). The north shore ferry began operating from Walsh Bay to Blues Point in the 1840s, the location of its wharf still indicated by Ferry Lane. Other shipping wharves had appeared at Millers Point by the same decade, scattered irregularly along the shoreline from Dawes Point to Darling Harbour. Warehouses and hydraulic equipment were developed to service these wharves from the 1830s. Substantial construction of private terrace housing also occurred between the 1840s and the 1890s and led to the area being substantially built-up by 1900.

The residential character of the area changed during the late nineteenth century and the wealthier, who were concentrated along Argyle and Lower Fort Streets, gradually moved to more desirable suburbs with the growth of the city. Their place was taken, and the rows of terraces filled with the working population which serviced the waterfront. By the end of the century the area was considered to have substandard housing.

In 1900 the bubonic plague broke out in The Rocks and other parts of Sydney, causing widespread alarm and the resumption of most of The Rocks and Millers Point by the Government of New South Wales. Control of the area passed to the port authority, the Sydney Harbour Trust (later the Maritime Services Board, 1936). The Trust's primary commercial aim was to redevelop the wharfage along modern lines. However, because of the quantity of housing under its control it became landlord for Millers Point and between 1900 and the 1920s effectively transformed the area into a type of "company town". As well as the reconstruction of Walsh Bay, the Trust, together with the Government Housing Board, constructed workers' housing, shops, kindergartens, hotels and warehouses and also refurbished and reconstructed many existing buildings. In this way the population which serviced the port was accommodated nearby with all its community facilities. By 1930 Millers Point had been reshaped into its present form by the Trust and the area and the nature of its population changed little until the 2010s, apart from a declining component of port workers in the population.

The Trust's greatest engineering work in Millers Point was the reconstruction of Walsh Bay. In doing this they made the second major modification to the landscape since the cutting of quarries above Kent Street and the making of the Argyle Cut in the early 19th century. The Engineer-in-Chief of the Trust, H. D. Walsh (after whom the bay was subsequently named), designed and constructed a new system of wharves, stores and associated roads and hydraulic systems to service them. A wide service road, Hickson Road, was excavated around the foreshore and the steep topography was used ingeniously to service the wharves at two levels. The wharves were technologically advanced for the time. They were constructed on a standard modular timber design and incorporated an innovative and successful ratproof seawall.

Construction of the whole complex took place between 1906 and 1922. Wharf 1 was completed in 1913. Wharf 2/3 and sheds were completed in 1920-1921. Wharf 4 /5 and sheds completed in 1920-1921. Wharf 6 /7 and sheds completed in 1918. Wharf 8 /9 and sheds completed in 1912. The Administrative Block was completed c. 1912. Wharf 10A /10B was completed in 1906-1908 and sheds altered in 1918–1921 but later demolished in 1976.

Superseded by changing shipping technology in the 1970s, the Walsh Bay complex is believed to be the only one of its type surviving in the world.

The wharves were converted to apartments, theatres, restaurants, cafes and a hotel, and in 2015 the area was designated as an arts precinct. Much of the precinct is listed on the New South Wales State Heritage Register.

In 2026, the NSW Government announced that ferry services would return to Walsh Bay using the existing wharf structure from early 2027.

=== Recent redevelopment (2018–2022) ===
Beginning in 2018, the New South Wales Government, through Infrastructure NSW, undertook a major AUD 207–262 million transformation of the precinct, led by Tonkin Zulaikha Greer Architects and delivered by Richard Crookes Constructions. The project fully renovated Wharf 4 and 5 (completed in December 2020) and Piers 2 and3 (completed early 2022), converting both from industrial wool sheds into modern arts venues while preserving their heritage fabric. Structural reinforcement, fire engineering upgrades, raised roof sections and retractable seating were incorporated to create flexible, acoustically excellent performance spaces for nine resident companies. Interiors feature conserved original hardwood timbers contrasted with new brushbox and ironbark finishes, and innovative details such as braille‑routed Queensland maple veneer walls and solar-powered seawater cooling systems for sustainability. The precinct has since garnered numerous awards, including the 2022 NSW Architecture Medallion, the National Trust Heritage Award for Adaptive Reuse, and Australian Timber Design Awards, especially for its interior commercial timber design. Since reopening it has become a vibrant arts hub with purpose-built theatres, event and rehearsal spaces for prominent companies such as Bangarra Dance Theatre, Australian Chamber Orchestra, Sydney Theatre Company, Australian Theatre for Young People and others.

== Culture ==
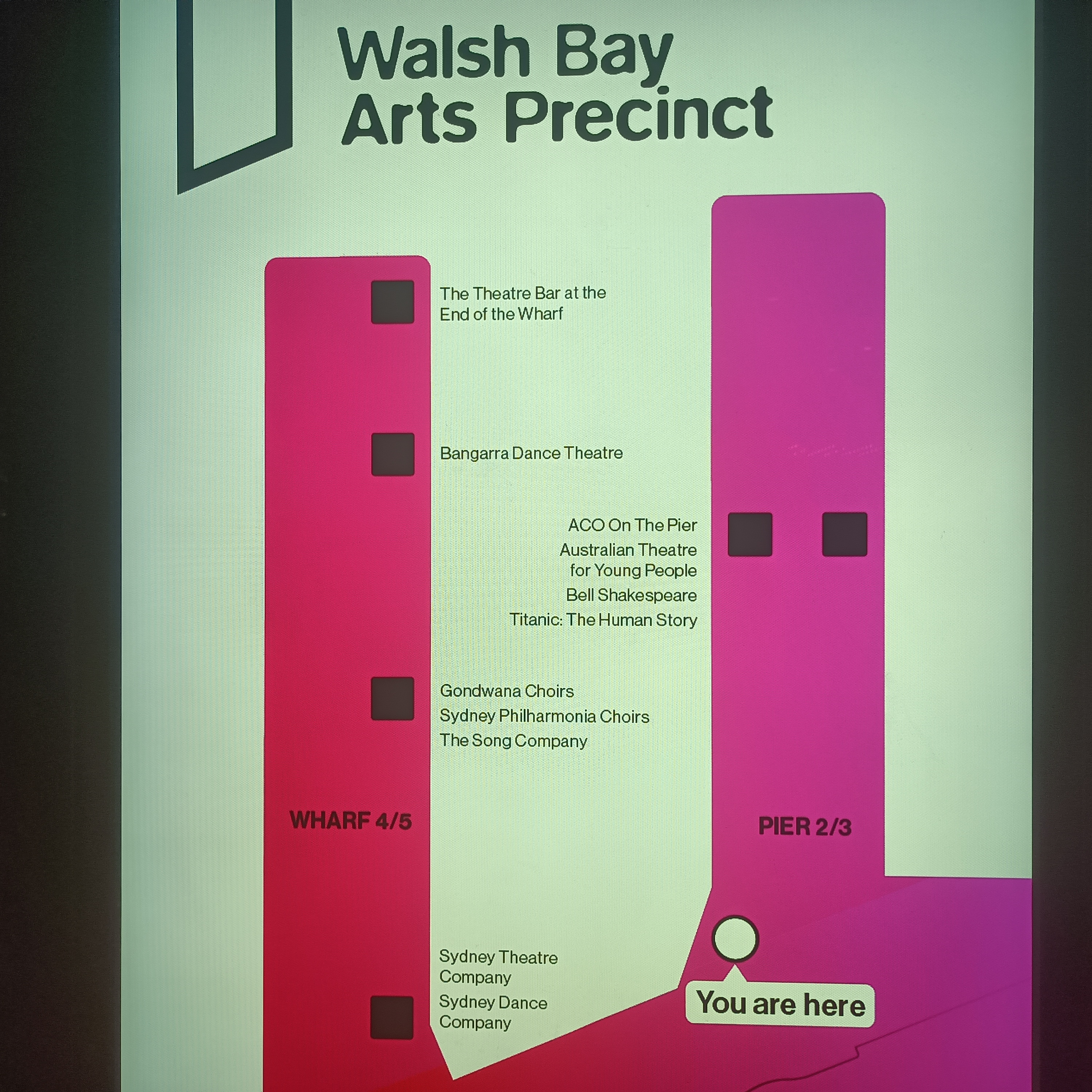
Walsh Bay Arts Precinct, Dawes Point Sydney. 2025

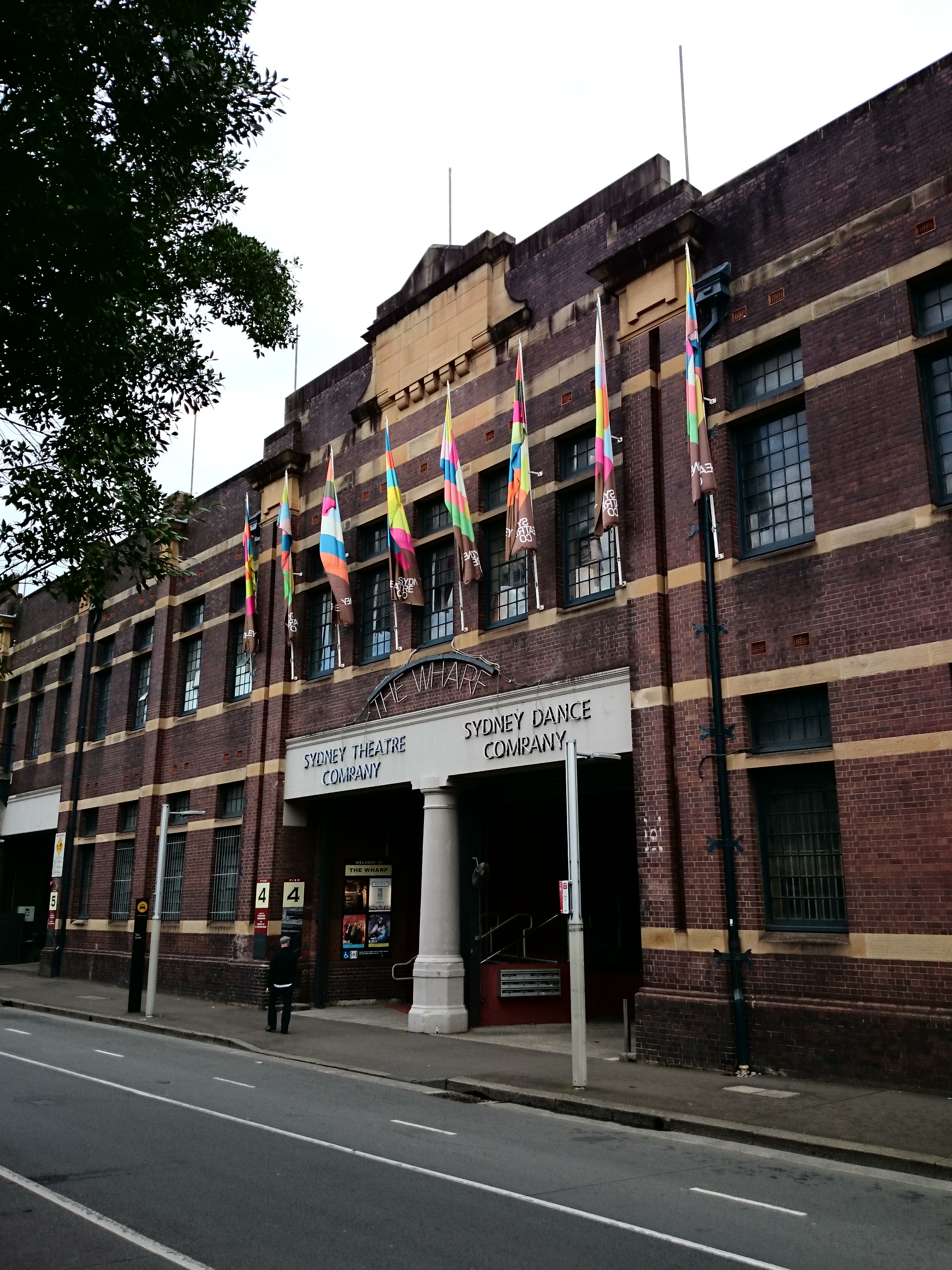
The entrance to Pier 4/5 which is a renovated cargo wharf house. The Wharf Theatres, which are part of the Sydney Theatre Company, are located in Pier 4/5. 2014

The Wharf Theatres, which are part of the Sydney Theatre Company, are located in Pier 4/5, which is an early 20th-century renovated cargo wharf house that was completed between 1920 and 1921. It is located in the Walsh Bay Wharves Precinct at Dawes Point. There are two theatres that make up the wharf theatres: Wharf theatre 1, which has 339 seats, and Wharf theatre 2, which has 205 seats. There are also five dance studios located in Pier 4/5 that are run by the Sydney Dance Company. These dance studios are used by the Sydney Dance Company to create, rehearse, teach and perform dance in.

The Sydney Theatre Company also operates and makes regular use of the Roslyn Packer Theatre which is located nearby in Millers Point just opposite Pier 6/7. It is a former cargo storage site from the 1830s and it is also used by the Sydney Dance Company and the Sydney Writers Festival.

== Description ==
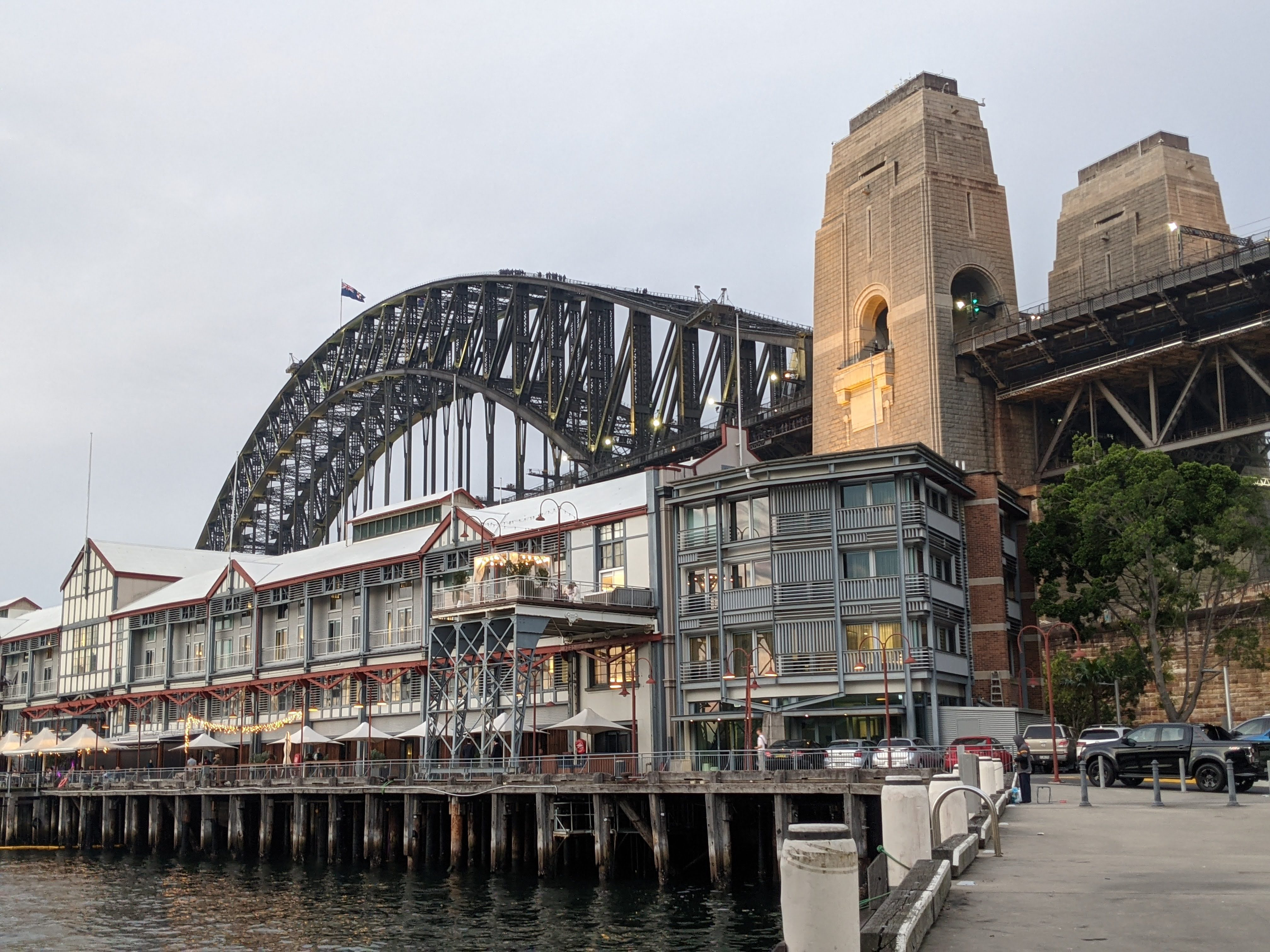
Looking east towards the Harbour Bridge

The Walsh Bay Wharves Precinct is an integrated port precinct comprising wharves, shore sheds, bond stores, bridges and roads. A standard modular timber design was developed for the wharves, wharf sheds and shore sheds so that they could easily be adapted to the requirements of individual sites. Some structures predate the Sydney Harbour Trust work (such as the remains of Towns Bond, Bond Stores Nos. 1 & 3).

The wharves are constructed of turpentine piles spaced on a 3-metre (10 ft) grid, come spliced together to reach down to rock 44 metres (145 ft) below sea level. Rows of piles are capped with a 36 by 36 centimetres (14 by 14 in) iron-bark headstock and tied together by 30 by 30 centimetres (12 by 12 in) iron-bark girders at 102 centimetres (3 ft 4 in) centres. The whole was covered with 23 by 10 centimetres (9 by 4 in) brush-box decking. Later this was covered with a 4in thick concrete deck.

The wharf sheds (typically two storey) are of simple post and beam construction with 36 by 36 centimetres (14 by 14 in) hardwood storey posts at 610-centimetre (20 ft) centres supporting 30 by 23 centimetres (12 by 9 in) joists and 30 by 30 centimetres (12 by 12 in) bearers covered with 23 by 10 centimetres (9 by 4 in) hardwood decking and 13 by 5 centimetres (5 by 2 in) diagonal sheathing. The joists are supplemented with adjustable steel trussing. Oregon roof trusses forming a double gable are supported on 28 by 28 centimetres (11 by 11 in) hardwood storey posts at 610-centimetre (20 ft) centres. Ventilation and clerestory lighting are features of the wharf shed roof. Wall cladding consists of 20 ft wide infill panels of hardwood weatherboards, sliding doors, glazed sashes or galvanised iron. Roofs are galvanised iron or asbestos cement. Travelling platforms run the full length of the wharf shed.

Shore sheds are of similar construction but typically irregularly shaped. They sit on solid fill retained by the precast concrete sea wall. The shed facades to Hickson Road are of brick.

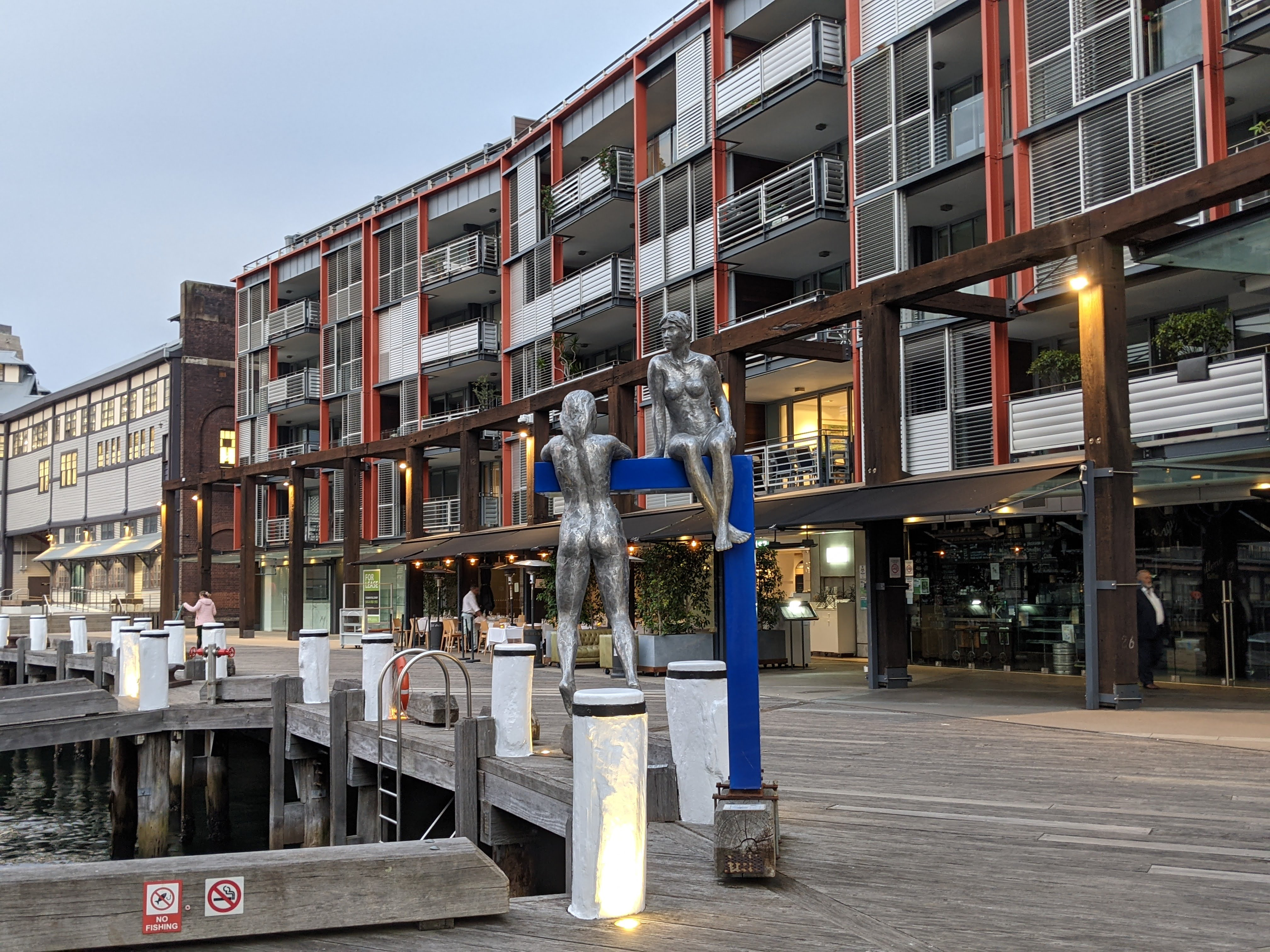
Sculptures and dining along the waterfront

Overpass Bridges above Hickson Road give access to the upper levels of each shore shed. Hickson Road which was quarried from the sandstone cliffs gives sea level access. Wharf 1 is a long shore wharf with cement rendered wharf shed facade to Hickson Road. Outstanding feature is deep timber balcony to Harbour side end. Wharves 2/3 and 4/ 5 are finger wharves with two storey wharf and shore sheds, brick facades to Hickson Road. Wharf 6/7 is a finger wharf with one storey wharf shed and two storey shore shed, brick facade to Hickson Road. Wharf 8/9 is a finger wharf with two storey wharf and shore shed and adjoining administration block, overhanging top storey. An improved rat proof sea wall designed by Walsh. It was L-shaped and constructed of precast reinforced concrete trestles and erected at Walsh Bay between 1907 and 1910.

The hydraulic power system of wharves 8 and 9 is one of the most important power systems developed in the nineteenth century. The system includes the accumulator, pump and electric motor, the high pressure pipes and 3 ton hydraulic lift and two hydraulic hoists and was an essential part of the operations of the wool handling wharves, supplying power to lift hoists and the original wool dumps (bale presses). Other original features include bale elevators, bale elevator platforms, remnants of the bale stacking systems, trucking gangway and openings for the nine hinged wool chutes. Other industrial and engineering artefacts include ladderways, bale hoists, overhead pulley systems, floor hatches, wooden rollers, a hydraulic ram and cat hoists, overhead travelling cranes, a lifting beam, electric lifts, wool bale drops, wool slides, hoist wells, mooring piles and heavy timber bracings.

== Heritage listing ==
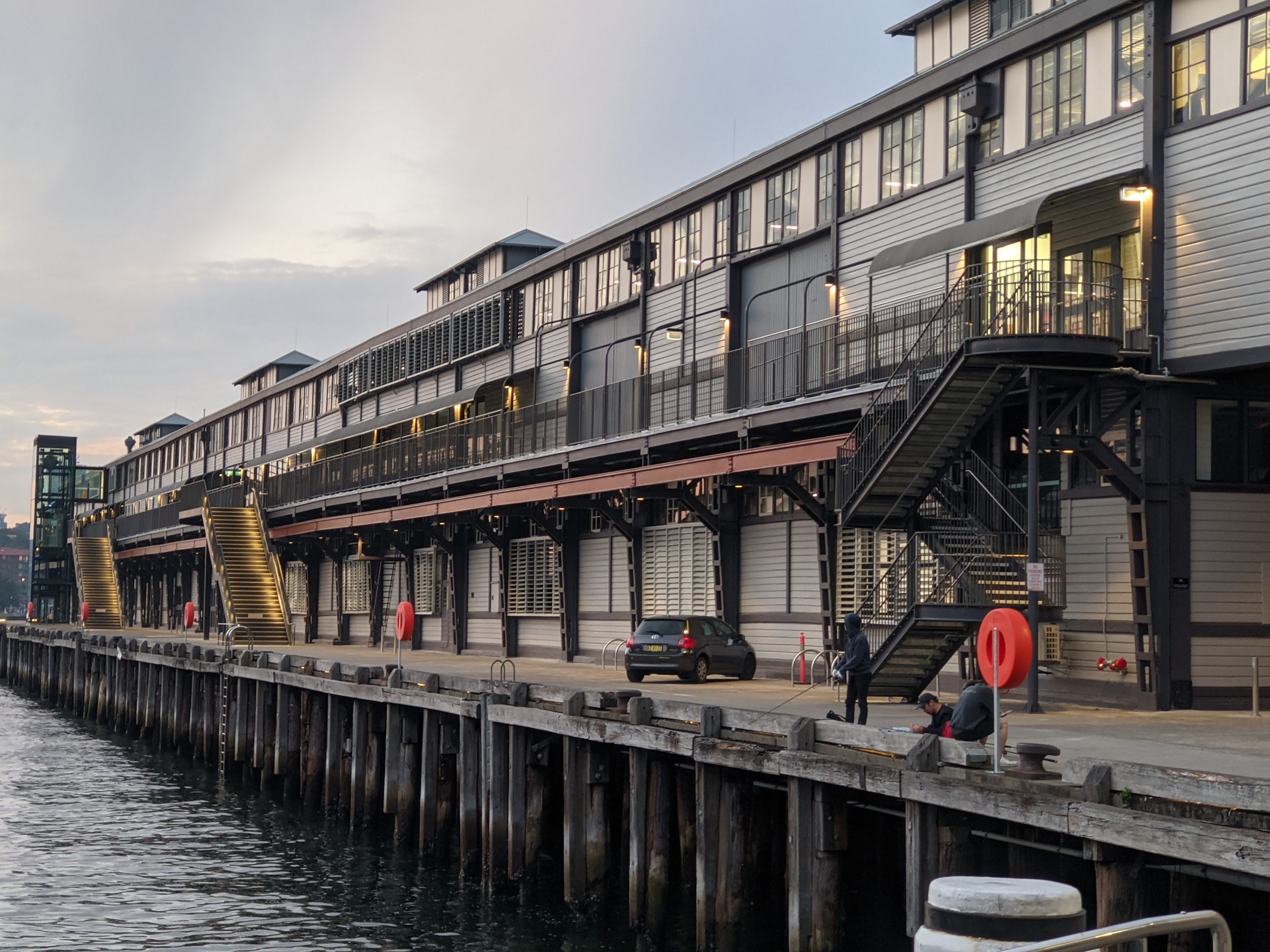
Heritage listed wharves in Walsh Bay

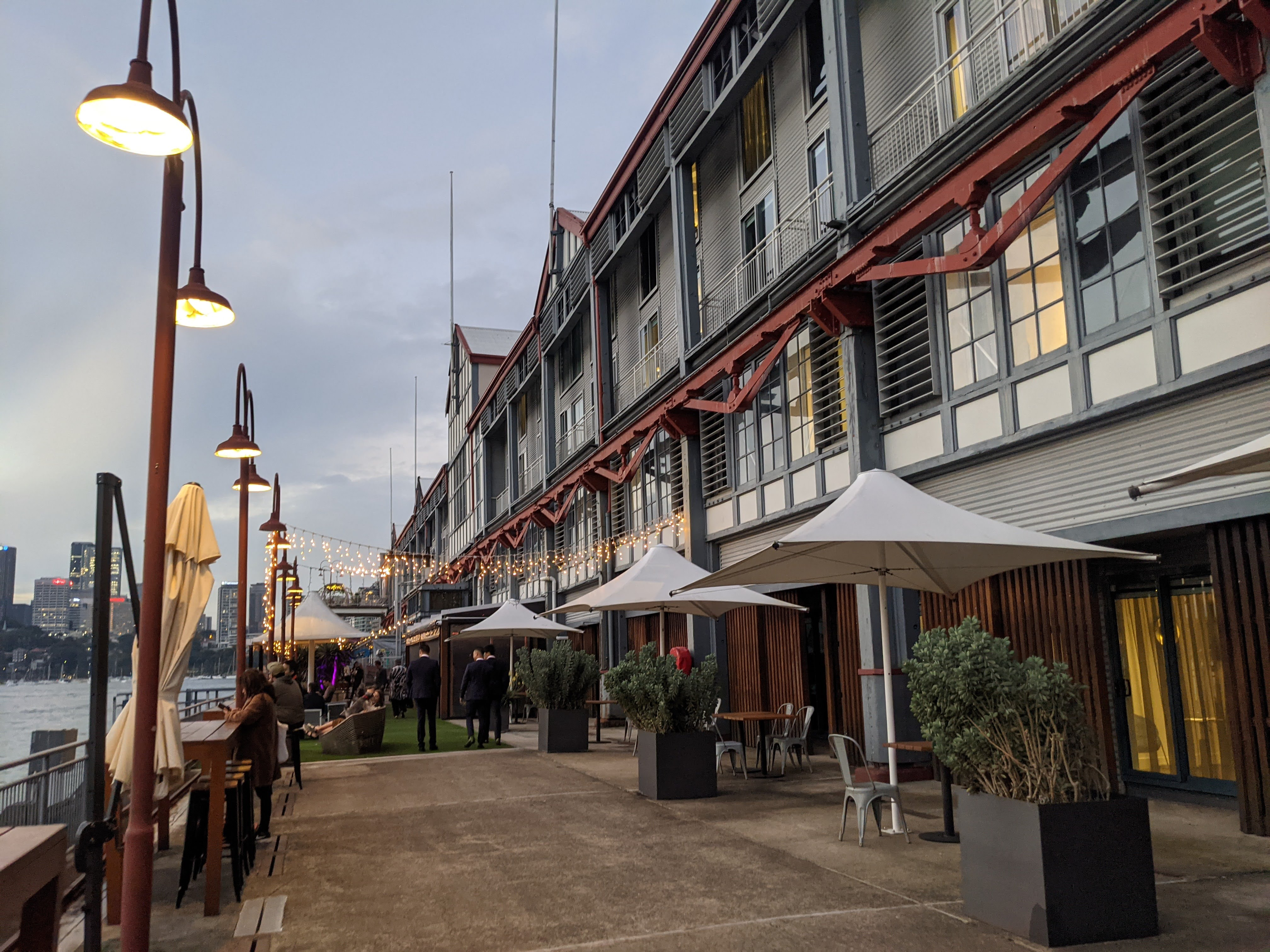
Looking north along one of the wharves

The Walsh Bay area is of State cultural significance due to its combination of steep rocky terrain, early, mid, late-Victorian and Edwardian housing, surviving Victorian bond stores, and the results of an early twentieth century urban redevelopment scheme of unique scale: the timber wharf and shore structures and associated rock cuttings, roads and bridges. The Walsh Bay Wharves and associated buildings and works are a largely intact port and stevedoring facility created by the Sydney Harbour Trust in response to the requirements of maritime trade at the time (1900s–1910s). The precinct documents the workings of a technologically advanced early twentieth century shipping port, developed specifically to accommodate new mechanised transportation technology. The wharves have a distinctive character created by the use of heavy timber construction and the regular grid layout of piles, columns, beams and infill cladding. The precinct is unified in materials, form and scale and contains structures demonstrating maritime uses. It demonstrates the life of inner Sydney in the early twentieth century. The precinct demonstrates technical and creative excellence of the period 1820–1930.

Walsh Bay Wharves Precinct was listed on the New South Wales State Heritage Register on 2 April 1999 having satisfied the following criteria.

The place is important in demonstrating the course, or pattern, of cultural or natural history in New South Wales.

The Walsh Bay Wharves and their associated infrastructure are a virtually intact port and stevedore works created by the Sydney Harbour Trust in response to the requirements of maritime trade at that time. The precinct documents the workings of a technologically advanced early twentieth century shipping port, developed specifically to accommodate new mechanised transportation technology.

The place is important in demonstrating aesthetic characteristics and/or a high degree of creative or technical achievement in New South Wales.

The wharves have a strong distinctive character created by the logical use of heavy timber construction and the regular grid layout of piles, columns, beams and infill cladding. The precinct is unified in materials, form and scale and contains structures demonstrating maritime uses.

The place has a strong or special association with a particular community or cultural group in New South Wales for social, cultural or spiritual reasons.

The precinct demonstrates the life of inner Sydney in the early twentieth century.

The place has potential to yield information that will contribute to an understanding of the cultural or natural history of New South Wales.

The Walsh Bay Wharves and associated infrastructure demonstrate technical and creative excellence of the period 1820–1930.

The place possesses uncommon, rare or endangered aspects of the cultural or natural history of New South Wales.

Last intact complex of its type in the world.

The place is important in demonstrating the principal characteristics of a class of cultural or natural places/environments in New South Wales.

Best example of characteristic early 20th century port infrastructure in Sydney.

== See also ==
- Australian non-residential architectural styles
- The Hungry Mile
- Barangaroo
