= Regency Townhouses =

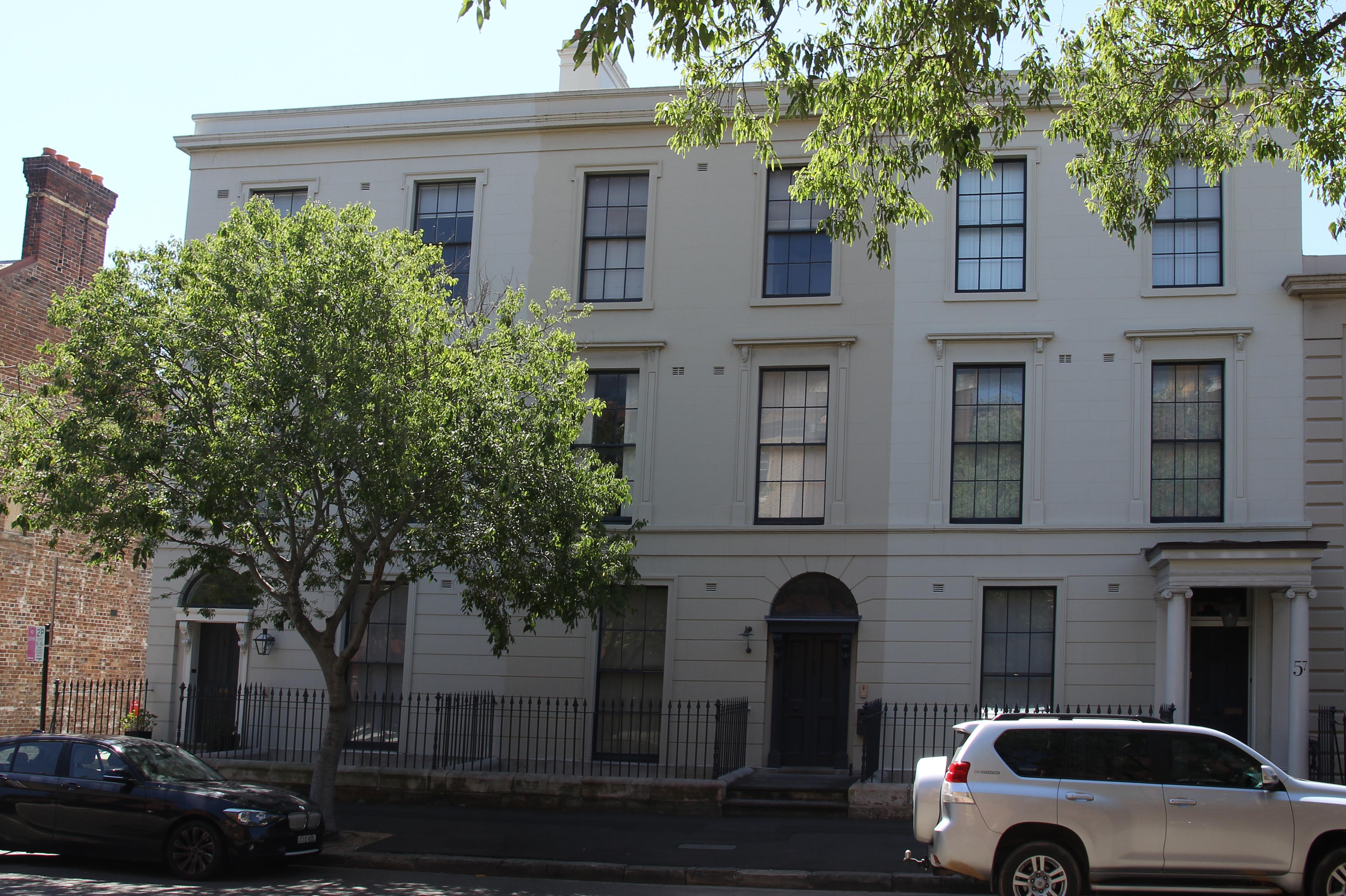
- Regency Townhouses at 57–61 Lower Fort Street, pictured in 2019.

- Location within Sydney Location within Australia
- 33.8570°S 151.2065°E
- Location: 57, 59, 61 Lower Fort Street, Millers Point, City of Sydney, New South Wales, Australia

Site notes
- Architectural style: Victorian Regency

New South Wales Heritage Register
- Official name: Regency Townhouses
- Type: State heritage (built)
- Designated: 2 April 1999
- Reference no.: 887
- Type: Town House
- Category: Residential buildings (private)

The Regency Townhouses are heritage-listed former terrace houses and now commercial offices located at 57–61 Lower Fort Street, in the inner city Sydney suburb of Millers Point in the City of Sydney local government area of New South Wales, Australia. The property was added to the New South Wales State Heritage Register on 2 April 1999.

== History ==
Millers Point is one of the earliest areas of European settlement in Australia, and a focus for maritime activities. This building is one of a group of fine Victorian Regency terraces based on the London model. First tenanted by Department of Housing in 1985.

== Description ==
Three storey Regency townhouse with basement based on the London model, set back from street and enclosed by cast-iron fence. Classic ionic entrance portico. Boarding house with three by one bedroom units and two by two bedroom units. Storeys: Three; Construction: Painted rendered masonry, corrugated galvanised iron roof. Spear fence. Style: Victorian Regency.

The external condition of the property is good.

=== Modifications and dates ===
External: Windows and fanlight altered.

== Heritage listing ==
As at 23 November 2000, this building is a group of three Regency style townhouses based on London model of three storeys with basements, which are in almost intact exterior condition.

It is part of the Millers Point Conservation Area, an intact residential and maritime precinct. It contains residential buildings and civic spaces dating from the 1830s and is an important example of 19th century adaptation of the landscape.

Regency Townhouses was listed on the New South Wales State Heritage Register on 2 April 1999.

== See also ==
- Australian residential architectural styles
