= Hero of Waterloo Hotel =

Historic pub in Sydney, New South Wales

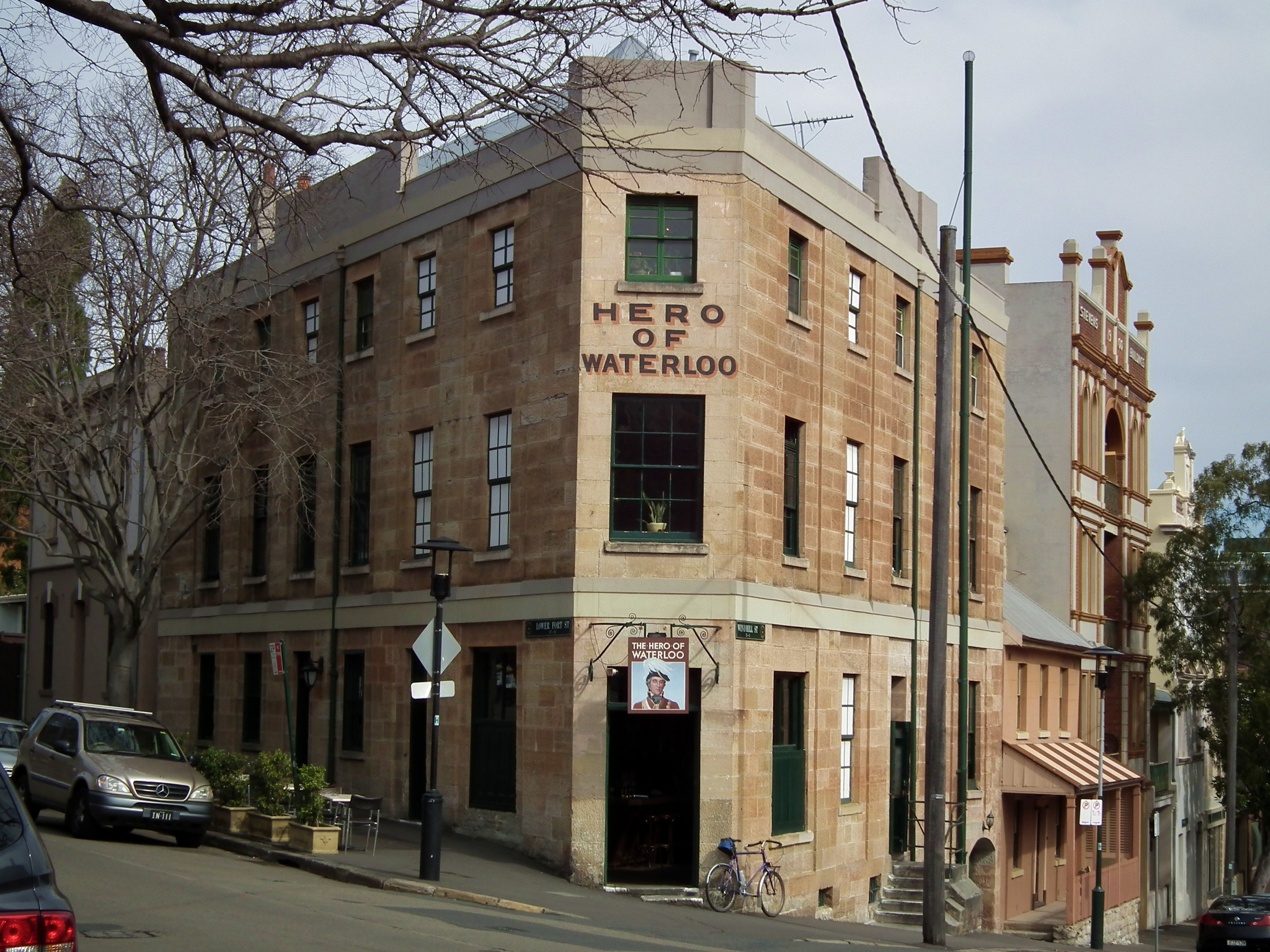
- The hotel in 2012

- Location within Sydney Location within Australia
- 33.8578°S 151.2058°E
- Location: 81–83 Lower Fort Street, Millers Point, City of Sydney, New South Wales, Australia

History
- Built: 1843–1844

Site notes
- Owner: OzColour Pty ltd

New South Wales Heritage Register
- Official name: Hero of Waterloo Hotel
- Type: State heritage (built)
- Designated: 2 April 1999
- Reference no.: 633
- Type: Hotel
- Category: Commercial

Hero of Waterloo Hotel is a heritage-listed pub located at 81–83 Lower Fort Street, in the inner city Sydney suburb of Millers Point, New South Wales, Australia. It was built from 1843 to 1844. The property is privately owned. It was added to the New South Wales State Heritage Register on 2 April 1999.

== History ==
The site of the Hero of Waterloo Hotel on the south side of Windmill Street was located in the government reserve. In 1831 the Town Surveyor, Ambrose Hallen reported that John Clarke had fenced in the site and his ownership was challenged. Clarke produced a legal transfer from the son of John Leighton (Jack the Miller, after who Millers Point was named). David Leighton had purchased it from Patrick Marmount who was said to have received it as compensation from Governor Lachlan Macquarie for land resumed for the new Military Hospital. It was 1841 before the grant was formalised for John Clarke. The site was first occupied by George Paton when he built the first part of a stone hotel consisting of a kitchen and bedroom which is now in part of the cellar.

The Hero of Waterloo is the second oldest surviving hotel in Sydney; the oldest is the nearby Lord Nelson Hotel. Paton was a stonemason who had worked on the nearby Garrison Church. Paton constructed the existing hotel c. 1842 on the corner of Lower Fort and Windmill Streets from sandstone excavated from the Argyle Cut. The hotel was first licensed in 1845. Rumours persist that the labyrinthine stone cellars of the Hero of Waterloo contain a concealed entrance from which a "smuggler's tunnel" had been dug to Darling Harbour.

The Hero of Waterloo was acquired by the Sydney Harbour Trust in the resumptions following an outbreak of bubonic plague in 1901. The trust demolished many hotels of dubious quality and many licenses were revoked following the Liquor Act 1912 but the Hero of Waterloo was one of a few early hotels to survive. The present main bar was two rooms until the removal of the dividing partition in 1928 to create one large room. In November 1988 the Department of Housing advertised the sale of the hotel and it passed into private ownership. The Sands Directory records occupants as 1860: J. Henderson; 1868: Mrs. A. Lincoln; 1873: Robert Russell; 1879–80: John Silk; 1883-91: William Oliff; 1892-95: H. Samuel; 1896-1900: William Healey.

== Description ==
The Hero of Waterloo, located on a prominent corner site in the centre of Millers Point, is a three-storey building designed in the Old Colonial Regency style and constructed in ashlar stone. The building features a splay corner with a double entrance door of 2 by three panels under a hanging sign. Above this is a large 12 pane Georgian window on 1st floor and a distinctive 8 pane window on the 2nd floor that appears to be original (the 1842 drawings shows it as 4 pane).

The North elevation has a large shopfront with Georgian beaded timber panelling to the bottom half, a door with stone and concrete steps, a cellar carriage way door, and the rest of the ground and first floor is made up of 12 pane Georgian windows separated by stone pilasters of extremely subtle relief all under a simple parapet with a central feature that is little more than a raised section of wall.

Earlier photos show corbelling and stone relief to the parapets which has since been removed c. 1980s. The 2nd floor again features the odd 8 pane windows. Similarly the lower fort street elevation is made up of 12 and 8 pane windows, a ground floor shopfront and entry door. A painted corbel runs across at first floor height. The design is subdued, free of ornament and very subtle.

The hipped and gable roof is clad in corrugated steel behind simple parapets. The interior features exposed stonework on ground and first floor, an early stone detailed fireplace and original timber joinery. The cellars contain the earliest structure on the site as well as a series of tunnels and cells which are said to have historic value from their nineteenth century use.

=== Modifications and dates ===
- Post 1988: some maintenance, repairs and minor renovations.

== Heritage listing ==
Hero of Waterloo Hotel was listed on the New South Wales State Heritage Register on 2 April 1999 having satisfied the following criteria.

The place is important in demonstrating the course, or pattern, of cultural or natural history in New South Wales.

The Hero of Waterloo is one of the earliest remaining hotels in Sydney, being of simple yet strong vernacular design and an excellent example of an 1840s city pub. It has been in continuous trade since 1845 and is one of the oldest surviving trading hotels in Australia.

The place has a strong or special association with a particular community or cultural group in New South Wales for social, cultural or spiritual reasons.

The hotel retains substantial evidence of its original form and is an integral component of the Millers Point precinct, an area demonstrating the changes of over a century of Sydney life and which has remained virtually unchanged since the 1920s.

== See also ==
- List of pubs in Sydney
