= Lord Nelson Hotel, Millers Point =

Historic pub in Sydney, New South Wales

Lord Nelson Hotel
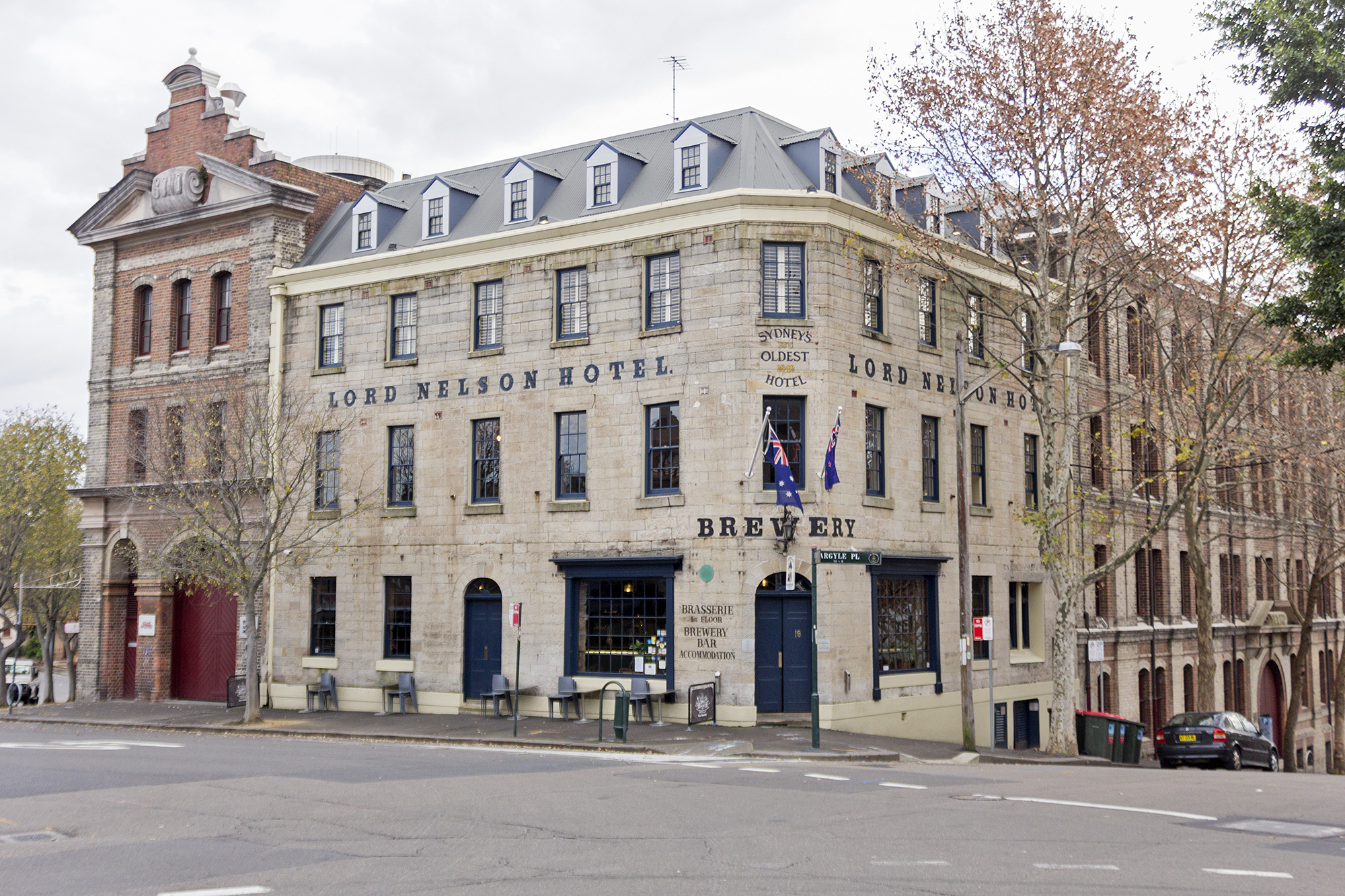
- Lord Nelson Hotel in 2014

- Location within Sydney Location within Australia
- 33.8582°S 151.2033°E
- Location: 19 Kent Street, Millers Point, Sydney, New South Wales, Australia

History
- Built: 1835

Site notes
- Architect: Michael Lehane

New South Wales Heritage Register
- Official name: Lord Nelson Hotel
- Type: state heritage (built)
- Designated: 2 April 1999
- Reference no.: 509
- Type: Hotel
- Category: Commercial

The Lord Nelson Hotel is a heritage-listed pub and hotel located at 19 Kent Street, Millers Point, Sydney, New South Wales, Australia. It was built by James Dempsey around 1814 to 1815. James Dempsey was originally a stonemason born in Ireland. It is the oldest working licensed hotel in Sydney. It was added to the New South Wales State Heritage Register on 2 April 1999.

== History ==
Millers Point was originally named by Europeans as Cockle Bay Point but was renamed Miller's Point after an ex-convict, John "Jack the Miller" Leighton. The area at the north end of Kent Street and the western end of Windmill Street was known as "The Quarries" and supplied a large part of the early stone for Sydney. The land on which the hotel is situated was part of two Crown grants: to the plasterer Wells dated 14 May 1836 and (in trust) to Richard Drier dated 30 November 1840. A census of 1834, however, indicates that there were three William Wells living in Kent and Argyle Streets in the 1830s.

The Lord Nelson was constructed during the late 1830s by William Wells. Records indicate that Wells may have been a plasterer by trade, but that cannot be confirmed by contemporaneous directories. The architect was Michael Lehane.

Wells is believed to have lived on the opposite corner to the Sailor's Return in the present day Lord Nelson until 1842, when the liquor licence for the hotel was granted. The sandstone blocks are believed to have been quarried from the area at the base of Observatory Hill. The Lord Nelson is the oldest working licensed hotel in Sydney from the time of licence, in June 1842.

Sands Directories dating back to 1858 indicate that the Lord Nelson Hotel was occupied on and off by Charles J Sounders between 1860 and 1866. In 1867, it appears that the property was repurchased by William Wells, who had occupied the building from the time of its construction until 1858. He remained in the building until 1870 before John Henwood and Alfred C. Wells, possibly a son or relative of William, took over. In the following years leading up to the turn of the century, the building was occupied by numerous people. Most notable for their lengthy occupation were Robert Drysdale, John H. Ferguson, William Adams and Patrick Powell.

The property was transferred to the Sydney Storage Company in 1891, and part of it was leased back to Patrick Powell in 1893. A further lease took place in 1900 by the Sydney Storage Company to L. H. G. Oswald. The Oswalds were to construct the Oswald Bond Stores on either side of the building.

The property was resumed by the Minister for Public Works in 1901 and vested in the Sydney Harbour Trust Commissioners in 1911 There were numerous proprietors of the hotel after the turn of the century, particularly during the period from 1901 to 1911. From 1911 to 1917, Michael Lehane occupied the building, followed by Terence O'Brien from 1918 to 1928.

On 15 March 1922, approval was given for further alterations to the building. The name of the architect of the modifications cannot be ascertained. It is possible, however, that the work included a remodelling of the second-floor accommodation spaces.

In 1931, Tooth and Co. Ltd, leasing the hotel, reported considerable losses in trade from the high rent payable to the Sydney Harbour Trust. The general manager of Tooth and Co. wrote to the solicitor for the Sydney Harbour Trust Commissioners and stated that for the last 12 months, trade had been continuing to decline. As a result, the terms of the lease were renegotiated.

In 1932, the premises were inspected by District Licensing Inspector Edward G. Allen. The following alterations were required to bring the premises up to the requirements of the Liquor Act 1912 (No. 42): the kitchen and dining rooms to be made fly-proof, the floor covering to be replaced in some rooms, electric lights to be repaired to working order and maintained and certain beds and blinds to be replaced.

In 1936, the property had been registered in the name of the Maritime Services Board of New South Wales. The property consisted of Allotment 15, Section 92, of the City of Sydney, Parish of St. Phillip, County of Cumberland.

In October 1937, the District Licensing Inspector, Mr Sharples, specified for extensive remodelling of the interior to be carried out on the building to bring it into compliance with the Liquor Act 1912. On 11 March 1938, alterations were undertaken, designed by Copeman, Lemont and Keesing architects. The MSB authorised the alterations and granted Tooth and Co. Ltd a 20-year lease of the premises from the date of completion of the remodelling.

In August 1938, bulk and bottled beer refrigeration equipment was installed. In 1947, the refrigeration system was to be replaced and again in 1956.

In 1941, part of the cellar was partitioned off to form a spirit room. The architect was Mr Dalziel.

In 1955 and 1956, work was required to the interior, exterior and services to achieve a reasonable state of repair prior to transfer of Licence between Mr Pearce and Mr Crannery. The work involved general repairs to internal and external surfaces and repairs to services, as recommended by Richard Simpson, architect. In January 1957, the issue of the creation of a saloon bar partition was again raised. It appears that no such partition was constructed. In August, the keg slide was constructed fronting Kent Street.

In August 1958, the architect Ian Smalpage prepared a Schedule of Painting and Repairs to make good defects from fair wear and tear on interiors, exteriors and services at the Lord Nelson Hotel for Tooth and Co Ltd.

In 1963, the MSB leased the property to Percy Cheers for five years. The lease took place after the MSB submitted the property to public tender. From the late 1960s to the early 1980s, the hotel was leased to a number of people.

In the early 1980s, alterations to the value of $100,000 were conducted by the MSB, overseen by Mackay and Taylor. The works most probably involved the restoration of the external facades of the building and may have included the removal of external tiling and render and suspended metal awning.

In 1986, a development application for the hotel was prepared by architect Saxon Rudduck of Adelaide. The application was approved by council and involved the incorporation of the brewery into the hotel on both the basement and the ground floors. Other work included the creation of several openings in the walls of the first floor to provide a large open plan area for the restaurant. The bar was incorporated into the brasserie the following year. The timber-framed roof over the rear deck and service stair was also constructed.

On 1 July 1988, the lue from the ground floor fireplace caused a fire in the building, which affected part of the second-floor accommodation area. One room was severely damaged, and others were affected by pollution and heat.

In 1990, a new exhaust flue was installed in the kitchen. In the 1990s, the hotel was voted "Best Pub" by Great Pubs of Sydney, Best Tourist Hotel by the Australian Hotels Association and Best Pub by the Australian Weekend Magazine.

== Description ==
The Lord Nelson Hotel is a smooth faced, three storey sandstone building in the Old Colonial Regency style. The building has a hipped, corrugated asbestos cement roof, following the "L-shaped" form of the building. The roof cladding is not original and is partially concealed by a decorative parapet and moulded capping, which extends around both facades along the full length of the building.

The building has a splay corner, featuring a central arched doorway with paired timber doors and a fanlight at ground level. A second such arched doorway is situated near the centre of Argyle Street facade. A third door with a flat arch is located in the northern end of the eastern facade.

The street facades on the first and second levels feature regular, multi-paned timber double hung windows. The ground level facades to both Kent and Argyle Streets contain a large, fixed, timber paned window on either side of the splayed corner respectively. The Argyle Street elevation also contains two timber framed sash windows similar to those on the upper levels. The Kent Street elevation contains one such window as well as a deeply recessed set of three tall, narrow, fixed windows. All window openings feature simple, projecting sandstone sills.

A rendered string course at ground level on the Argyle Street facade is continued along the Kent Street facade, below which the sandstone wall has been rendered and painted. A "kegslide" is located in the rendered area of the eastern facade. This is a service hatch allowing beer kegs to be directly loaded from the street to the basement and vice versa.

Internally the building contains five storeys, including a basement level, ground, first and second levels and an attic. The ground floor largely comprises the public bar. The first floor can be described as having two distinct "halves". The southern half of the floor comprises the restaurant seating area, extending from the western wall through to the eastern. The north eastern section, comprising part of the original "L-shaped" plan contains the main stair, a small store and male and female w/cs. The north western infill section contains the galley kitchen and bar, opening to the restaurant, and a sheltered deck area/landing area leading to the service stair.

The second floor contains eight rooms, two bathrooms, two storerooms, a single w/c and a small kitchenette.

The attic space is an open "L-shaped" plan with timber floor and many exposed rafters.

=== Modifications and dates ===
- c. 1836: hotel built.
- 1842–1845: possible extensions to the north and west.
- 1922: remodelling of second floor accommodation.
- 1930s: kitchen and WC.
- 1938: ground floor bar altered, new internal stairs and remodelling of second floor accommodation.
- 1957: keg slide constructed.
- 1960: ground floor bar altered.
- 1980s: general exterior fully restored.
- 1986: brewery incorporated into hotel.
- 1987: deck and service stair enclosed, first floor bar installed.
- 1988: fire due to flue causes damage.

== Heritage listing ==
The Lord Nelson Hotel is highly significant as the oldest working licensed hotel in the city. It was only one of only two hotels in the immediate area to be retained by the Sydney Harbour Trust when Millers Point was resumed during the time of the plague in 1900. The Lord Nelson Hotel is also significant as one of three hotel buildings in the Old Colonial Regency style in the city. The other two include the Hero of Waterloo Hotel and a commercial terrace at 246 George Street. The Lord Nelson is the finest example of the three. It is also significant as it provides a strong contribution to the urban character of the immediate area. The building provides a rare surviving working example of an early hotel from the 19th century. It also has significance as part of a network of corner hotels in the northern end of the city that provided social and recreational venues and budget accommodation. The site may have scientific significance because of the age of the building and its continual use since the early days of European settlement.

Lord Nelson Hotel was listed on the New South Wales State Heritage Register on 2 April 1999 since it satisfied the following criteria:

The place is important in demonstrating the course, or pattern, of cultural or natural history in New South Wales.

The Lord Nelson Hotel is historically significant as part of the network of corner hotels constructed in Millers Point and the Rocks in the nineteenth century. The building predates most of the hotels in the area and is one of the few which was not demolished in the aftermath of the plague at the turn of the century. The Lord nelson is the earliest surviving, continuously trading hotel in Sydney.

The place is important in demonstrating aesthetic characteristics and/or a high degree of creative or technical achievement in New South Wales.

The Lord Nelson Hotel is aesthetically significant as a largely externally intact example of the Old Colonial Regency style, used as a corner hotel. The building also provides a strong contribution to the character of the immediate area.

The place has a strong or special association with a particular community or cultural group in New South Wales for social, cultural or spiritual reasons.

The Lord Nelson Hotel is socially significant as part of the network of corner hotels which provided social/recreational venues and budget accommodation in the northern end of the city. It is also significant for its long term associations with the hotel trade.

The place has potential to yield information that will contribute to an understanding of the cultural or natural history of New South Wales.

The Lord Nelson Hotel has significance as a possible site for scientific investigation due to the age of the building and the continual use of the site from early years of European occupation.

The place possesses uncommon, rare or endangered aspects of the cultural or natural history of New South Wales.

The building is highly significant as a rare surviving example of the Old Colonial Regency style.

The place is important in demonstrating the principal characteristics of a class of cultural or natural places/environments in New South Wales.

The building is representative of the prominent corner hotels which held an important place in the social structure of the city, and particularly in the Millers Point and waterfront area.

== See also ==
- List of pubs in Sydney
- Australian non-residential architectural styles
