= 48–50 Kent Street, Millers Point =

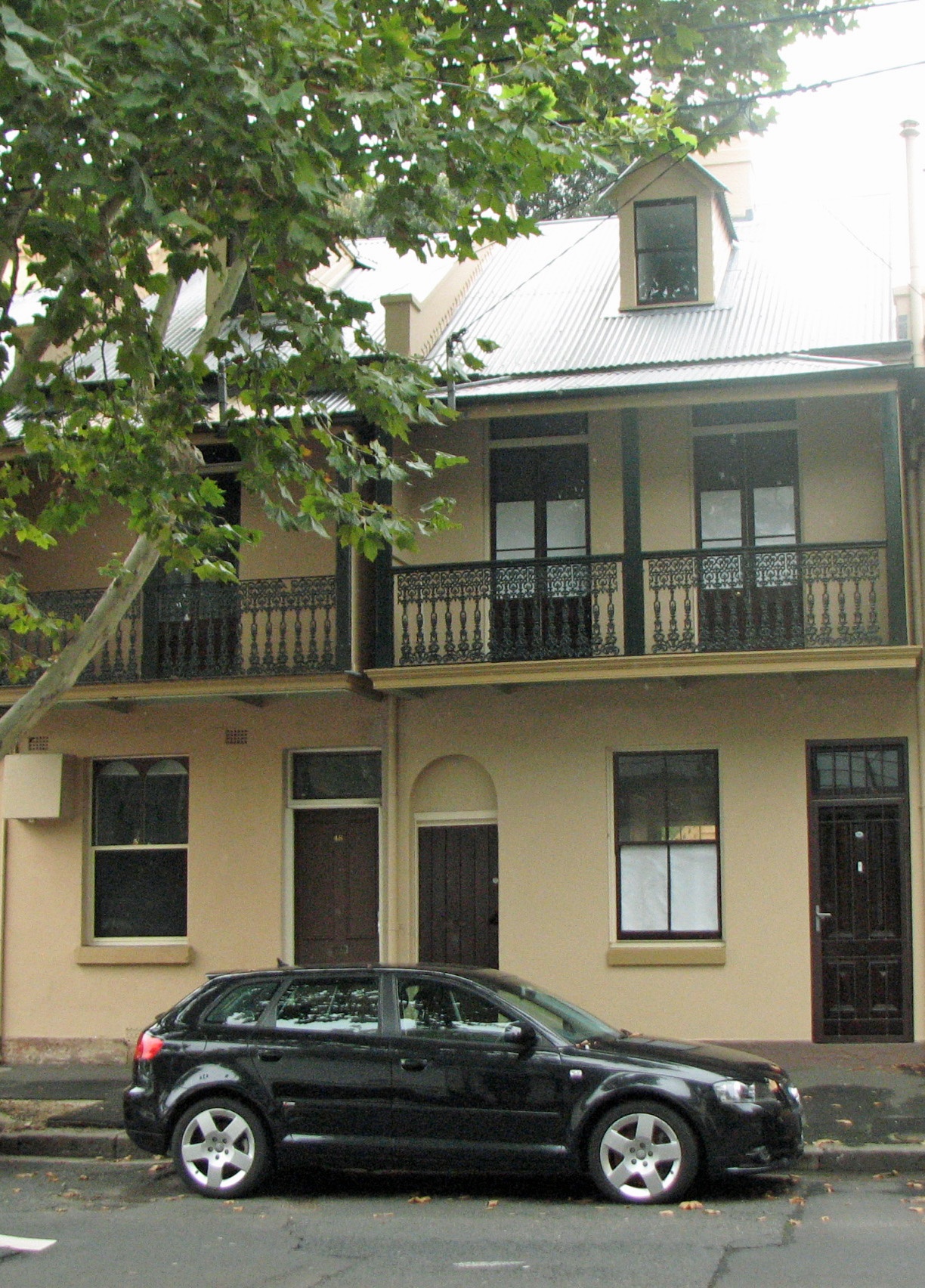
- 48–50 Kent Street, Millers Point, NSW

- Location within Sydney Location within Australia
- 33.8595°S 151.2039°E
- Location: 48, 50 Kent Street, Millers Point, City of Sydney, New South Wales, Australia

Site notes
- Architectural style: Victorian Filigree

New South Wales Heritage Register
- Official name: Terrace House
- Type: State heritage (built)
- Designated: 2 April 1999
- Reference no.: 921
- Type: Historic site

48–50 Kent Street, Millers Point are heritage-listed terrace houses located at 48, 50 Kent Street, in the inner city Sydney suburb of Millers Point in the City of Sydney local government area of New South Wales, Australia. The property was added to the New South Wales State Heritage Register on 2 April 1999.

== History ==
Millers Point is one of the earliest areas of European settlement in Australia, and a focus for maritime activities. Terrace housing built during the 1860s. It was tenanted by the NSW Department of Housing by 1982.

== Description ==
A simple well-proportioned two-storey Victorian terrace house with two bedrooms. Features include a cantilevered balcony over footpath, a corrugated iron verandah painted in wide stripes, two french doors with fanlights on upper storey, panelled front door with fanlight and single window with slab sill on ground floor. Also, a dormer window to attic room.

Storeys: Two; Construction: Painted rendered masonry. Corrugated galvanised iron roof. Timber balcony structure and column supports for verandah roof. Iron lace balustrading. Style: Victorian Filigree.

The external condition of the property is good.

=== Modifications and dates ===
External: Doors replaced. Some iron railing removed. Last inspected: 19 February 1995.

== Heritage listing ==
As at 23 November 2000, this 1860s terrace forms part of a cohesive streetscape element.

It is part of the Millers Point Conservation Area, an intact residential and maritime precinct. It contains residential buildings and civic spaces dating from the 1830s and is an important example of 19th century adaptation of the landscape.

48–50 Kent Street, Millers Point was listed on the New South Wales State Heritage Register on 2 April 1999.

== See also ==
- Australian residential architectural styles
