= Winsbury Terrace =

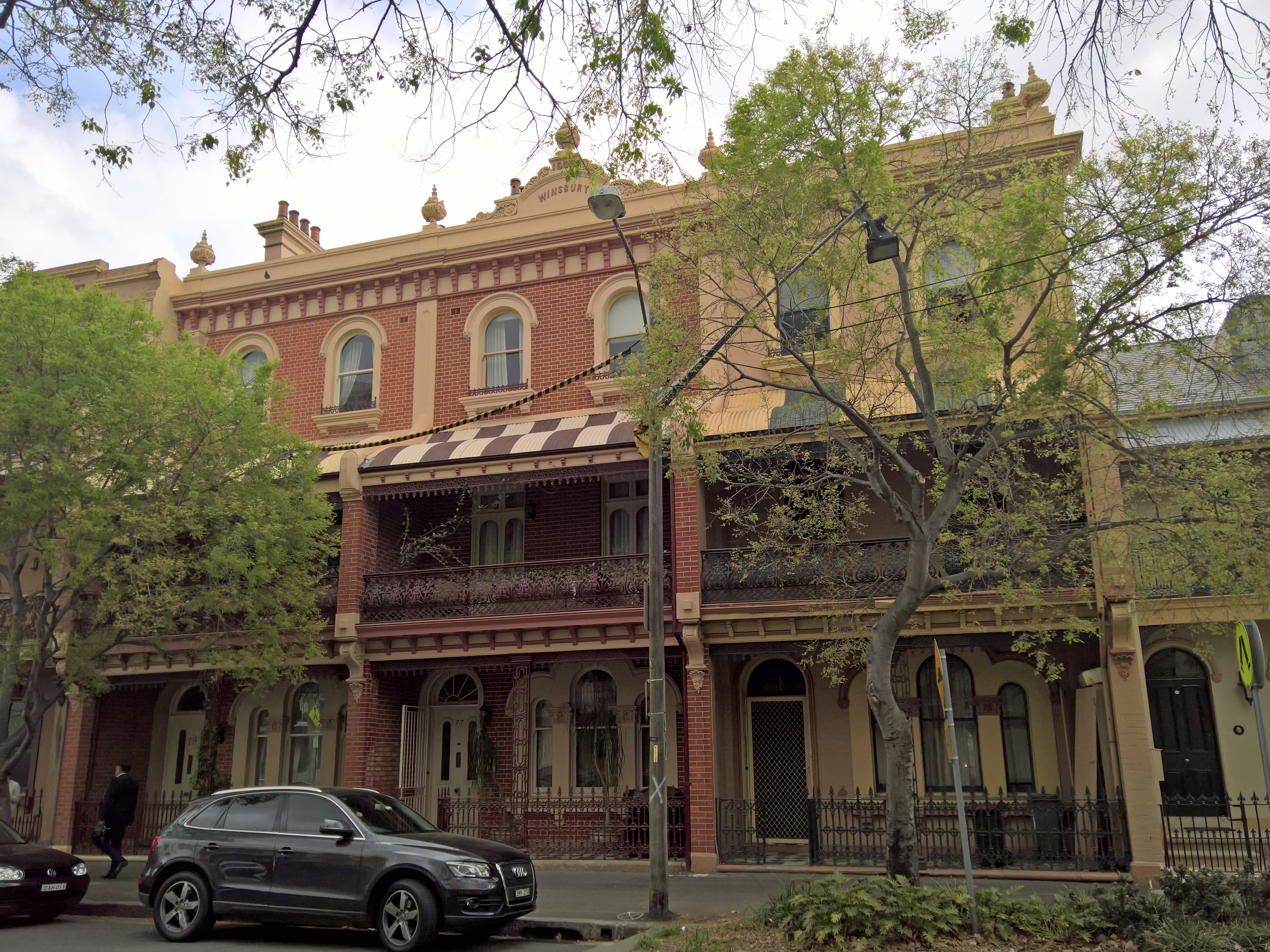
- Winsbury Terrace, pictured in 2018

- Location within Sydney Location within Australia
- 33.8598°S 151.2034°E
- Location: 75, 77, 79 Kent Street, Millers Point, City of Sydney, New South Wales, Australia

History
- Built: 1875–

Site notes
- Architectural styles: Victorian Italianate, Victorian Filigree

New South Wales Heritage Register
- Official name: Winsbury Terrace
- Type: State heritage (built)
- Designated: 2 April 1999
- Reference no.: 930
- Type: Terrace
- Category: Residential buildings (private)

Winsbury Terrace are heritage-listed terrace houses located at 75–79 Kent Street, in the inner city Sydney suburb of Millers Point in the City of Sydney local government area of New South Wales, Australia. It was built from 1875. The property was added to the New South Wales State Heritage Register on 2 April 1999.

== History ==
Millers Point is one of the earliest areas of European settlement in Australia, and a focus for maritime activities.

Millers Point took its name in the early days of the colony from "Jack the Miller", who built his windmills there, while Lieut. Dawes established his observatory on the point. This precinct, positioned between Barangaroo, Observatory Hill and the Sydney Harbour Bridge, contains a variety of architectural styles from early Georgian houses and tiny workmen's cottages, to the grander 19th century Victorian terraces. With much of the area given over to public housing in the 20th century, recent changes in ownership are again breathing life into these early buildings, although the need to ensure any renovation is done sensitively remains imperative.

These large Victorian Italianate terraces are thought to be architect designed and constructed in 1875. They have also been previously known as A.K.A Craig Terrace. First tenanted by the NSW Department of Housing in 1992.

The terrace was the House of Providence rented by the Sisters of Saint Joseph from 30 July 1880; Mary MacKillop resided at the premises from February–March 1881.

== Description ==
Winsbury Terrace is an elaborately detailed Victorian Italianate terrace house (row of three), bowed iron lace to mid floor balcony, triple arched windows to ground floor. Splendid chimney pots. This residence has five bedrooms. Storeys: Three. Construction: Rendered masonry walls, slate roof to main body of house, corrigated galvanised iron to rear wing. Cast iron lace to balcony and ground floor balustrading. No. 77 has elaborate stucco work on the parapet (no. 77) and cornices and window and door surrounds. First floor balcony has most unusual, curved cast iron balustrade panels. Handsome tuck-pointing on Kent Street facade, recently restored by expert craftsmen using authentic materials. Painted timber balcony timbers and joinery. Style: Victorian Italianate.

The external condition of the property is good.

== Heritage listing ==
As at 23 November 2000, this terrace is one of a group of three elaborately detailed Victorian Italianate terrace houses. Rear wings being amongst the most significant on any terrace house in Sydney. They are a significant streetscape element and highly significant rear wings.

It is part of the Millers Point Conservation Area, an intact residential and maritime precinct. It contains residential buildings and civic spaces dating from the 1830s and is an important example of C19th adaptation of the landscape.

Winsbury Terrace was listed on the New South Wales State Heritage Register on 2 April 1999.

== See also ==
- Australian residential architectural styles
