= 44 Kent Street, Millers Point =

Historic terrace house in Australia

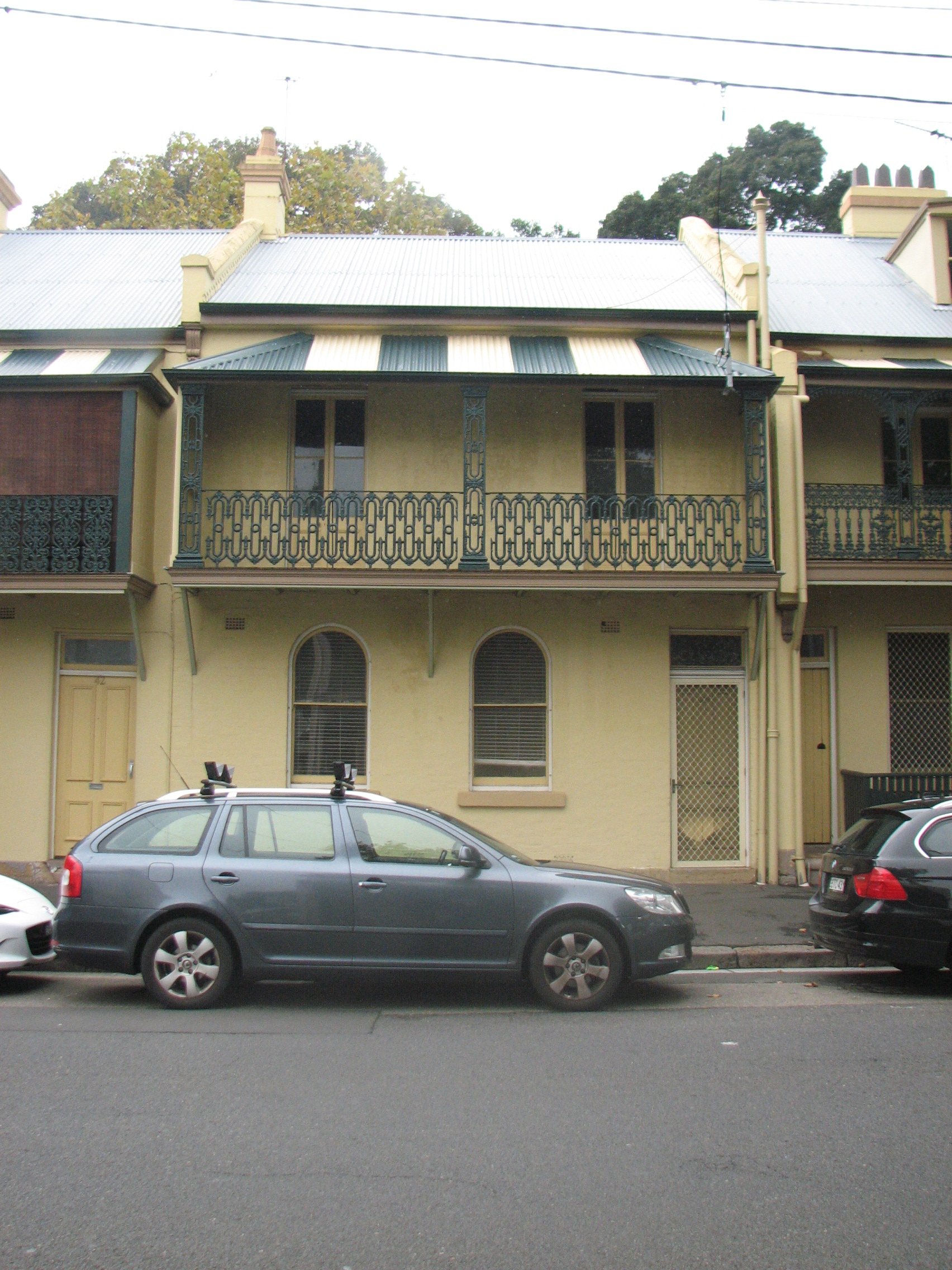
- 44 Kent Street, Millers Point, NSW

- Location within Sydney Location within Australia
- 33.8594°S 151.2039°E
- Location: 44 Kent Street, Millers Point, City of Sydney, New South Wales, Australia

History
- Built: 1860s

Site notes
- Architectural style: Victorian Filigree

New South Wales Heritage Register
- Official name: Terrace
- Type: State heritage (built)
- Designated: 2 April 1999
- Reference no.: 859
- Type: Terrace
- Category: Residential buildings (private)

44 Kent Street, Millers Point is a heritage-listed terrace house located at 44 Kent Street, in the inner city Sydney suburb of Millers Point in the City of Sydney local government area of New South Wales, Australia. It was added to the New South Wales State Heritage Register on 2 April 1999.

== History ==
Millers Point is one of the earliest areas of European settlement in Australia, and a focus for maritime activities. Terrace housing built during the 1860s. First tenanted by NSW Department of Housing in 1982.

== Description ==
A simple well-proportioned two-storey Victorian terrace house with four bedrooms. Features include a cantilevered balcony over footpath, a corrugated iron verandah painted in wide stripes, two french doors on upper storey, panelled front door with fanlight and two sash windows with slab sills on ground floor. Storeys: Two; Construction: Painted rendered masonry. Corrugated galvanised iron roof. Timber balcony structure and cast iron column supports for verandah roof. Iron lace balustrading. Style: Victorian Filigree.

The external condition of the property is good.

=== Modifications and dates ===
External: Doors replaced. Some iron railing removed. Last inspected: 19 February 1995.

== Heritage listing ==
As at 23 November 2000, this 1860s terrace forms part of a cohesive streetscape element.

It is part of the Millers Point Conservation Area, an intact residential and maritime precinct. It contains residential buildings and civic spaces dating from the 1830s and is an important example of 19th century adaptation of the landscape.

44 Kent Street, Millers Point was listed on the New South Wales State Heritage Register on 2 April 1999.

== See also ==
- Australian residential architectural styles
