= Katoomba House =

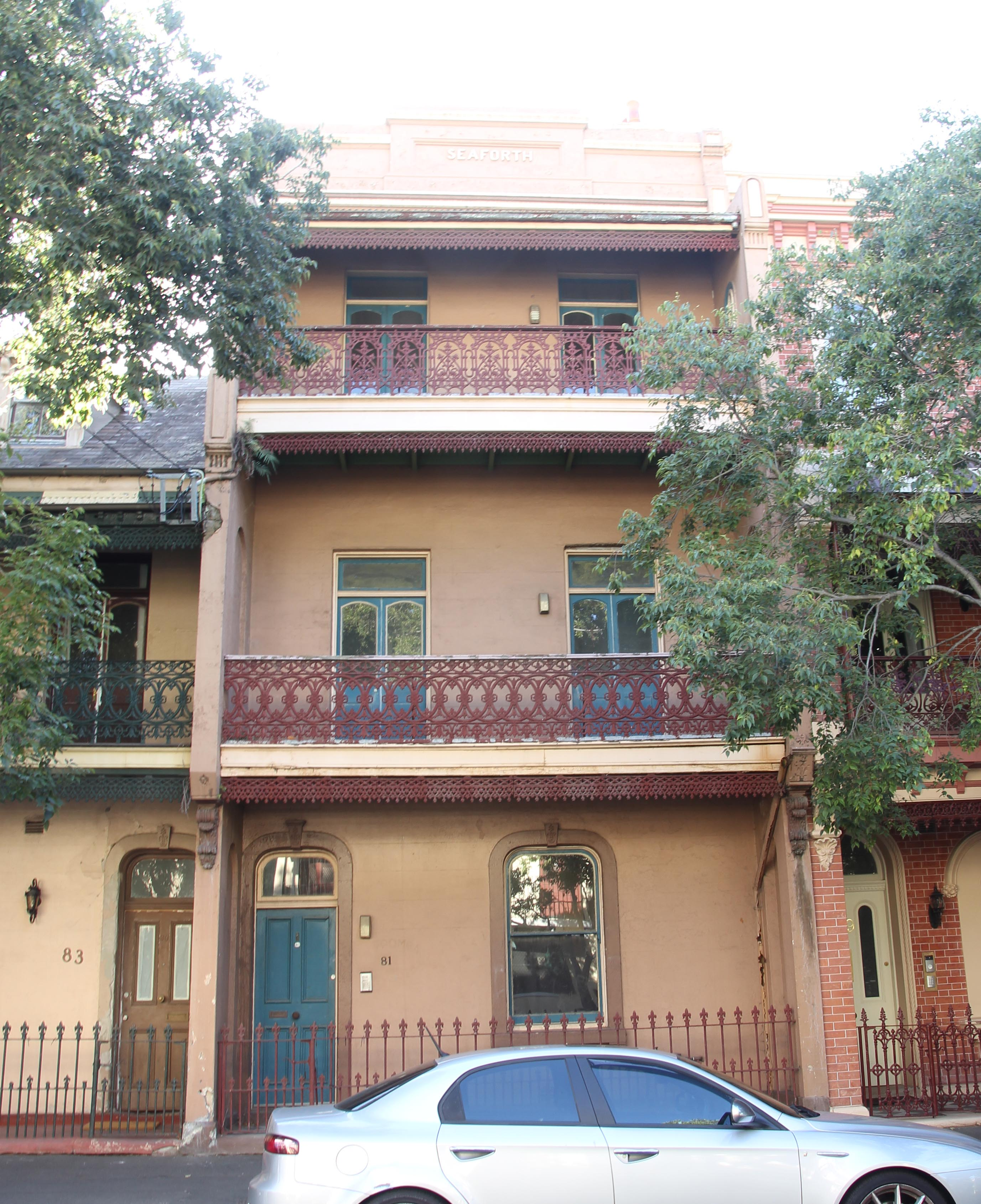
- Katoomba House, pictured in 2019

- Location within Sydney Location within Australia
- 33.8599°S 151.2034°E
- Location: 81 Kent Street, Millers Point, City of Sydney, New South Wales, Australia

Site notes
- Architectural style: Victorian Italianate

New South Wales Heritage Register
- Official name: Katoomba House; Seaforth House
- Type: State heritage (built)
- Designated: 2 April 1999
- Reference no.: 890
- Type: historic site

Katoomba House is a heritage-listed residence at 81 Kent Street, in the inner city Sydney suburb of Millers Point in the City of Sydney local government area of New South Wales, Australia. It is also known as Seaforth House. It was added to the New South Wales State Heritage Register on 2 April 1999.

== History ==
Millers Point is one of the earliest areas of European settlement in Australia, and a focus for maritime activities. This imposing three-storey Victorian Italianate house with verandahs to both upper floors was originally a two-storey house with additions c. 1885. First tenanted by the NSW Department of Housing in 1985.

== Description ==
A large, three storey Victorian Italianate house in good condition. Very important rear wing is lined by Victorian balconies (the upper floor built post 1880). This residence has four bedrooms. Storeys: Three; Construction: Painted rendered masonry walls, slate roof to main body of house, corrugated galvanised iron to balcony verandah, and rear wing. Cast iron balcony lace. Style: Victorian.

The external condition of the property is good.

=== Modifications and dates ===
External: 3rd floor c. 1885. Last inspected: 19 February 1995.

== Heritage listing ==
As at 23 November 2000, this building is an imposing three storey Victorian Italianate house with verandahs to both upper floors.

It is part of the Millers Point Conservation Area, an intact residential and maritime precinct. It contains residential buildings and civic spaces dating from the 1830s and is an important example of 19th century adaptation of the landscape.

Katoomba House was listed on the New South Wales State Heritage Register on 2 April 1999.

== See also ==
- Australian residential architectural styles
