= 14–22 Trinity Avenue, Millers Point =

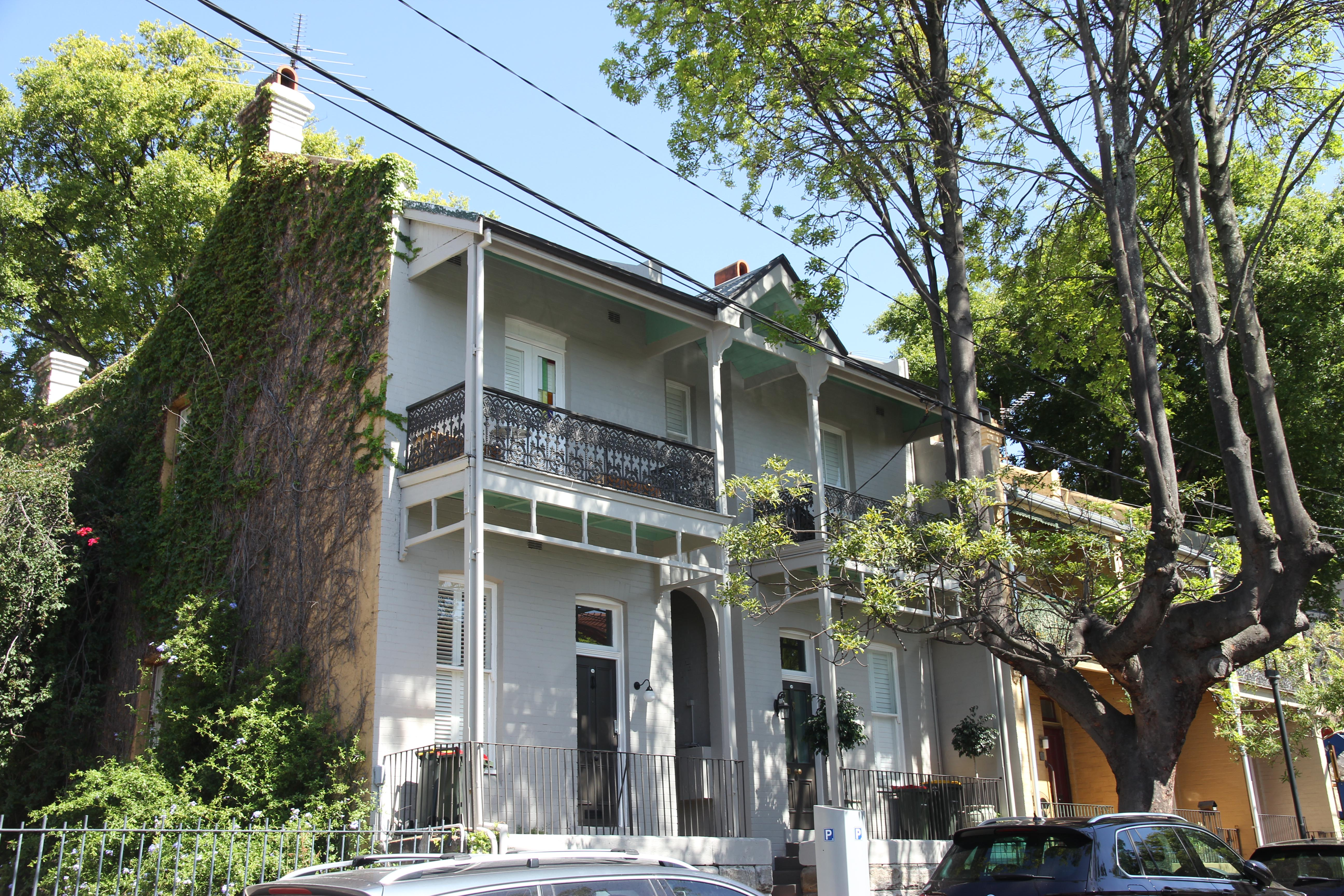
- 14–22 Trinity Avenue, Millers Point, pictured in 2019

- Location within Sydney Location within Australia
- 33.8578°S 151.2066°E
- Location: 14, 16, 18, 20, 22 Trinity Avenue, Millers Point, City of Sydney, New South Wales, Australia

Site notes
- Architectural style: Victorian Filigree

New South Wales Heritage Register
- Official name: Terrace
- Type: State heritage (built)
- Designated: 2 April 1999
- Reference no.: 911
- Type: Terrace
- Category: Residential buildings (private)

14–22 Trinity Avenue, Millers Point is a heritage-listed residence located at 14–22 Trinity Avenue, in the inner city Sydney suburb of Millers Point in the City of Sydney local government area of New South Wales, Australia. The property was added to the New South Wales State Heritage Register on 2 April 1999.

== History ==
Millers Point is one of the earliest areas of European settlement in Australia, and a focus for maritime activities. This group of terrace houses was built late in the 1880s, as the long boom was nearing its end. First tenanted by the NSW Department of Housing in 1982.

== Description ==
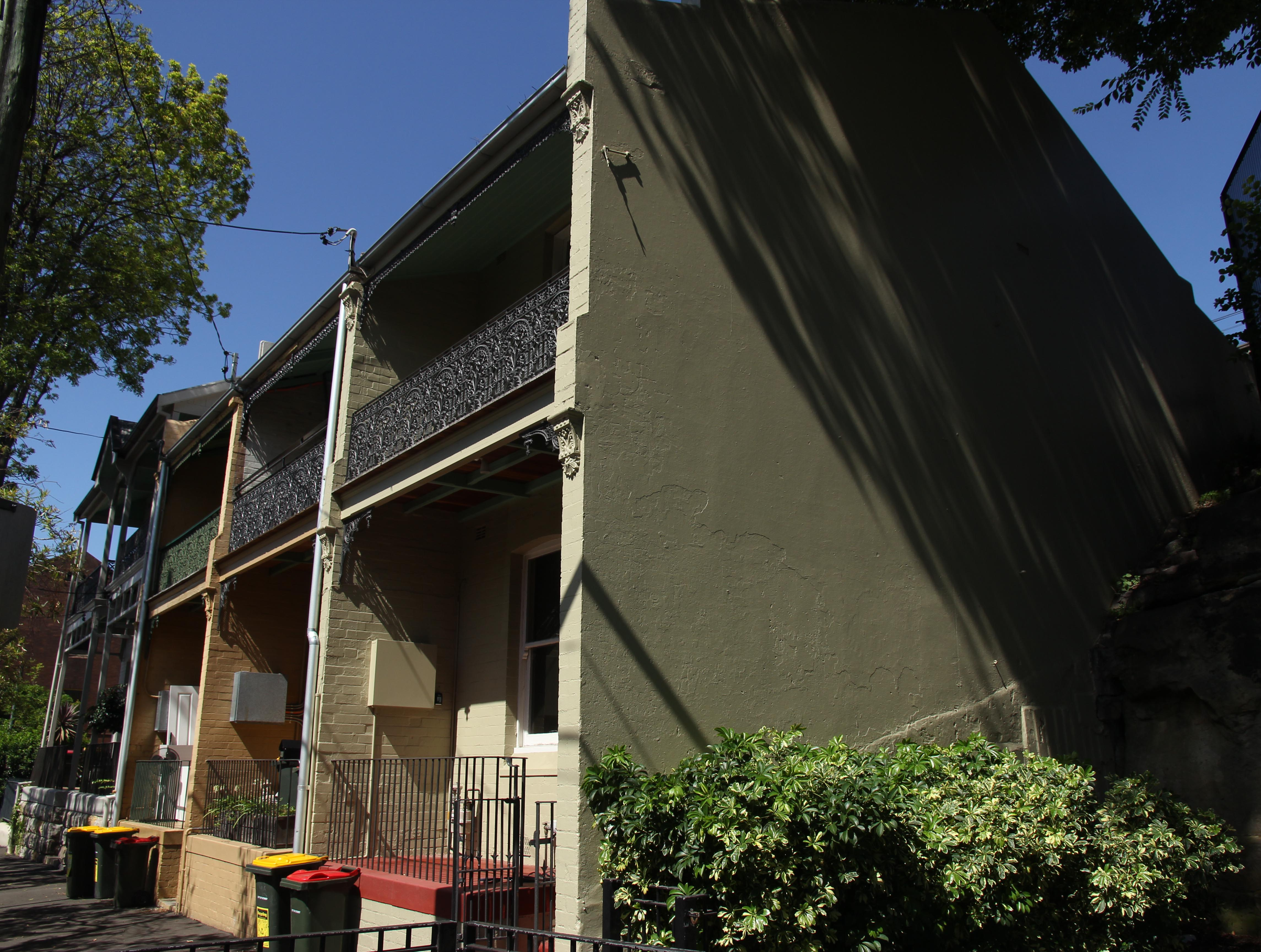
22 Trinity Avenue, pictured in 2019, looking towards 14 Trinity Avenue.

Two storey late Victorian terrace with two bedrooms. Two-storey timber balcony with iron lace balustrading. French doors to upper storey balcony, sloping sill to ground floor window. False windows with shutters to upper storey. Storeys: Two Construction: Painted brick walls stone base, corrugated galvanised iron roof. Painted timber joinery. Style: Victorian Filigree.

Externally, the building is in a good condition.

=== Modifications and dates ===
External: Timber brackets removed.

== Heritage listing ==
As at 18 May 2017, this 1880s terrace house represents a significant streetscape element.

It is part of the Millers Point Conservation Area, an intact residential and maritime precinct. It contains residential buildings and civic spaces dating from the 1830s and is an important example of C19th adaptation of the landscape.

Terrace was listed on the New South Wales State Heritage Register on 2 April 1999.

== See also ==
- Australian residential architectural styles
