= 21–29 Kent Street, Millers Point =

21–29 Kent Street
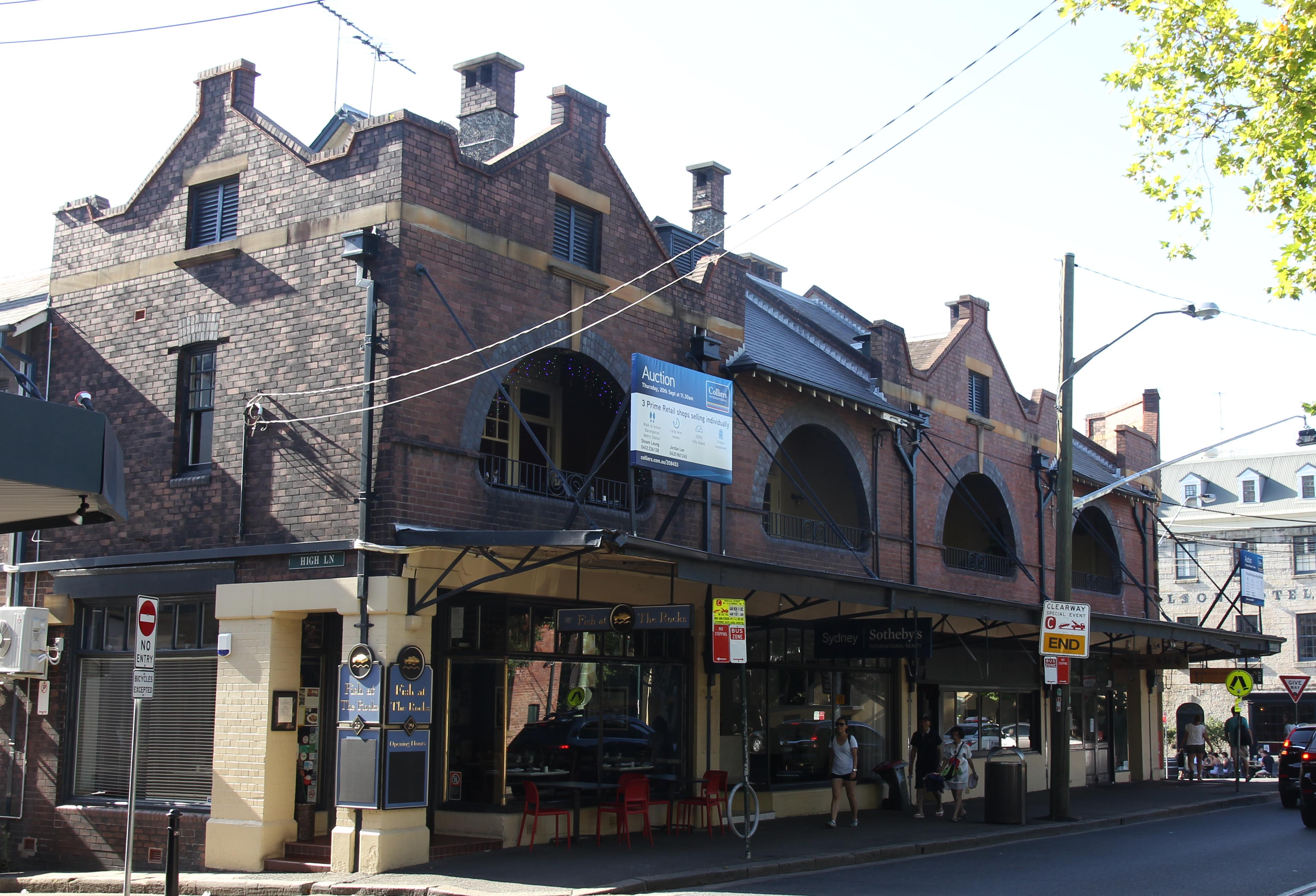
- Shops, restaurants, and residences located at 21–29 Kent Street, pictured in 2019

- Location within Sydney Location within Australia
- 33.8586°S 151.2033°E
- Location: 21, 23, 25, 27, 29 Kent Street, Millers Point, City of Sydney, New South Wales, Australia

History
- Built: c. 1911

Site notes
- Architectural style: Federation

New South Wales Heritage Register
- Official name: Edwardian Shop/Residences
- Type: State heritage (built)
- Designated: 2 April 1999
- Reference no.: 888
- Type: Shop
- Category: Retail and Wholesale

21–29 Kent Street is a heritage-listed row of shops with second-storey residences at 21, 23, 25, 27 and 29 Kent Street, in the inner city Sydney suburb of Millers Point in the City of Sydney local government area of New South Wales, Australia. It is also known as Edwardian Shop and Residences. It was added to the New South Wales State Heritage Register on 2 April 1999.

== History ==
Millers Point is one of the earliest areas of European settlement in Australia, and a focus for maritime activities. This is a well-detailed commercial development with residences above. It was built c. 1911 as part of the post-bubonic plague redevelopment by the Sydney Harbour Trust. It was first tenanted by the NSW Department of Housing in 1986.

== Description ==
An interesting Federation-style two-storey stone and face brick detailed Edwardian shop/residence, one of a group. It forms an important streetscape element. It features a recessed verandah, slate roof, decorative ventilators to gable ends, and awnings over footpaths tied back with iron rods.

The shop fronts have been altered over time. Services have been added to the external fabric.

== Heritage listing ==
An early twentieth century commercial development which was carried out as part of the post-plague redevelopment of the area. It was important to the Millers Point streetscape.

It is part of the Millers Point Conservation Area, an intact residential and maritime precinct. It contains residential buildings and civic spaces dating from the 1830s and is an important example of nineteenth-century adaptation of the landscape.

Edwardian Shop was listed on the New South Wales State Heritage Register on 2 April 1999.

== See also ==
- Australian residential architectural styles
