= 18–22 Kent Street, Millers Point =

18–22 Kent Street
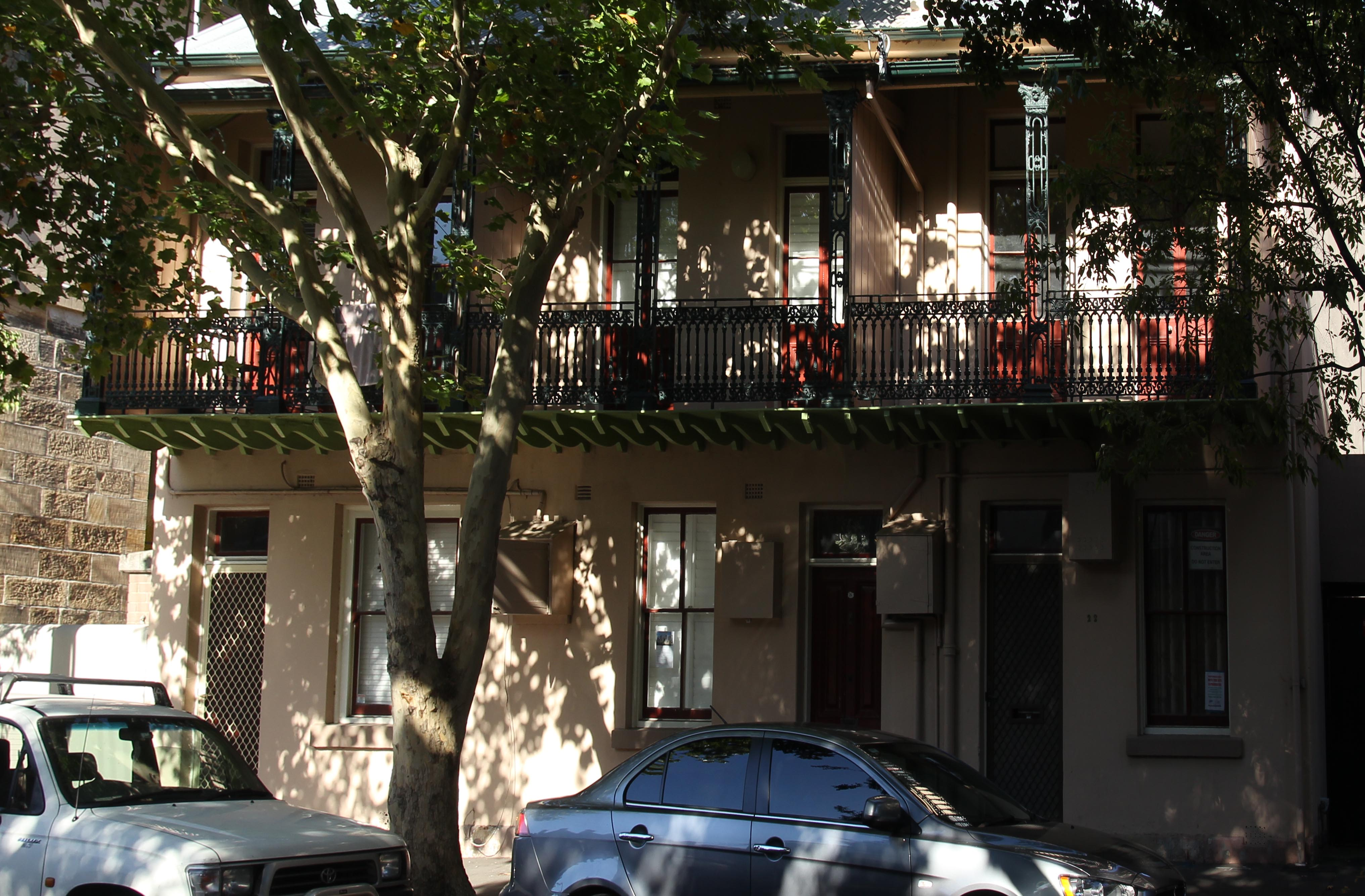
- 18–22 Kent Street, pictured in 2019

- Location within Sydney Location within Australia
- 33.8588°S 151.2038°E
- Location: 18, 20, 22 Kent Street, Millers Point, City of Sydney, New South Wales, Australia

History
- Built: c. 1860s

Site notes
- Architectural style: Victorian Filigree

New South Wales Heritage Register
- Official name: Terrace
- Type: State heritage (built)
- Designated: 2 April 1999
- Reference no.: 917
- Type: Terrace
- Category: Residential buildings (private)

18–22 Kent Street is a heritage-listed row of three terrace houses located at 18, 20 and 22 Kent Street, in the inner city Sydney suburb of Millers Point in the City of Sydney local government area of New South Wales, Australia. It was added to the New South Wales State Heritage Register on 2 April 1999.

== History ==
Millers Point is one of the earliest areas of European settlement in Australia, and a focus for maritime activities. 18-22 Kent Street is terrace housing built during the 1860s. It was first tenanted by NSW Department of Housing in 1982.

== Description ==
A two-storey Victorian Filigree terrace house with three bedrooms. Features include painted stuccoed masonry, a cantilevered balcony over footpath, cast iron balustrade and verandah supports, a corrugated iron verandah, two french doors with fanlights on upper storey, fanlight over front door and a sash window with slab sill on ground floor.

== Heritage listing ==
This 1860s terrace forms part of a cohesive streetscape element.

It is part of the Millers Point Conservation Area, an intact residential and maritime precinct. It contains residential buildings and civic spaces dating from the 1830s and is an important example of nineteenth-century adaptation of the landscape.

18–22 Kent Street was listed on the New South Wales State Heritage Register on 2 April 1999.

== See also ==
- Australian residential architectural styles
