= 60–62 Kent Street, Millers Point =

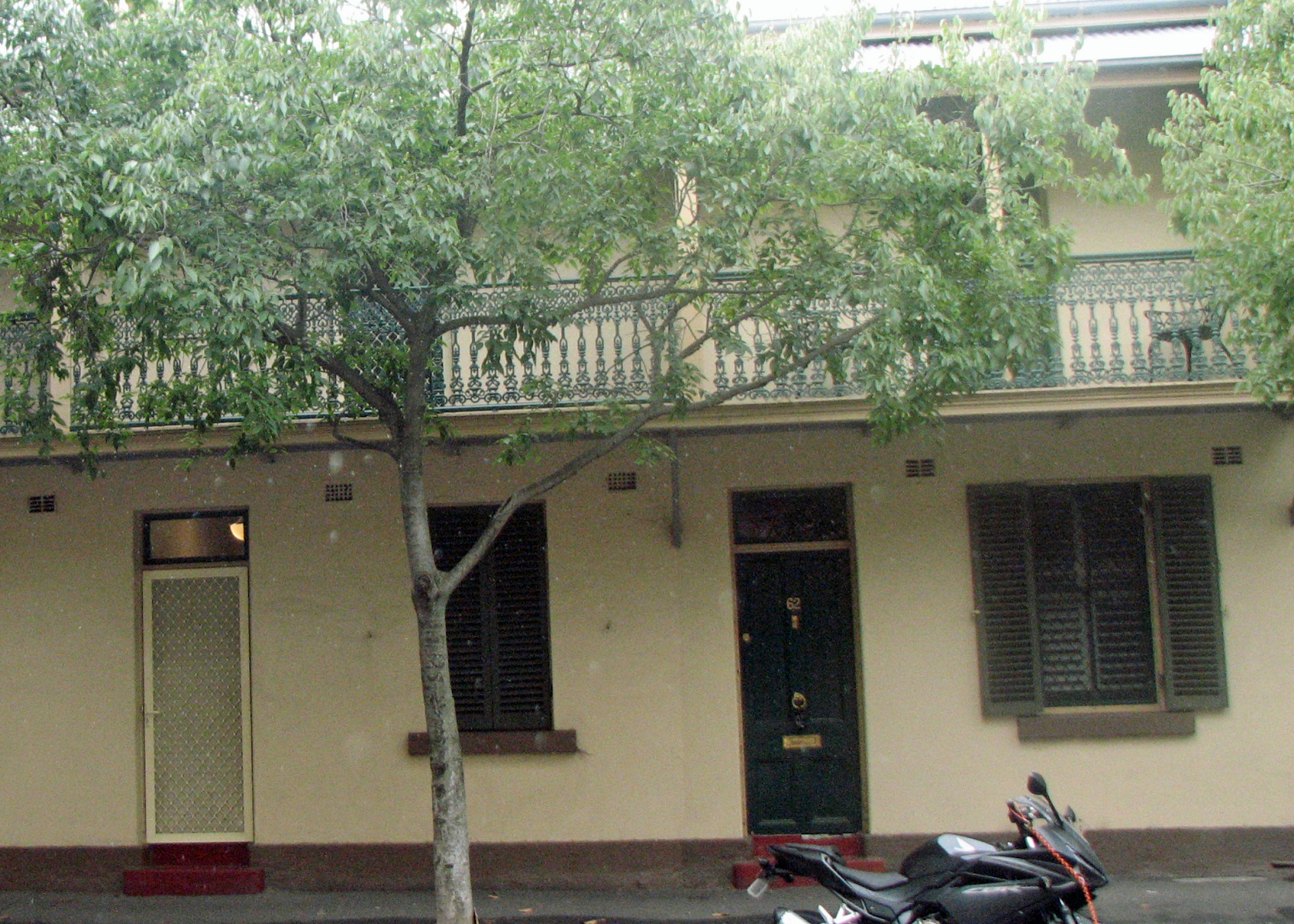
- 60–62 Kent Street, Millers Point, NSW
- Interactive map of 60–62 Kent Street, Millers Point
- 33.8598°S 151.2039°E
- Location: 60, 62 Kent Street, Millers Point, City of Sydney, New South Wales, Australia

Site notes
- Architectural style: Victorian Filigree

New South Wales Heritage Register
- Official name: Terraces
- Type: State heritage (built)
- Designated: 2 April 1999
- Reference no.: 909
- Type: Terrace
- Category: Residential buildings (private)

60–62 Kent Street, Millers Point are heritage-listed terrace houses located at 60–62 Kent Street, in the inner city Sydney suburb of Millers Point in the City of Sydney local government area of New South Wales, Australia. It was added to the New South Wales State Heritage Register on 2 April 1999.

== History ==
Millers Point is one of the earliest areas of European settlement in Australia, and a focus for maritime activities. Terrace housing built during the 1860s. First tenanted by the NSW Department of Housing in 1982.

== Description ==
A simple well proportioned two-storey Victorian terrace house with two bedrooms. Features include a cantilevered balcony over footpath, a corrugated iron verandah painted in wide stripes, french doors with fanlight on upper storey, panelled front door with fanlight and single window with slab sill and shutters on ground floor. Storeys: Two; Construction: Painted rendered masonry, corrugated galvanised iron roof. Timber framed balcony with decorative iron lace balcony. Painted timber joinery. Style: Victorian Filigree.

The external condition of the property is good.

=== Modifications and dates ===
External: Some timber joinery is new.

== Heritage listing ==
As at 23 November 2000, this 1860s terrace forms part of a cohesive streetscape element.

It is part of the Millers Point Conservation Area, an intact residential and maritime precinct. It contains residential buildings and civic spaces dating from the 1830s and is an important example of 19th century adaptation of the landscape.

60–62 Kent Street, Millers Point was listed on the New South Wales State Heritage Register on 2 April 1999.

== See also ==
- Australian residential architectural styles
