= 14–16 Merriman Street, Millers Point =

14-16 Merriman Street, Millers Point
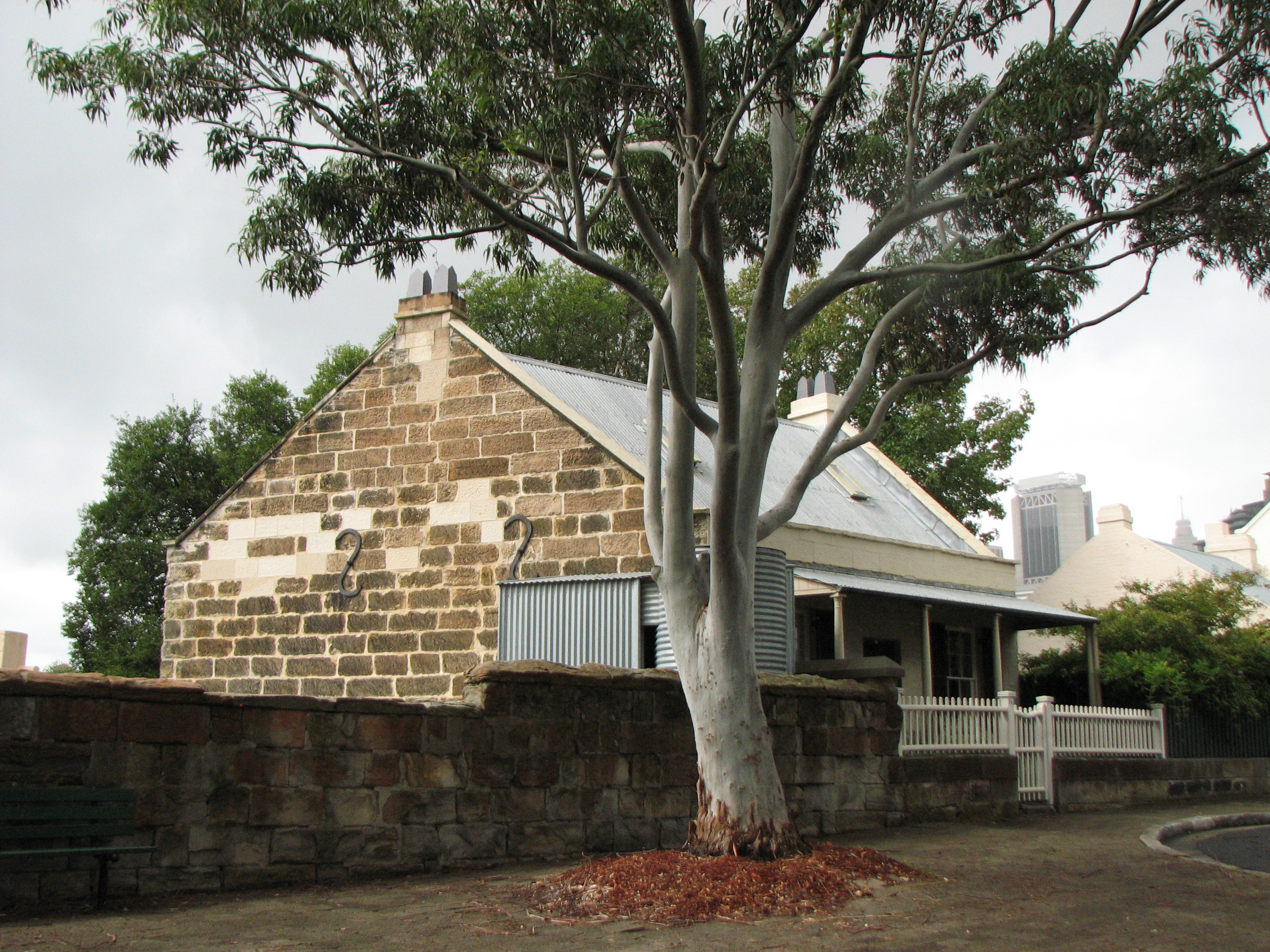
- A view of 14-16 Merriman Street, Millers Point, New South Wales

- Location within Sydney Location within Australia
- 33.8571°S 151.2020°E
- Location: 14-16 Merriman Street, Millers Point, City of Sydney, New South Wales, Australia

History
- Built: 1837–c. 1840

Site notes
- Architectural style: Victorian Georgian

New South Wales Heritage Register
- Official name: Stone Cottage & Wall
- Type: State heritage (built)
- Designated: 2 April 1999
- Reference no.: 840
- Type: historic site

14-16 Merriman Street, Millers Point is a heritage-listed stone cottage located at 14-16 Merriman Street, in the inner city Sydney suburb of Millers Point in the City of Sydney local government area of New South Wales, Australia. It was built from 1837 to c. 1840. It is also known as Stone Cottage & Wall. The property was added to the New South Wales State Heritage Register on 2 April 1999.

== History ==
Millers Point is one of the earliest areas of European settlement in Australia, and a focus for maritime activities. Merriman Street contains a substantial collection of Georgian style houses and terraces.

Millers Point took its name in the early days of the colony from "Jack the Miller", who built his windmills there, while Lieut. Dawes established his observatory on the point. This precinct, positioned between Barangaroo, Observatory Hill and the Sydney Harbour Bridge, contains a variety of architectural styles from early Georgian houses and tiny workmen's cottages, to the grander 19th century Victorian terraces. With much of the area given over to public housing in the 20th century, recent changes in ownership are again breathing life into these early buildings, although the need to ensure any renovation is done sensitively remains imperative.

This cottage was built c. 1840, first tenanted by the NSW Department of Housing in 1986. Important local history item, possibly residence for the supervisor of the A.A. Co. wharf.

== Description ==
Georgian, two bedroom, stone cottage, single storey with gable ends. Corrugated iron verandah with timber posts. Storeys: One; Construction: Painted stone, face to gable ends. Corrugated galvanised iron roof. Painted timber joinery. Style: Georgian.

Small, 1837 working man's cottage on the level crest of the sandstone cliff that forms its foundation on the site where Barangaroo meets Millers Point. Cr Clive Lucas, the principal of Clive Lucas, Stapleton & Partners, was commissioned to conserve the by-then severely dilapidated cottage and create an imaginative and comfortable home for modern living, which respects and retains elements of its early life as a blacksmith's cottage and workplace.

The external condition of the property is good.

=== Modifications and dates ===
External: Stone parapet modified. Verandah roof altered.

== Heritage listing ==
As at 23 November 2000, 14-16 Merriman Street contains housing groups of the utmost historical importance. This stone cottage was possibly a residence for the supervisor of the A. A. Co. wharf.

It is part of the Millers Point Conservation Area, an intact residential and maritime precinct. It contains residential buildings and civic spaces dating from the 1830s and is an important example of C19th adaptation of the landscape.

14-16 Merriman Street, Millers Point was listed on the New South Wales State Heritage Register on 2 April 1999.
