= 66–68 Bettington Street, Millers Point =

66–68 Bettington Street
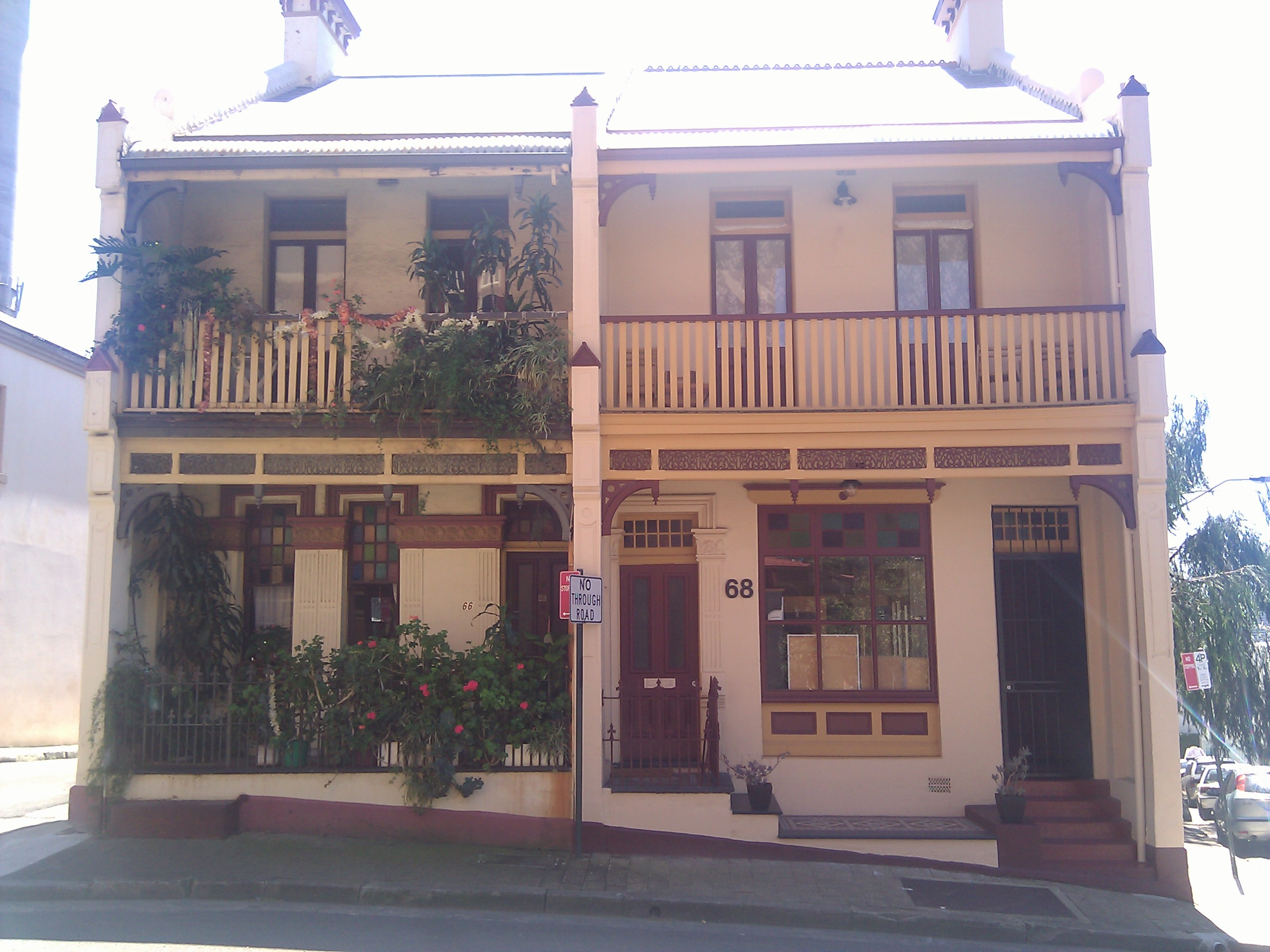

- Location within Sydney Location within Australia
- 33.8577°S 151.2023°E
- Location: 66, 68 Bettington Street, Millers Point, City of Sydney, New South Wales, Australia

History
- Built: c. 1900

Site notes
- Architectural style: Edwardian

New South Wales Heritage Register
- Official name: Edwardian Terrace
- Type: State heritage (built)
- Designated: 2 April 1999
- Reference no.: 848
- Type: Terrace
- Category: Residential buildings (private)

66–68 Bettington Street is a heritage-listed Edwardian terrace house located at 66–68 Bettington Street, in the inner city Sydney suburb of Millers Point in the City of Sydney local government area of New South Wales, Australia. It was added to the New South Wales State Heritage Register on 2 April 1999.

== History ==
Millers Point is one of the earliest areas of European settlement in Australia, and a focus for maritime activities. An 1885 Trig. survey shows an earlier single residence with front verandah on this site. 1900 Resumption plans show vacant site owned by Bridget Carinan. The pair of Edwardian terraces built here soon after, and today they are mostly intact. They were first tenanted by NSW Department of Housing in 1986.

The Tenants' Union of NSW occupied 68 Bettington Street on a peppercorn rent with the Department of Housing from April 1988 until at least 1999.

== Description ==
66–68 Bettington Street is a fine two-storey, three bedroom Edwardian terrace with tiled verandah, coloured glass windows, slate roof and timber and cast iron verandahs.

== Heritage listing ==
This is one of a pair of fine Edwardian terraces, constructed c. 1900 with original external detailing intact.

It is part of the Millers Point Conservation Area, which is an intact residential and maritime precinct. It contains residential buildings and civic spaces dating from the 1830s and is an important example of nineteenth-century adaptation of the landscape.

Edwardian Terrace was listed on the New South Wales State Heritage Register on 2 April 1999.

== See also ==
- Australian residential architectural styles
