= Linsley Terrace =

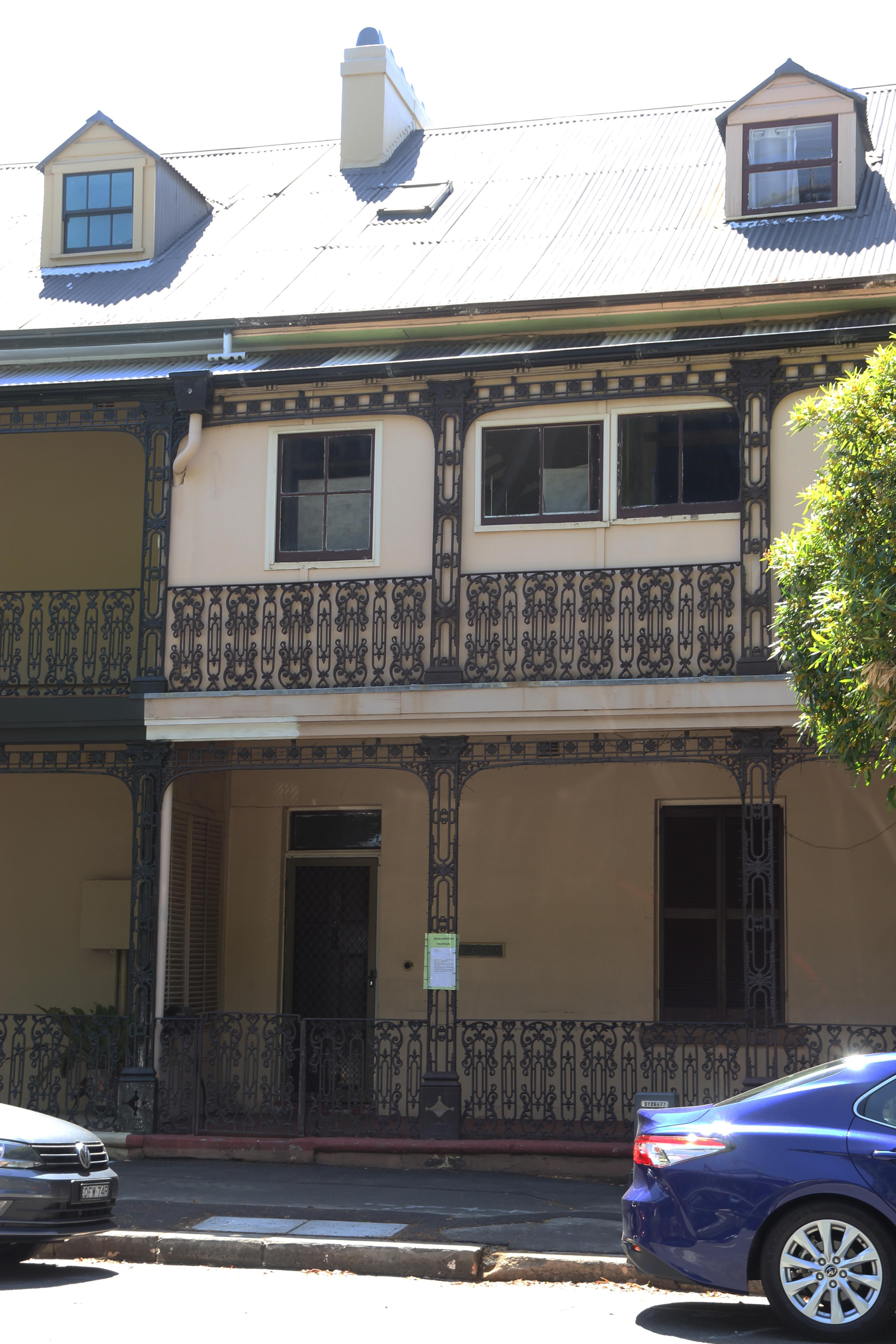
- 29 Lower Fort Street, pictured in 2019

- Location within Sydney Location within Australia
- 33.8562°S 151.2074°E
- Location: 25, 27, 29, 31, 33, 35 Lower Fort Street, Millers Point, City of Sydney, New South Wales, Australia

History
- Built: 1830

Site notes
- Architectural styles: Victorian Georgian, Victorian Filigree

New South Wales Heritage Register
- Official name: Linsley Terrace; Major House
- Type: State heritage (built)
- Designated: 2 April 1999
- Reference no.: 907
- Type: Terrace
- Category: Residential buildings (private)

Linsley Terrace is a series of heritage-listed terrace houses located at 25–35 Lower Fort Street, in the inner city Sydney suburb of Millers Point in the City of Sydney local government area of New South Wales, Australia. It was built from 1830. It is also known as Major House. The property was added to the New South Wales State Heritage Register on 2 April 1999.

== History ==
Millers Point is one of the earliest areas of European settlement in Australia, and a focus for maritime activities. This group of early nineteenth century terraces represent a significant streetscape element. First tenanted by Department of Housing in 1984.

== Description ==
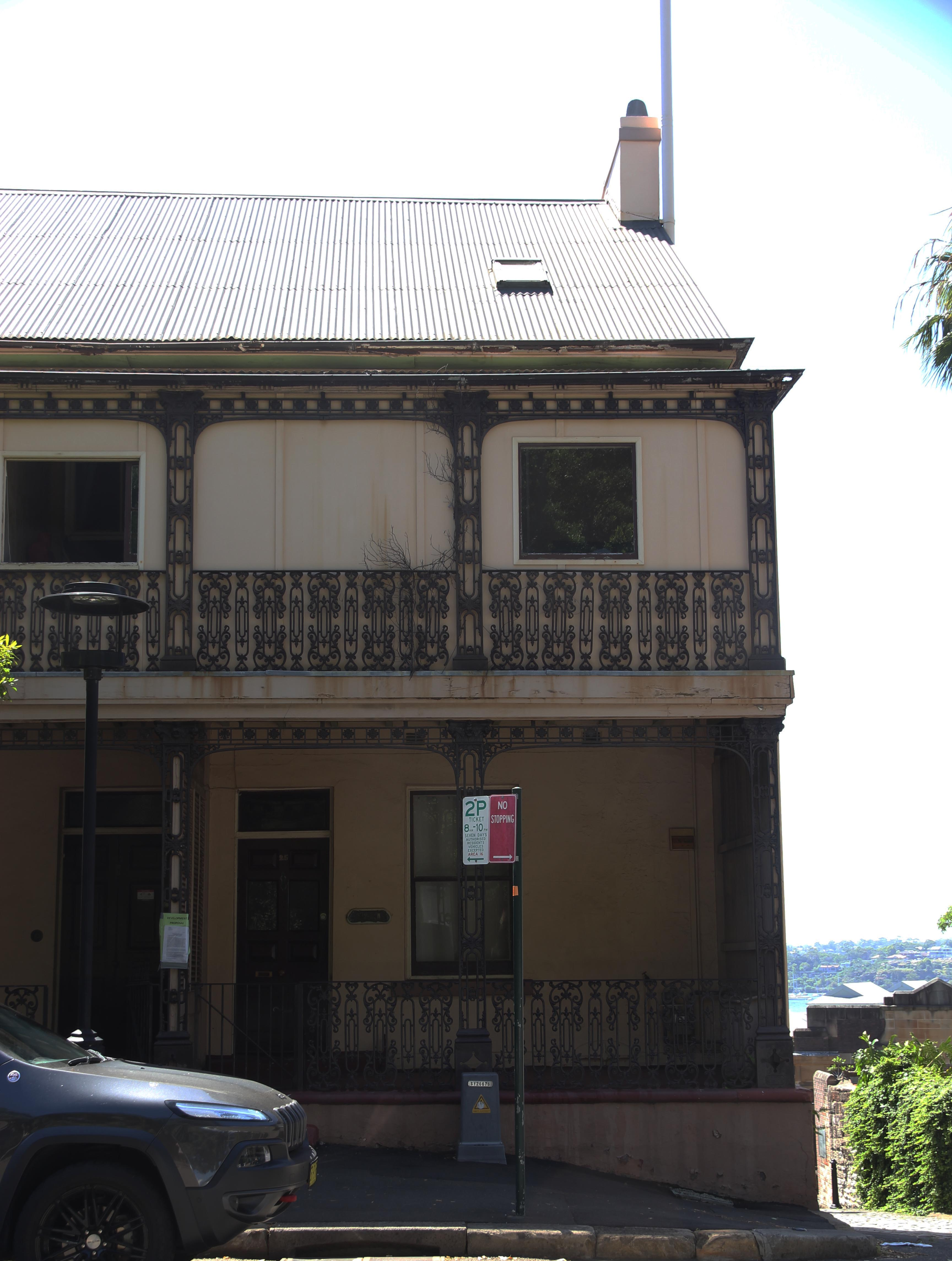
The north-most terrace house, No. 25 Lower Fort Street, pictured in 2019

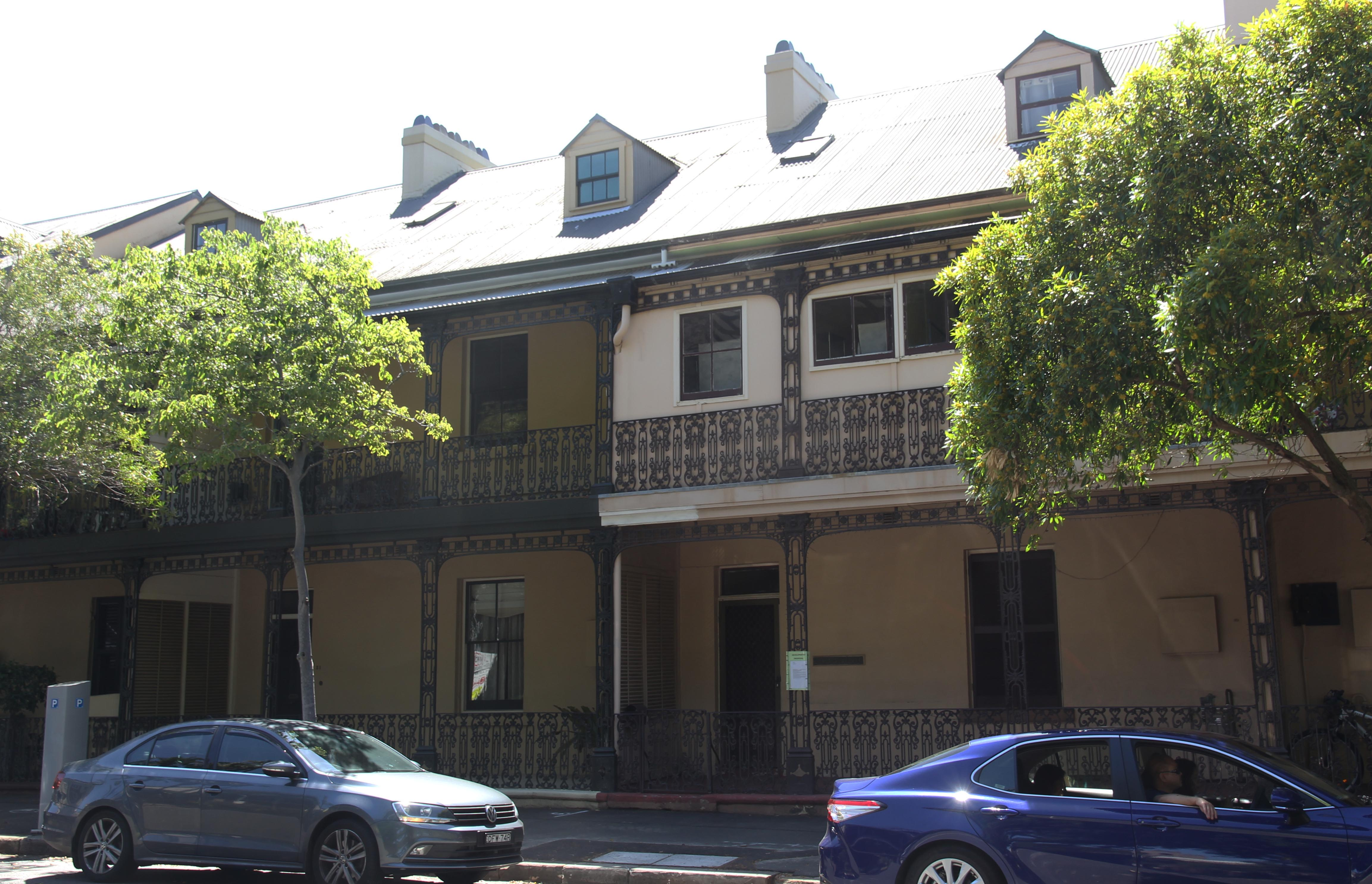
Nos. 29 and 31 Lower Fort Street, pictured in 2019

Each house is a two-storey, five bedroom Georgian style terrace house with basement and attic. Elegant iron lace and balcony supports, plus infilled balcony. Storeys: Two; Construction: Painted rendered masonry walls. Corrugated iron roof to main body of house and balcony. Timber and cast iron balcony. Style: Victorian Georgian.

All the buildings in this group are four storeys high, with one storey below Lower Fort Street and one within the roof space. The main buildings appear to date from the early to mid 19th century. Lower ground floor main walls are of stone, and main walls above this level are generally brick, rendered and painted externally at the front and painted only at the rear. Roofs are corrugated iron, painted, with evidence of close battening for shingles beneath. Front verandahs have painted cast and wrought iron lace columns, balustrades and friezes, with timber beams and floors. At the front edge of the verandah floors, there is evidence of seatings for earlier timber posts that supported the original single-storey verandah.

There are generally two principal rooms per floor on the lower ground, ground and first floors, with a stair beside the rear (western) room on each floor. Ground floors and above are of timber, while the lower ground floors are mainly stone, concrete or earth. Internal masonry walls are mostly plastered and painted. Original partition walls and ceilings are of lath-and-plaster, although these have been replaced in part with a variety of later materials including hardboard, plasterboard and fibre cement. Doors and windows are timber, mostly painted internally and externally. The front ground floor windows have a sliding top sash with no counterweights, but hinged timber flaps at the sides to stop the window half open. The bottom sashes are hung on cords and weights. This system was evidently used also for the rear windows on the ground floor that were subsequently converted to door openings, as the reveals show only a single pair of pulleys. Most front window frames have pockets where shutter hinges were formerly fixed. At the rear of the buildings, on lower ground level, are outbuildings containing bathrooms and laundries that are of face brick with concrete floors and timber framed roofs, windows and doors, and have galvanised steel roofs. These appear to date from the early 20th century.

The external condition of the property is good.

=== Modifications and dates ===
External: Dormers removed. Balcony infilled. Joinery changed to balcony beams.

== Heritage listing ==
As at 12 January 2004, this group of terraces is historically significant as:

- the oldest extant terrace in Millers Point;
- an example of investment in residential property in Lower Fort Street during the early 1830s by a local publican for rent and as his own residence;
- its site and buildings were associated from the early 1820s with some of the earliest wharfage (early 1820s) at Millers Point owned by early merchants William Brown, T. G. Pittman and John Lamb;
- part of the historic building stock associated with the local community;
- it has the potential to contribute to an understanding of several phases of the development of Millers Point.

It has high aesthetic significance as:

- an example of early Victorian terraces.
- as a streetscape element, being part of the extraordinary collection of 19th century housing forms that make up the western side of Lower Fort Street.

This property is a group of two storey early nineteenth century terraces. It is part of the Millers Point Conservation Area, an intact residential and maritime precinct. It contains residential buildings and civic spaces dating from the 1830s and is an important example of 19th century adaptation of the landscape.

The house at 29 Lower Fort Street was built with its neighbours at Nos. 25-27 and Nos. 31-33 Lower Fort Street between 1833 and 1834. The present Nos. 25 and 27 were originally a single house for George Morris, for whom the group (first known as Morris Place) was constructed. Morris departed for London in 1836, and his house was shortly afterwards subdivided into two separate dwellings. In 1868, following the death of Morris's widow, the group was sold to John Linsley. It became known as Linsley Terrace in 1873, probably about the time that the original single storey verandahs were replaced by the present two storey structures, with corresponding alterations to doors and windows. The properties were resumed by the Sydney Harbour Trust in 1900, and have been in Government ownership ever since. Between 1916 and 1918 the back yards of the group were curtailed and new outbuildings were added in conjunction with the construction of Hickson Road and the Walsh Bay wharves. The buildings were transferred to the NSW Housing Commission (later the NSW Department of Housing and subsequently the NSW Land and Housing Corporation) between 1983 and 1986. From 2008, a number of the properties were offered for long lease to the private sector, and Nos. 31 and 33 were leased and subsequently adapted as single family residences.

The terrace at 25–33 Lower Fort Street is of State historic significance as the earliest extant terrace in Millers Point. It is an early example of investment in residential property and demonstrates a pattern of development (a house for the owner combined with a number of attached terrace dwellings to generate income) that was to become common in Millers Point and elsewhere in Sydney. The site also has associations with some of the earliest wharfage at Millers Point (early 1820s) owned by early merchants William Brown, T. G. Pitman and John Lamb. The houses are an integral part of Millers Point, the earliest residential precinct in Australia still in residential use today, which is of State and arguably national significance. They form an important visual component of this precinct, being highly visible from the water to both east and west, as well as from Hickson Road at the rear and at the termination of George Street north at the front. The buildings have high research potential, as they contain a considerable amount of fabric from the 1830s as well as from subsequent periods of construction, which is able to yield information on the design, construction and use of these buildings. All of the houses, including No. 29, have high local social significance through their long relationship with the close-knit Millers Point community.

Linsley Terrace was listed on the New South Wales State Heritage Register on 2 April 1999 having satisfied the following criteria.

The place is important in demonstrating the course, or pattern, of cultural or natural history in New South Wales.

The houses at 25–33 Lower Fort Street, built in 1833–34, are the oldest extant terrace group in Millers Point, and demonstrate a pattern of development (a group of three or more houses including one more elaborate, built for the owner) that was to become typical. The only older group of buildings in Millers Point is the pair of houses at 21–23 Lower Fort Street, built 1832–34. These houses are associated with the first phase of residential development of the Millers Point area. The buildings have been used for housing continuously since they were built.

The place has a strong or special association with a person, or group of persons, of importance of cultural or natural history of New South Wales's history.

These buildings are associated with two prominent businessmen of early Sydney, George Morris and John Linsley, who successively gave their name to the group. They are also associated with the earliest wharfage in Millers Point, and the early merchants that owned it. Morris Place is typical of the significant role played by publicans in property development in 19th century Sydney. The buildings are also associated with the Sydney Harbour Trust and its successors that have owned and managed the place since 1900.

The place is important in demonstrating aesthetic characteristics and/or a high degree of creative or technical achievement in New South Wales.

The terrace exhibits high levels of building craftsmanship, especially in the joinery of the former Morris house at 25–27 Lower Fort Street. The louvred partitions between front verandahs are rare items of their kind. The terrace is part of the distinctive streetscape of Millers Point, and is located at the termination of George Street.

The place has a strong or special association with a particular community or cultural group in New South Wales for social, cultural or spiritual reasons.

This terrace has been home to successive generations of the Millers Point community. The terrace has been part of the physical fabric of Millers Point since the 1830s.

The place has potential to yield information that will contribute to an understanding of the cultural or natural history of New South Wales.

As the houses have been present on the site since the 1830s, and retain much of their original fabric, they have considerable potential to yield information on early life in Sydney as well as on the changes in building use and construction that have occurred since the 1830s.

The place possesses uncommon, rare or endangered aspects of the cultural or natural history of New South Wales.

The terrace is historically rare as the earliest terrace group surviving in Millers Point, and part of the earliest phase of residential construction.

The place is important in demonstrating the principal characteristics of a class of cultural or natural places/environments in New South Wales.

The terraces show design and constructional attributes that are fine examples of 19th century development in Millers Point. The terrace is an early example of a pattern of development that was to become typical in Millers Point and elsewhere: progressive terrace development by an owner-occupier, with the building intended for the owner's residence being of superior construction and finish to the others.

== See also ==
- Australian residential architectural styles
