= 39–41 Lower Fort Street =

39–41 Lower Fort Street, Millers Point
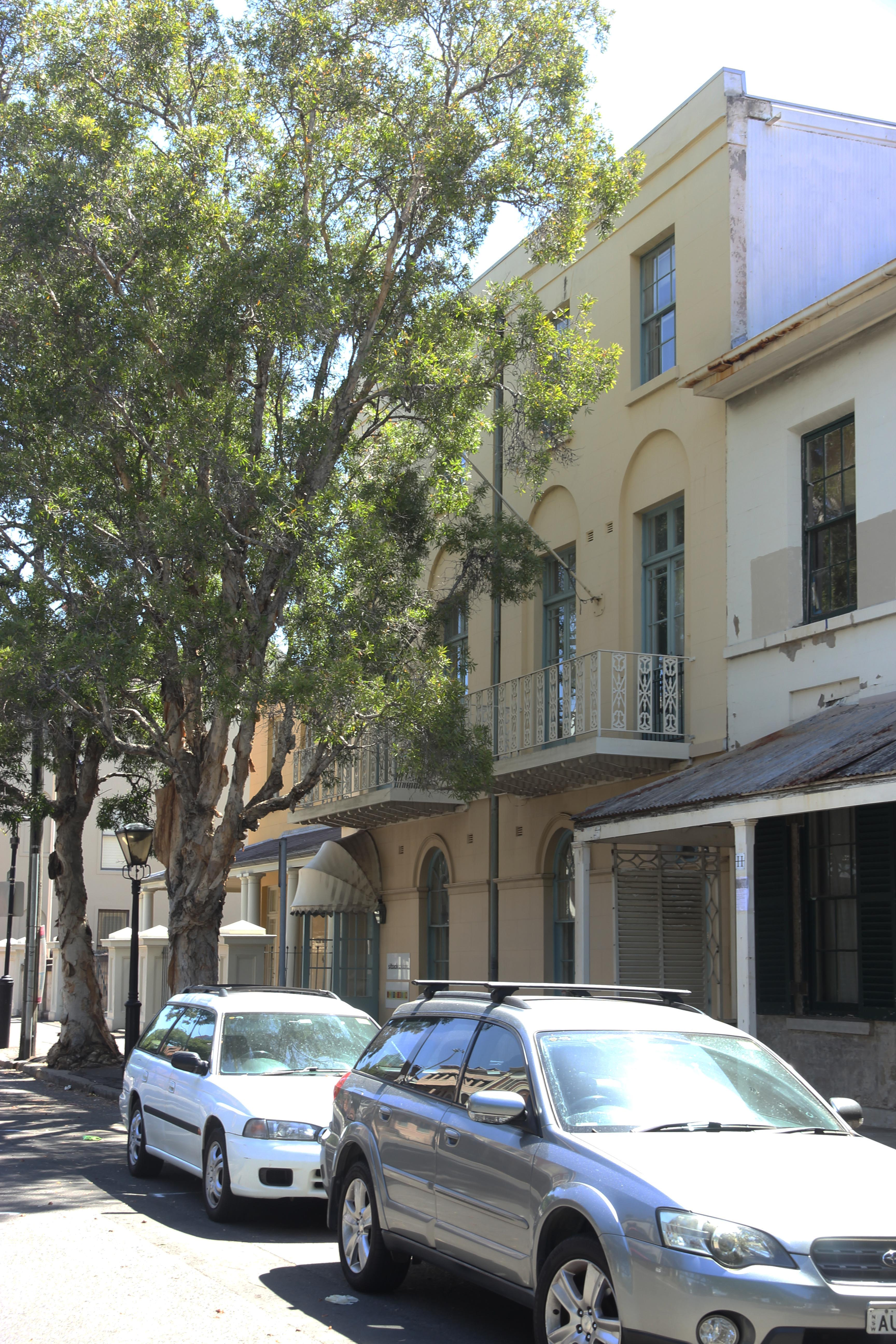
- 39–41 Lower Fort Street, at left, pictured in 2019

- Location within Sydney Location within Australia
- 33°51′23″S 151°12′26″E
- Location: 39–41 Lower Fort Street, Millers Point, City of Sydney, New South Wales, Australia

Site notes
- Architectural style: Victorian Georgian

New South Wales Heritage Register
- Official name: Georgian Townhouse; Terrace
- Type: State heritage (built)
- Designated: 2 April 1999
- Reference no.: 523
- Type: Historic site

39–41 Lower Fort Street, Millers Point is a heritage-listed former terrace house and now mixed use located at 39–41 Lower Fort Street, in the inner city Sydney suburb of Millers Point in the City of Sydney local government area of New South Wales, Australia. It is also known as Georgian Townhouse. It was added to the New South Wales State Heritage Register on 2 April 1999.

== Description ==
The building is a terrace house with three storeys and a basement level which is at the level of the lower rear lane.

== Heritage listing ==
39–41 Lower Fort Street, Millers Point was listed on the New South Wales State Heritage Register on 2 April 1999.

== See also ==
- Linsley Terrace, 25–35 Lower Fort Street
- 47–53 Lower Fort Street, Millers Point
