= HomeFund =

HomeFund was a scheme set up by the New South Wales state government and operated through co-operative housing societies that allowed people who would not otherwise be able to afford a home to take out loans that would allow them to purchase a home. The scheme was especially targeted at public housing tenants.

The scheme was originally set up by the Labor Party government of Neville Wran in the mid-1980s. Problems started to emerge when the then-new Coalition government of Nick Greiner raised public housing rents and started to market more aggressively toward public housing tenants, with some people receiving 30-year loans even though they were already aged into their 70s and 80s. Interest rates for the scheme rose to around 15.9%, which was somewhat consistent with what other home loan lenders were charging at the time but out of reach of most HomeFund borrowers, with in many cases repayments not even covering interest.

As a result of this, the scheme was restructured in 1993 with the appointment of a HomeFund commissioner to deal with complaints and a program to either move loans to commercial lenders or cap interest rates.
