= Housing NSW =

Australian agency of the Department of Communities and Justice

Agency overview
- Formed: 11 June 2008 (as Housing NSW); 20 February 1942 (as the Housing Commission of New South Wales); April 1912 (as NSW Housing Board)
- Preceding agencies: New South Wales Department of Housing (1986–2008); Housing Commission of New South Wales (1942–1985); New South Wales Housing Board (1912–1942)
- Type: Government agency
- Jurisdiction: New South Wales
- Headquarters: Sydney
- Minister responsible: Minister for Families and Communities
- Parent department: Department of Communities and Justice
- Key document: Housing Act 2001 (NSW)

Housing NSW, formerly the Housing Commission of New South Wales and before that the New South Wales Housing Board, was an agency of the Department of Communities and Justice that was responsible for the provision and management of public housing services with the aim to prevent homelessness in the state of New South Wales, Australia.

The agency was established pursuant to the Housing Act 2001 (NSW).

== Purpose and function ==
Housing NSW provides a range of services including public and community housing, housing for people of Aboriginal and Torres Strait Islander backgrounds, support services for people with special needs linked to government and non-government agencies, private rental assistance and subsidies, advice and assistance for home-buyers, the development of affordable housing, community regeneration, and development and regulation of social housing policies.

Initially the role of the Housing Commission was to investigate housing affordability and standards, co-ordinate with associated agencies, publish its findings and general information about housing, take steps to improve housing standards and recommend further legislation.

The commission was responsible for the provision of post-war housing in the 1940s and 1950s, often using cheap fibro materials due to shortages of other materials such as bricks. It was also responsible for slum clearance in the 1960s and the replacement of terraced housing in the Waterloo area with high rise public housing towers. In the 1970s, the now-discredited American Radburn style of public housing was used, especially in the south western suburbs of Sydney. Phyllis Le Cappelaine Burke served on the commission for twenty years, from 1945 to 1965, and advocated for policies to improve the lives of women in public housing.

Prior to the establishment of the Housing Commission, a Housing Board was established in April 1912 under the authority of the NSW Colonial Secretary.

== High Rise Developments (6 stories and higher) ==
=== Sites ===
Camperdown

- Johanna O'Dea Court Pyrmont Bridge Road (Corner of Lyons Road), 1 building, next to Homeless accommodation and walk-up flats complex (Y-Shaped)

- Chifley

- Namatjira Place, 3 buildings, walk-up flats complex (I-Shaped)

- Eastlakes

- Rosebery Apartments Maloney Street, (Corner of Leon Lachal Reserve), 2 unit blocks, linked by stairs/elevator block (I-Shaped)
- Eastlakes Apartments Florence Avenue, (Corner of Evans Avenue), 2 unit blocks, walk-up flats complex (I-Shaped)

- Gladesville

- Manning Road, (Corner of Victoria Road), 2 buildings (I-Shaped)\

- Kirribilli

- Greenway, (Greenway Drive), 6 conjoined buildings adjacent to smaller complex (2 L-Shaped, 2 rectangle-shaped, 2 Y-shaped, 1 T-shaped)

- Lilyfield

- Lilyfield Road, (Corner of Grove Street), 1 building adjacent to 2 housing estates and duplex cottages (B-Shaped)

- Newtown

- Station Street, (Corner of Reiby Place) 1 rectangular block
- Forbes Street, (Corner of Elvy Place) 1 building in Golden Grove Housing Complex (P-Shaped)

- North Bondi

- Elanora, (Hardy Street) 1 building (U-Shaped)

- Redfern

- Mckell, Lawson, Gilmore, Kendall Morehead Street, 3 buildings adjacent to housing estate (3 double conjoined rectangular towers, 1 X-Shaped)
- Purcell, (1 I-shaped Block)

- Riverwood

- Lincoln, Jefferson adjacent to large housing estate (2 triple conjoined square-shaped towers)

- Surry Hills

- John Northcott Place, two buildings, surrounded by walk-up complex (3 rectangular blocks conjoined with Y-shaped tower, 1 I-shaped surrounded by walk-ups)

- Telopea

- Sturt Street (Corner of Wade Street), adjacent to large housing estate (3 square-shaped towers)

- The Rocks

- Sirius Building, 1 building adjacent to large housing estate, (/-shaped) (Sold to Private Developers)

- Waterloo

- Cook, Matavai, Turanga, Solander, Marton and Banks, adjacent to large housing estate, 6 buildings (4 I-shaped, 2 rectangle-shaped)
- Pitt Street (Corner of Kellick Street), 2 buildings (U-shaped)

== See also ==
- List of New South Wales government agencies
- Public housing in Australia
- HomeFund, a government home loan scheme targeted at public housing tenants
