= Millers Point Conservation Area =

- Location within Sydney Location within Australia
- 33.8578°S 151.2045°E
- Location: Millers Point, Sydney, City of Sydney, New South Wales, Australia

Site notes
- Owner: NSW Land and Housing Corporation

New South Wales Heritage Register
- Official name: Millers Point Conservation Area
- Type: state heritage (conservation area)
- Designated: 2 April 1999
- Reference no.: 884
- Type: Townscape
- Category: Urban Area

Millers Point Conservation Area is a heritage-listed historic precinct at Millers Point, Sydney, City of Sydney, New South Wales, Australia. The property is owned by the New South Wales Land and Housing Corporation. It was added to the New South Wales State Heritage Register on 2 April 1999.

== History ==
=== Aboriginal occupation ===
Prior to European settlement the Millers Point area was part of the wider Gadigal territory, in which the clan fished, hunted and gathered shellfish from the nearby mudflats. Shellfish residue was deposited in middens, in the area known to the early Europeans as Cockle Bay; the middens were later used by the Europeans in lime kilns for building purposes. The Millers Point area was known to the Cadigal as Coodye, and Dawes Point as Tar-ra/Tarra.

In the years following European colonisation of the eastern coast of Australia, the Cadigal population, as among the wider Indigenous community, was devastated by the introduction of diseases such as smallpox. Remnants of the original Port Jackson clans eventually banded together for survival purposes, but the population continued to decline, exacerbated by alienation from their land and food sources, and by acts of aggression and retaliation, caused partly through cultural misunderstanding and partly through eighteenth-century European mindsets and perceptions about the colonisation process.

=== Initial European settlement ===
The first settlers at Sydney Cove in 1788 were hampered from thorough exploration of the Millers Point area by reasons of topography: to reach this western ridged area involved either trekking around the foreshore via Dawes Point, or by scaling the steep and rocky inclines of The Rocks. Priority was given to establishing the colony's first structures, and the settlers' interests were initially geared more towards temporary housing and a ready supply of fresh water (via the Tank Stream) than in conquering challenging topography. In July 1788 the high ground to the west of Sydney Cove saw the erection of a flagstaff, giving rise to its early name of Flagstaff Hill, later Observatory Hill.

The earliest buildings in the Millers Point area were intended to serve specific purposes, either for strategic military or agricultural needs. The first government windmill was built on the site in February 1797, supplying the origin of the third name of Windmill Hill. Subsequent windmills were established in 1812 by Nathaniel Lucas at Dawes Point, and a further three windmills operated by Jack "the Miller" Leighton were situated in Millers Point, near the sites of present-day Bettington and Merriman Streets. Throughout this early period Jack the Miller became increasingly associated with the area, ultimately contributing to its name.

For military purposes, Governor King authorised the construction of Fort Phillip in 1804, a short-lived structure with hexagonal foundations that were eventually re-used in 1858 for the footprint of the extant Observatory. Fort Phillip had been designed for both internal and external defence mechanisms as it boasted both landward and seaward views. In 1815, a military hospital designed by Lieutenant John Watts was constructed near to Flagstaff Hill and Fort Phillip. Catering for both military and scientific demands was the Point Maskelyne observatory, built by William Dawes at the end of the point: immediately adjacent to his beloved observatory was the Dawes Battery, initially set up in 1788 and upgraded in 1791 whilst under Dawes' administration.

=== Economic and maritime development ===
These initial structures were rapidly supplemented by dwellings and early industries. One profitable industry that exploited local resources was the production of stone for the construction of housing and services in early Sydney: sections of Millers Point were known as "The Quarries", near Kent and the western end of Windmill Streets. Quarrying was an established industry by the mid 1820s, and this process of systematically altering the landscape continued as a pattern throughout the century, ultimately shaping the emerging village and directing the development of the local streetscape and housing pattern. A second local industry was lime production, used in building construction and carried out just below Fort Phillip using shells acquired from local aboriginal middens. As this supply diminished, shellfish was brought from the wider Sydney area to be burnt at Millers Point.

The location of Millers Point, with its relationship to the waterfront, was ideally suited for shipping purposes, and merchants tapped in to its potential by erecting private jetties, wharves and storage for goods. The village of Millers Point became a definitive one in the early 1830s, as maritime and other related enterprises began to radiate outwards from Sydney Cove, bringing with it residential and commercial facilities. Access to Millers Point was gained through a set of rough-cut steps leading through from the Rocks. Those who chose to live in the area comprised both the successful wharf-owners and employees, labourers and artisans. Ownership of Millers Point land was by haphazard means; while some was documented as granted land, other parcels appeared to have been simply "occupied" and by the mid 1830s administration, ownership and transfer of land was problematic and from the late 1830s a Commissioner of Claims was responsible for issuing land grants for most of Millers Point.

The village quickly became an integral part in coastal and international trade and shipping, shipbuilding and similar related activities. The incorporation of such commercial and mercantilist elements was both indicative of, and contributory to the public perception and nature of Millers Point, with a roll-on effect throughout the nineteenth and twentieth centuries. Growing colonial interest in whaling and maritime enterprises fostered local prosperity during the 1830s and 1840s. From this period Millers Point became irrevocably associated with maritime industries and activities, with merchants, sailors and craftsmen putting a distinctive stamp on the area. The success of such mercantilist ventures and associated industries became evident in both commercial and residential architecture, constructed for merchants such as Robert Towns and Robert Campbell. Sections of Millers Point became regarded as affluent enclaves, with Argyle and Lower Fort Streets known as "Quality Row".

The close association with shipping and related patterns of activity and industry was derived from the labourers' need to be at hand upon arrival of vessels. Valuable goods such as wool had to be loaded and unloaded at a rapid rate of turnover, with labourers required to be on call and, as such, in the nearby vicinity to respond to erratic shipping arrivals and departures. An important outcome of this trade activity was the generation of a community that was overwhelmingly mobile, maintaining relatively loose family networks and containing a high transient population. These key characteristics of Millers Point distinguished it from other areas, and its unusual composition was reflected by the high level of rental housing, which in most other suburbs was an indicator of poverty and unskilled workforces. In this instance, however, the rental rates were generated by the need for flexibility and seasonal job availability on the part of workers.

Despite high mobility on the part of the population, Millers Point was able to act as a self-contained village from the 1840s; this characteristic was enhanced by its continuing topographical isolation from the town of Sydney. It was an early multicultural community with sailors and merchants from all parts of the world. Local amenities catered for shopping, work and socialising as well as the provision of churches, schools and other essential services. The Catholic St Brigid's Church and school in Kent Street was completed in 1835, with the foundation stone of the Anglican Holy Trinity, or Garrison Church, laid in 1840 at the corner of Argyle and Lower Fort Streets. The latter became particularly associated with the Dawes Battery military garrison but also served as a base for school and moral education and a forum for community gatherings in accordance with the accepted role of churches in the colony. Other centres equally if not more popular for social gatherings were the host of hotels and licensed premises that catered for a range of clientele. Some, such as the Lord Nelson Hotel and the Hero of Waterloo Hotel, became local institutions and remained active in the community to the present day. A myriad of hotels, often sporting similar or frequently-changing names, provided local colour and an insight into current affairs and fads but inevitably adding to the confusion. Many of these early hotel buildings are extant, such as the Whalers Arms (former Young Princess), on Lower Fort and Windmill Streets, and such structures stand as testimony to the fact that by the mid-century the Millers Point hotels were an integral part of both the social and economic roles of the area.

The sense of segregation and self-sufficiency began to be eroded through proposals to incorporate Millers Point with the rest of Sydney. Plans to facilitate greater access to the Millers Point area dated from 1832, with the first suggestion of cutting through the "precipice of considerable height" on Argyle Street. To that point, rough steps had originally been cut into the rock, to allow passage between the Rocks and Millers Point. The Argyle Cut project commenced in 1843 using convict labour initially, and was completed through the resources of the newly formed Sydney City Council from about 1845. The sandstone itself was used in the construction of local buildings, as was the case with the Hero of Waterloo Hotel. In spite of this increased accessibility, the unique character of Millers Point was undiminished. Certainly by the mid-point of the nineteenth century a gradual overlaying of cultural features had evolved into a flourishing and distinct community, with various church denominations, a wide range of commercial and social services, and in 1850, the Fort Street Model School was opened, having been the original military hospital constructed in 1815 and renovated to architect Mortimer Lewis' design in 1849. This clearly earmarked Millers Point as a prosperous area, and presaged the modern practice of adapting old buildings in the area to accommodate new uses.

Local prosperity was briefly thrown into a trough following the allure of the Californian gold fields, with employers hard-pressed to find enough experienced workers at the right price. This trend, however, was abruptly reversed within a short space of time. Indeed, the pace of the Millers Point community accelerated rapidly in the 1850s to accommodate the frenzy generated by the discovery of gold at Bathurst and the consequent flood of immigrants into New South Wales. This coincided with an increase in large-scale exports, particularly wool, to diverse international markets. By the 1860s the earlier mix of worker and merchant/gentry housing began to be overtaken by commercial needs and by the creation of new residential streetscapes such as Argyle Place and Kent Street, with a distinct change in the size of residential buildings and an increasing use of materials such as slate. The mercantilist face of Millers Point also changed, with the construction and extension of larger jetties and warehouses for imported goods as well as staples such as wool, coal and flour. Gradually this period of upgrading saw the small scale industries and structures superseded by the encroaching larger-scale warehouses, responding to the demand created by larger vessels. A corresponding shift in the population showed that the artisans and merchant gentry were moving elsewhere, and that Millers Point was overwhelmingly oriented towards booming export industries, with a workforce and resident population of unskilled and semi-skilled labourers catering for specific tasks.

The area to the northwest of the City of Sydney was first settled in the early nineteenth century. It has a long history as a port with housing and other community facilities developed in association. The aea shows a cross-section of Australian urban development from the 1810s to 1930s. It was resumed by government in the 1900s and developed as a "company town" by the port authorities.

== Description ==
As an integrated port town developed between the 1810s and the 1930s and little changed since then, it is remarkable for its completeness and intactness. Its components include deep-sea wharves and associated infrastructure, bond and free stores, roadways and accessways, public housing built for port workers, former private merchant housing, hotels and shops, schools, churches, post office and community facilities.

=== Condition ===
As at 17 September 1997, the conservation area was in good condition. It is a complete government port town remarkable for its intactness.

=== Further information ===
All individual heritage listings for Millers Point are an integral part of the whole precinct and are of the same level of State significance as the precinct. The area is generally in New South Wales Government ownership and most individual items are identified in the internal heritage registers of owning authorities (mainly Department of Housing). All properties sold to private ownership are protected by State Heritage Register listings; however, recent practice has been to retain state ownership and sell leasehold only. The Millers Point Conservation Area as defined in the City of Sydney Local Environment Plan 1992 does not include the Walsh Bay precinct which is covered by a Regional Environmental Plan. However, from a heritage perspective, Millers Point and Walsh Bay Wharves Precinct are integral. The Millers Point Conservation Area was endorsed as an item of state and national significance by the Heritage Council on 15 December 1988.

== Heritage listing ==
As at 29 October 2001, Millers Point Conservation Area is an intact residential and maritime precinct of outstanding state and national significance. It contains buildings and civic spaces dating from the 1830s and is an important example of nineteenth and early twentieth century adaptation of the landscape. The precinct has changed little since the 1930s.

Millers Point Conservation Area was listed on the New South Wales State Heritage Register on 2 April 1999 having satisfied the following criteria.

The place is important in demonstrating the course, or pattern, of cultural or natural history in New South Wales.

Significant in the evolution and pattern of the history of New South Wales.

Miller's Point provides a geographically encapsulated portrayal of the evolution of Australian urban life prior to the mid twentieth century. It demonstrates a complex layering of activities and events, ranging from early colonial merchant and official enterprise to twentieth century corporate port town and setting for social planning. Its demonstrative capacity is heightened by the completeness and originality of its fabric which represents particularly strongly every decade between 1820 and 1930 and by the experiences and memory of its long term community. Its public housing and its development into a Government corporate town were probably the first such developments in Australia (apart from first settlement) and may be of international significance. It features virtually intact residential areas, port and stevedoring works created by the Sydney Harbour Trust, 1900 1930, in response to the Sydney plague and the requirements of maritime trade at that time. Its associations include personalities encompassing a wide spectrum of New South Wales society:

- early millers such as John Leighton, the original "Jack the Miller"
- colonial merchant class, represented by the Campbell family of Bligh House, 43 Lower Fort Street;
- later merchant class who invested in major warehouses (Robert Towns and Parbury)
- prominent Sydney citizens of the mid nineteenth century such as John Fairfax of the Sydney Morning Herald who enjoyed the proximity to the town. (The relatively modest scale of the houses at Miller's Point, and the relative importance of its pre 1870 inhabitants reflects the economic circumstances and the aspirations of the citizens of the town of Sydney.)
- 1880s property investors who built substantial rows of terrace houses of which 1–19 Lower Fort Street is the finest in Millers Point, and the grandest surviving terrace in New South Wales;
- publicans, as key civic figures, for example, the Armstrong family of the Palisade Hotel
- the Irish community, as a major social group, the men generally employed as waterside workers
- nineteenth century street life : urchins, larrikins and prostitutes, colouring the otherwise respectable nature of the district pre 1900
- significant architects and their work
  - Henry Ginn & Edmund Blacket : Holy Trinity Church (Garrison Church)
  - Walter Liberty Vernon : Post Office
  - Alexander Dawson: Observatory
  - J. Watts and M. Lewis : Fort Street School (also H. Robertson)
  - M. Lewis : Richmond Villa, Kent Street (moved from Domain c.1975)
  - J. Verge : 39–41 Lower Fort Street
  - G. McRae : 1910s workers' housing
  - V. Parkes : proposals c.1910 to Sydney Redevelopment Advisory Board for new hygienic tenements between Argyle Place and Windmill Street
  - W. Wardell : Grafton Bond Store
- significant engineers and their work:
  - H.D. Walsh : Walsh Bay Port structures and works
  - N. Selfe : advice on new wharf facilities c.1910
- significant maritime figures: John Irving (boat builder), James Munn (ship builder), John Cuthbert (Cuthbert's Patent Slip)
- members of the Sydney Harbour Trust Board
- artists, and the discovery of the pictorial qualities of Australia including urban squalor, waterfront incident and the harbour bridge
  - Prout and Rae 1840s in Sydney Illustrated
  - S. Elyard 1860s
  - Lindsay family c.1900
  - W. Hardy Wilson c.1910
  - Cazneaux c.1920
  - Dorrit Black c.1930

The place is important in demonstrating aesthetic characteristics and/or a high degree of creative or technical achievement in New South Wales.

Significant in possessing, or contributing to, creative or technical accomplishment in New South Wales. It demonstrates technical and creative excellence of the period 1820 1930, including wharfage, warehousing, civic facilities and landscaping, the observatory, hotels, public housing and its support facilities, colonial housing and the Garrison Church buildings. It documents the workings of a technologically advanced early twentieth century shipping port, developed specifically to accommodate new mechanised transportation technology (engine driven vessels and motor lorries), and strongly retains and demonstrates the physical character of a port. It demonstrates characteristic dramatic harbourside topography, human modified and used in strata for relevant functions (Observatory, fortifications, elevated housing for the colonial gentry, multi level warehousing/wharfage and deepwater berthing). It is unified as an area in materials, form and scale and is clearly defined by the Harbour Bridge and Bradfield Highway, Walsh Bay and Darling Harbour.

The place has a strong or special association with a particular community or cultural group in New South Wales for social, cultural or spiritual reasons.

Significant through associations with a community in New South Wales for social, cultural or spiritual reasons. It is occupied in part by descendants of its earlier communities and retains a strong community spirit. It demonstrates, with relatively minor change to its physical character and the social composition of its population, the life of inner Sydney in the early twentieth century. Following its resumption in 1900 it became the setting for a pioneer programme of public housing and social improvement, demonstrated by development of a company port town by the Sydney Harbour Trust. This encompassed construction of purpose designed workers' housing and support services and improvement of existing buildings and services. It remains predominantly a public housing area and retains the presence and activity of the port authority. It retains largely working evidence of early social improvement through education (Lance Kindergarten, St. Brigid's school and the Fort Street schools). It contains institutions strongly associated with the religious life of the community:

- Holy Trinity Church, the church of the Anglican establishment and the military garrison
- St. Brigid's church and school, the oldest extant Catholic establishment in Australia and a focal point of the local Irish working class community

The place has potential to yield information that will contribute to an understanding of the cultural or natural history of New South Wales.

Significant for the potential to yield information contributing to an understanding of the history of New South Wales. Its long term residents provide a rich resource of oral evidence contributing to an understanding of the history of the place and the Sydney waterfront. Its layered fabric, both in terms of structures and archaeology, has had relatively little disturbance since intervention by the Sydney Harbour Trust and has the potential to provide valuable evidence about the place and its community.

The place possesses uncommon, rare or endangered aspects of the cultural or natural history of New South Wales.

Significant in possessing rare, endangered or uncommon aspects of the history of New South Wales. Its unity, authenticity of fabric and community, and complexity of significant activities and events make it probably the rarest and most significant historic urban place in Australia. Its Walsh Bay wharves and associated port structures are unique in Australia and, when associated with the whole port-town, may be of international significance. It contains rare examples of early colonial architecture, of which the Sydney Observatory may be unique.

The place is important in demonstrating the principal characteristics of a class of cultural or natural places/environments in New South Wales.

Significant in demonstrating the characteristics of a class of cultural places or environments in New South Wales. It contains good examples demonstrating the evolution of domestic and commercial buildings in Australia, including a comprehensive illustration of Australian terrace-house development, from "the Ark" (1820s) to Edwardian terraces (1910s). Its individual components illustrate in detail the various characteristics and phases of development of the place.
