= 28 Lower Fort Street, Millers Point =

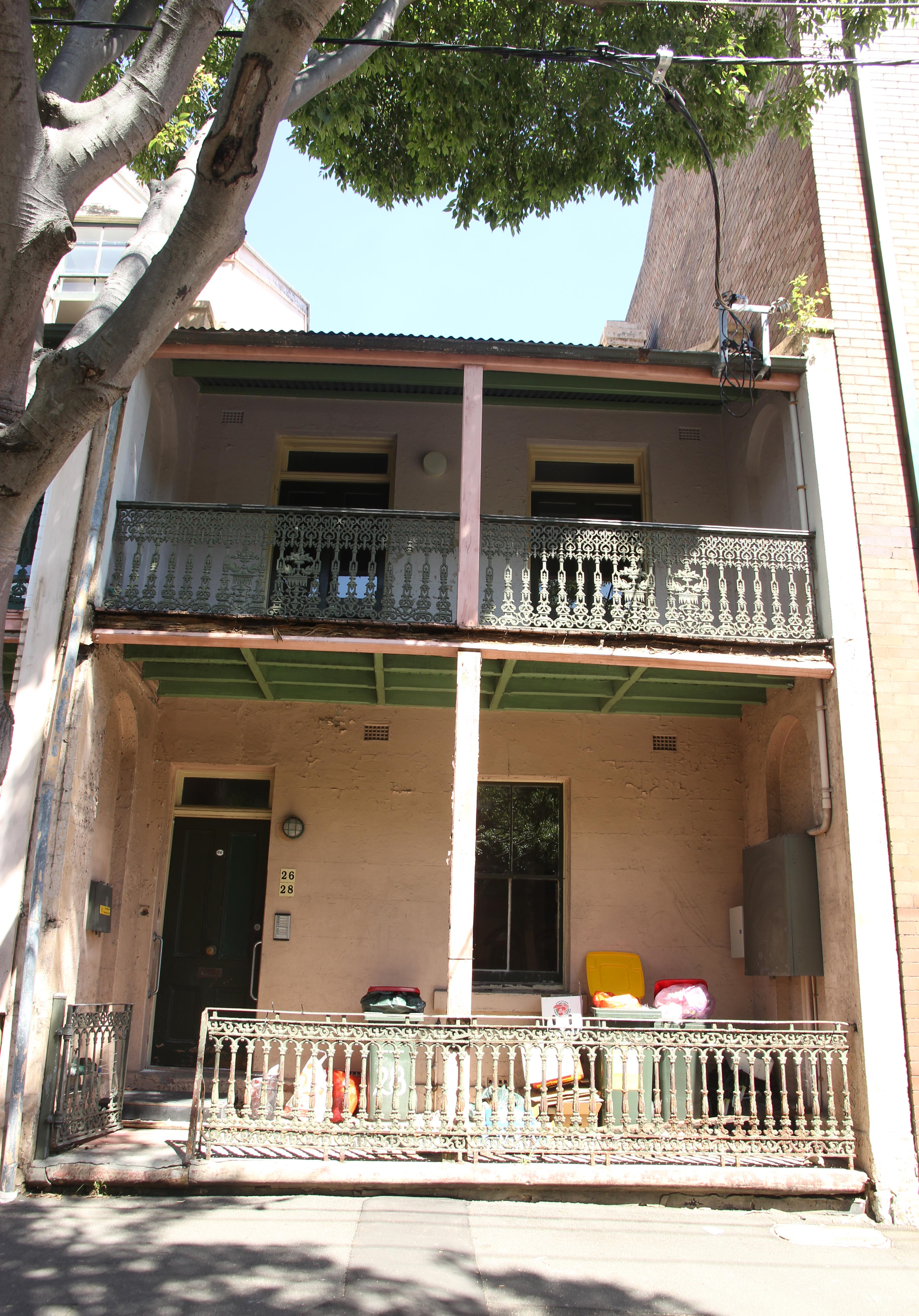
- 26–28 Lower Fort Street, pictured in 2019.

- Location within Sydney Location within Australia
- 33.8570°S 151.2071°E
- Location: 28 Lower Fort Street, Millers Point, City of Sydney, New South Wales, Australia

History
- Built: c. 1860

Site notes
- Architectural style: Victorian Regency

New South Wales Heritage Register
- Official name: Townhouse
- Type: State heritage (built)
- Designated: 2 April 1999
- Reference no.: 881
- Type: Historic site

28 Lower Fort Street, Millers Point is a heritage-listed former residence and now boarding house at 28 Lower Fort Street, in the inner city Sydney suburb of Millers Point in the City of Sydney local government area of New South Wales, Australia. The property was added to the New South Wales State Heritage Register on 2 April 1999.

== History ==
Millers Point is one of the earliest areas of European settlement in Australia, and a focus for maritime activities. Early Victorian town house now part of a terrace streetscape. First tenanted by the NSW Department of Housing in 1985.

== Description ==
Two storey Victorian townhouse with cast iron balustrade at ground floor and iron balcony lace. Two french doors open onto second floor balcony. This building is now a seven-room boarding house, including a substantial rear addition and new adjoining building. Storeys: Two; Construction: Painted rendered masonry, corrugated galvanised iron roof, cast iron balustrade at ground floor and iron balcony lace. Style: Victorian Regency.

The external condition of the property is good.

== Heritage listing ==
As at 23 November 2000, this two storey stuccoed Victorian townhouse was built c. 1860.

It is part of the Millers Point Conservation Area, an intact residential and maritime precinct. It contains residential buildings and civic spaces dating from the 1830s and is an important example of 19th century adaptation of the landscape.

28 Lower Fort Street, Millers Point was listed on the New South Wales State Heritage Register on 2 April 1999.

== See also ==
- Australian residential architectural styles
- 24–26 Lower Fort Street
- 30–42 Lower Fort Street
