= 2–4 Trinity Avenue, Millers Point =

2–4 Trinity Avenue, Dawes Point
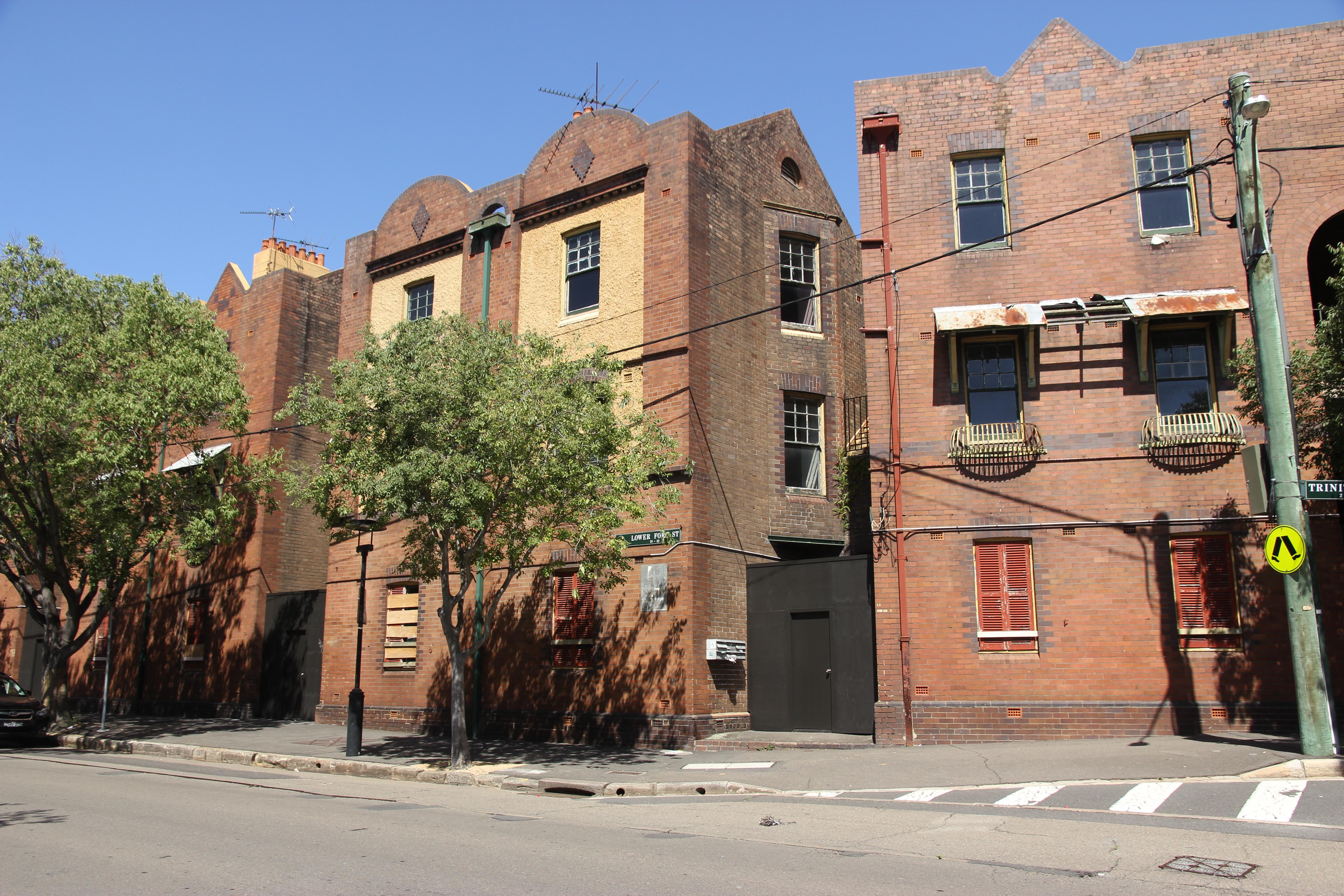
- Disused and boarded up former public housing located at 30–42 Lower Fort Street (left) and 2–4 Trinity Avenue (right), pictured in 2019.

- Location within Sydney Location within Australia
- 33.8574°S 151.2067°E
- Location: 2, 4 Trinity Avenue, Dawes Point, City of Sydney, New South Wales, Australia

History
- Built: c. 1910
- Built for: NSW Department of Housing

Site notes
- Architect: NSW Government Architect
- Architectural style: Federation Arts and Crafts

New South Wales Heritage Register
- Official name: Flats
- Type: State heritage (built)
- Designated: 2 April 1999
- Reference no.: 869
- Type: Historic site

2–4 Trinity Avenue, Dawes Point is a heritage-listed residence at 2–4 Trinity Avenue, in the inner city Sydney suburb of Dawes Point in the City of Sydney local government area of New South Wales, Australia. It was designed by the NSW Government Architect. The property was added to the New South Wales State Heritage Register on 2 April 1999.

== History ==
Millers Point is one of the earliest areas of European settlement in Australia, and a focus for maritime activities. This block of apartments is one of a group built as part of the post-plague redevelopment of the area. First tenanted by the NSW Department of Housing in 1982.

== Description ==
The two-bedroom unit in a block of three storey face brick c. 1910 apartments with restrained detailing. Storeys: three Construction: Face brick, corrugated iron roof and timber bracketed sun hoods. Cast iron balconies. Painted timber windows. Style: Federation Arts and Crafts.

Externally, the unit is in good condition.

=== Modifications and dates ===
External: Shutters altered. Joinery modified.

== Heritage listing ==
As of 23 November 2000, 2–4 Trinity Avenue, Millers Point was one of a group of three storey apartment blocks built c. 1910, which is a fine example of post-plague workers' housing.

It is part of the Millers Point Conservation Area, an intact residential and maritime precinct. It contains residential buildings and civic spaces dating from the 1830s and is an important example of 19th century adaptation of the landscape.

2–4 Trinity Avenue, Millers Point was listed on the New South Wales State Heritage Register on 2 April 1999.

== See also ==
- Australian residential architectural styles
- 30-42 Lower Fort Street
