= Dawes Point =

Suburb of Sydney, Australia

- Suburb
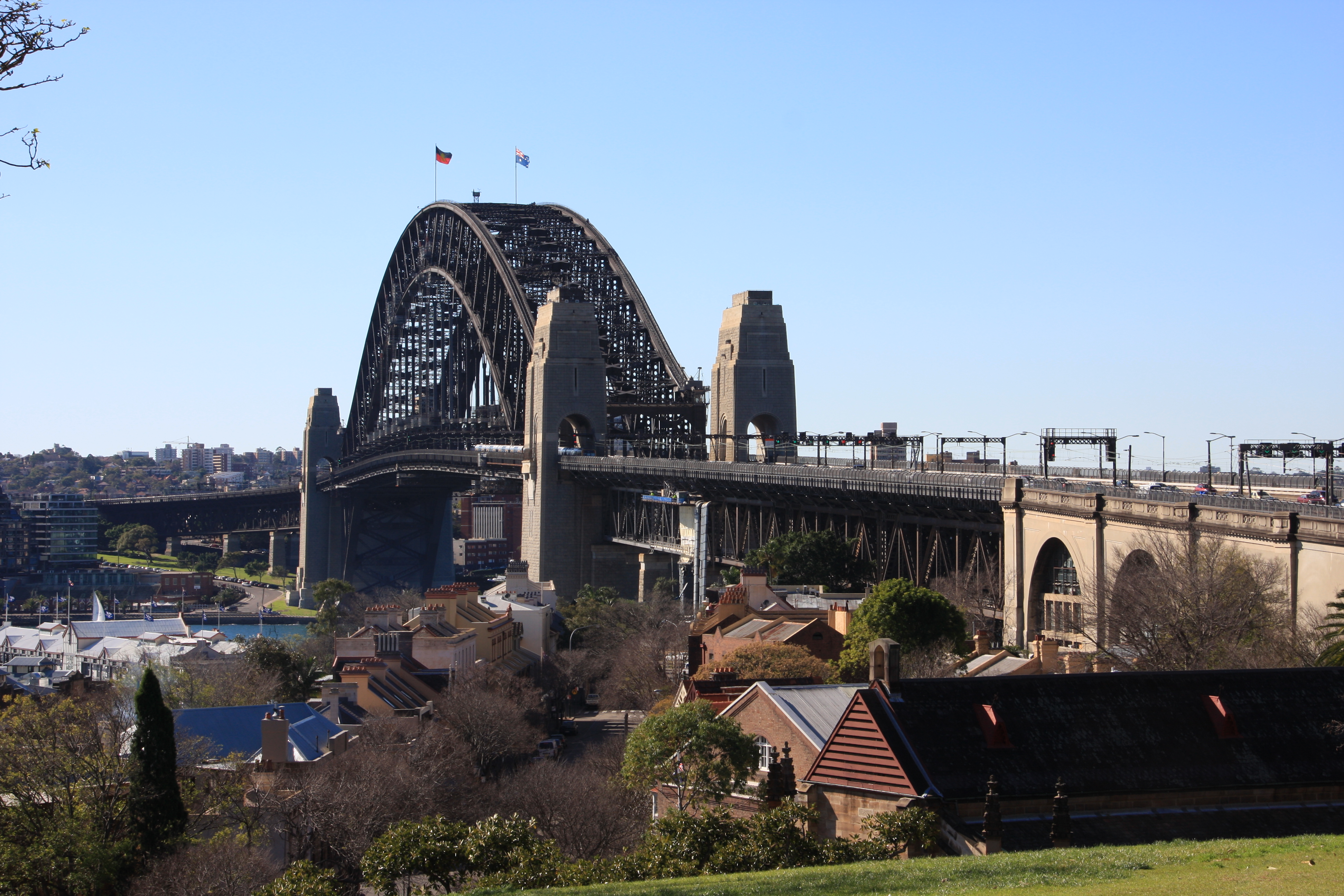
- Sydney Harbour Bridge, viewed from Observatory Hill. 2009

- Interactive map of Dawes Point
- Coordinates: 33°51′22″S 151°12′25″E
- Country: Australia
- State: New South Wales
- City: Sydney
- LGA: City of Sydney
- Location: 1 km (0.62 mi) north of Sydney CBD

Government
  - State electorate: Sydney
  - Federal division: Sydney

Area
  - Total: 0.15 km^{2} (0.058 sq mi)

Population
  - Total: 385 (SAL 2021)
  - Density: 2,541/km^{2} (6,580/sq mi)
- Postcode: 2000
- Parish: St. Philip
Suburbs around Dawes Point
Port Jackson	Kirribilli / Milsons Point	Port Jackson
Port Jackson	Dawes Point	Port Jackson
Millers Point	The Rocks	Sydney Cove

Dawes Point is a suburb of the City of Sydney, in the state of New South Wales, Australia. Dawes Point is located on the north-western edge of the Sydney central business district, at the southern end of Sydney Harbour Bridge, adjacent to The Rocks. Historically, Dawes Point (including Walsh Bay) has been considered to be part of the suburb of Millers Point and the name change is controversial.

== History ==
The suburb of Dawes Point is on Gadigal Country. The point was originally known by the Aboriginal names of Tar-ra and Tullagalla. This was later changed by Governor Hunter at William Dawes' request to Point Maskelyne in honour of his patron Reverend Dr Nevil Maskelyne, British Astronomer Royal. He sent out the first astronomical instruments which were established at the point in the country's first observatory, by Lieutenant William Dawes (1762–1836), astronomer with the First Fleet. The point was renamed in honour of Dawes. Dawes Point is one of the places around Sydney Harbour that has been officially gazetted as a dual named site by the NSW Geographical Names Board. It was officially gazetted Dawes Point / Tar-Ra in 2002.

It was also the site of the first guns mounted in Sydney by Dawes in 1788, contained Sydney's first cemetery and later Dawes Point Battery. Walsh Bay was the site of Sydney's port facilities. The wharves were converted to apartments, theatres, restaurants, cafes and a hotel.

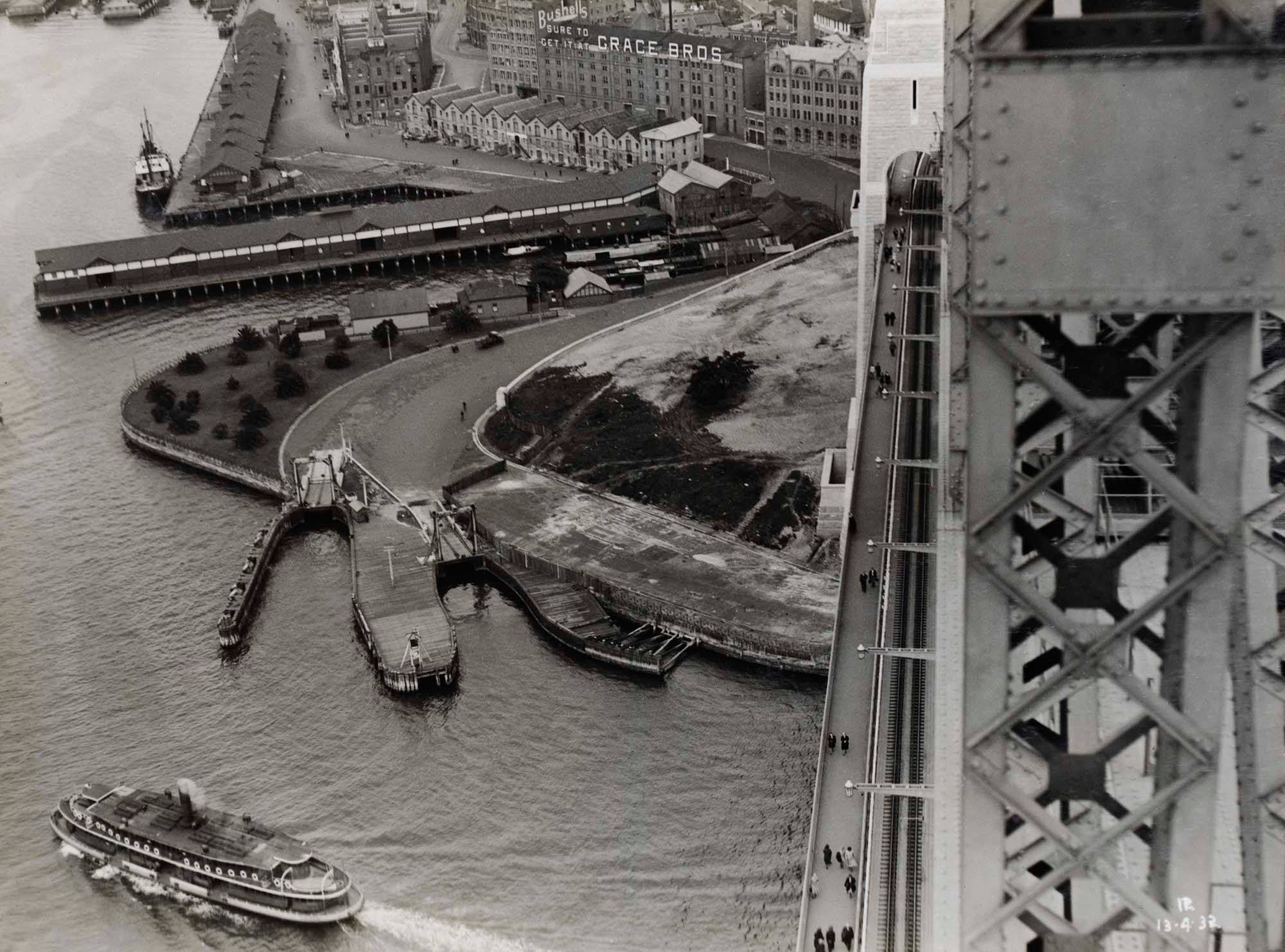
Dawes point reserve is a small section of Dawes Point that juts out onto the eastern side of the Harboour Bridge. The Rocks and Sydney Cove can be seen behind the reserve. This photo has been taken from the Sydney Harbour Bridge shortly after its opening in March 1932

By the 1840s, the people of Dawes Point and Millers Point were a maritime community in which rich and poor mixed more than elsewhere in Sydney. Wharf owners and traders lived and worked beside those who worked on the wharves and bond stores, as well as those who arrived and left on ships. Only two of the merchant houses, built by and for the early wharf owners, survive. One is Walker's 50-foot wide villa built around 1825 and now part of Milton Terrace at 7-9 Lower Fort Street; the other is the home and offices of Edwards and Hunter, built in 1833 above their wharves which is where the Wharf Theatre now stands.

Mostly prosperous in its early years, the area was less desirable by the 1890s. At the beginning of the 20th century, the government compulsorily acquired all private wharves, homes and commercial properties in the Rocks, Dawes Point and Millers Point. Modern and efficient wharves with dual level access were built, as well as new accommodation for workers, such as the Workers Flats of Lower Fort Street designed by Government Architect Vernon. During 2014–18, the majority of the area's social housing was sold and its tenants left the Millers Point area.

== Heritage listings ==
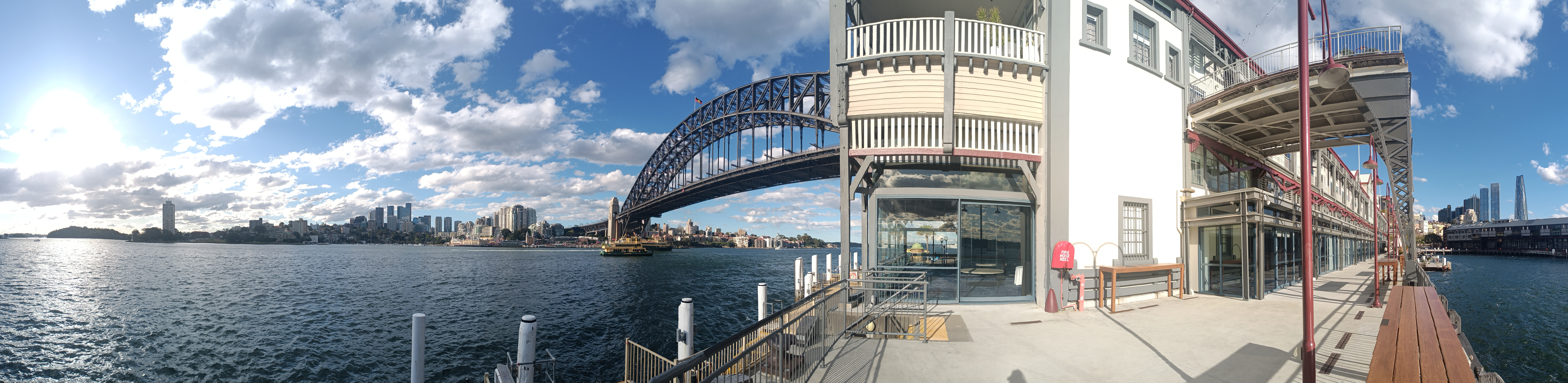
A view of Sydney Harbour from the end of Pier One. Dawes Point, 2025

Dawes Point has a number of heritage-listed sites, including:

- 37 Lower Fort Street: Dawesleigh
- Roslyn Packer Theatre
- Bradfield Highway and North Shore railway: Sydney Harbour Bridge
- 8–12 Trinity Avenue: Darling House c. 1833–1842
- 1–19 Lower Fort Street: Milton Terrace
- 21–23 Lower Fort Street, Millers Point: Nicholson's Cottages
- 25–33 Lower Fort Street: Linsley Terrace
- 35 Lower Fort Street: Major House
- 39–41 Lower Fort Street: John Verge Townhouses
- 43 Lower Fort Street: Bligh House (Clydebank)
- 47–53 Lower Fort Street: Palermo Terrace
- 57–61 Lower Fort Street: Flavelle Terrace
- 63–65 Lower Fort Street
- 69–73 Lower Fort Street
- 75–77 Lower Fort Street
- 79 Lower Fort Street
- 81 Lower Fort Street, The Hero of Waterloo Hotel

== Population ==
At the 2021 census, the population of Dawes Point had increased to 385. 56.9% of people were born in Australia and 76.4% of people only spoke English at home. The most common response for religion was No Religion at 45.7%. Median mortgage payments were $3,467 a month.

In the 2016 census, there were 357 people in Dawes Point. 63.8% of people were born in Australia and 76.2% of people only spoke English at home. The most common response for religion was No Religion at 39.9%.

Median mortgage repayments were $5,200 a month or $62,400 a year, the highest median mortgage repayment in the greater Sydney area.

== Culture ==
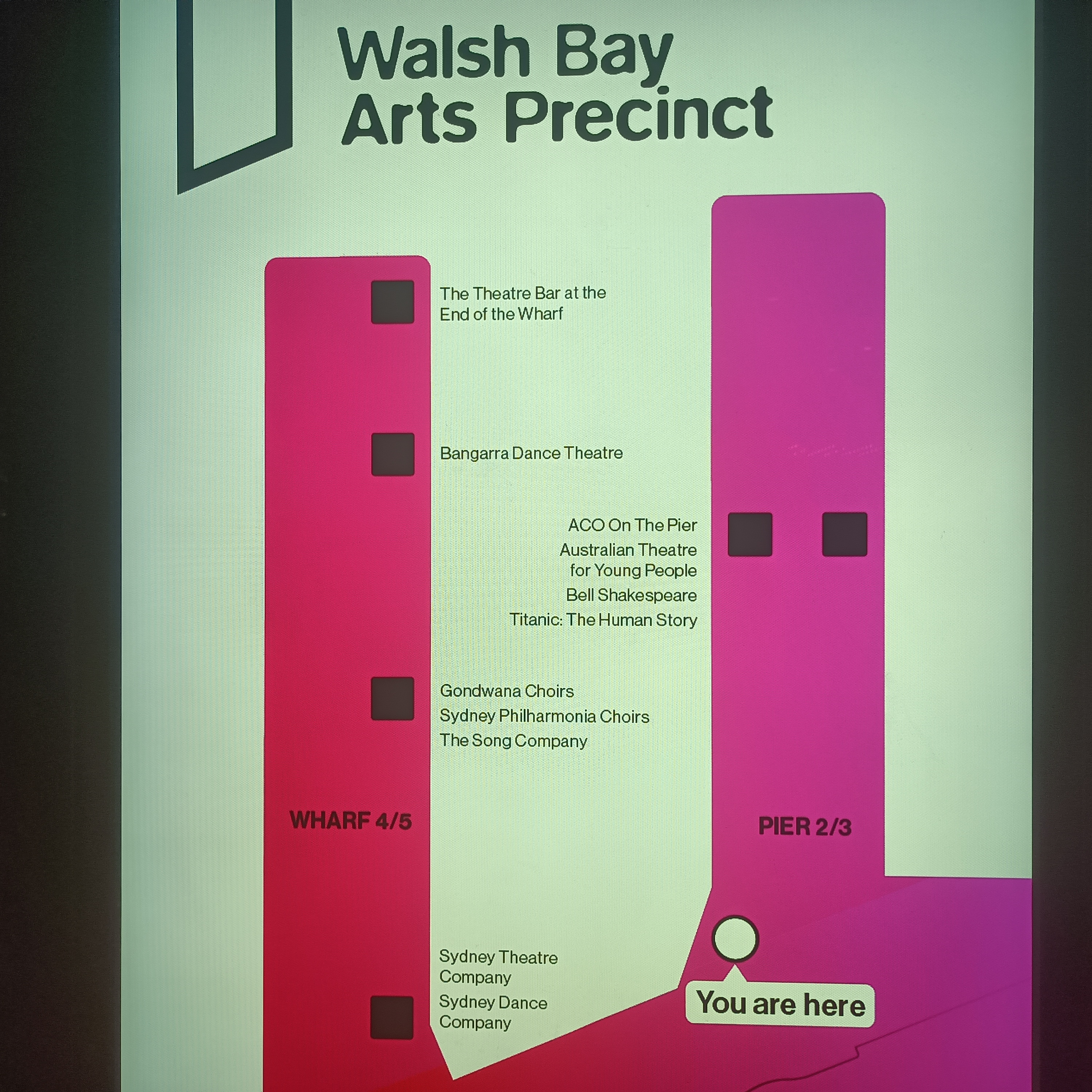
Walsh Bay Arts Precinct, Dawes Point Sydney. 2025

The Wharf Theatres, which are part of the Sydney Theatre Company, are located in Pier 4/5, which is an early 20th-century renovated cargo wharf house that was completed between 1920 and 1921. It is located in the Walsh Bay Wharves Precinct at Dawes Point. There are two theatres that make up the wharf theatres: Wharf theatre 1, which has 339 seats, and Wharf theatre 2, which has 205 seats. There are also five dance studios located in Pier 4/5 that are run by the Sydney Dance Company. These dance studios are used by the Sydney Dance Company to create, rehearse, teach and perform dance in.

The Sydney Theatre Company also operates and makes regular use of the Roslyn Packer Theatre which is located nearby in Millers Point just opposite Pier 6/7. It is a former cargo storage site from the 1830s and it is also used by the Sydney Dance Company and the Sydney Writers Festival.

== Gallery ==
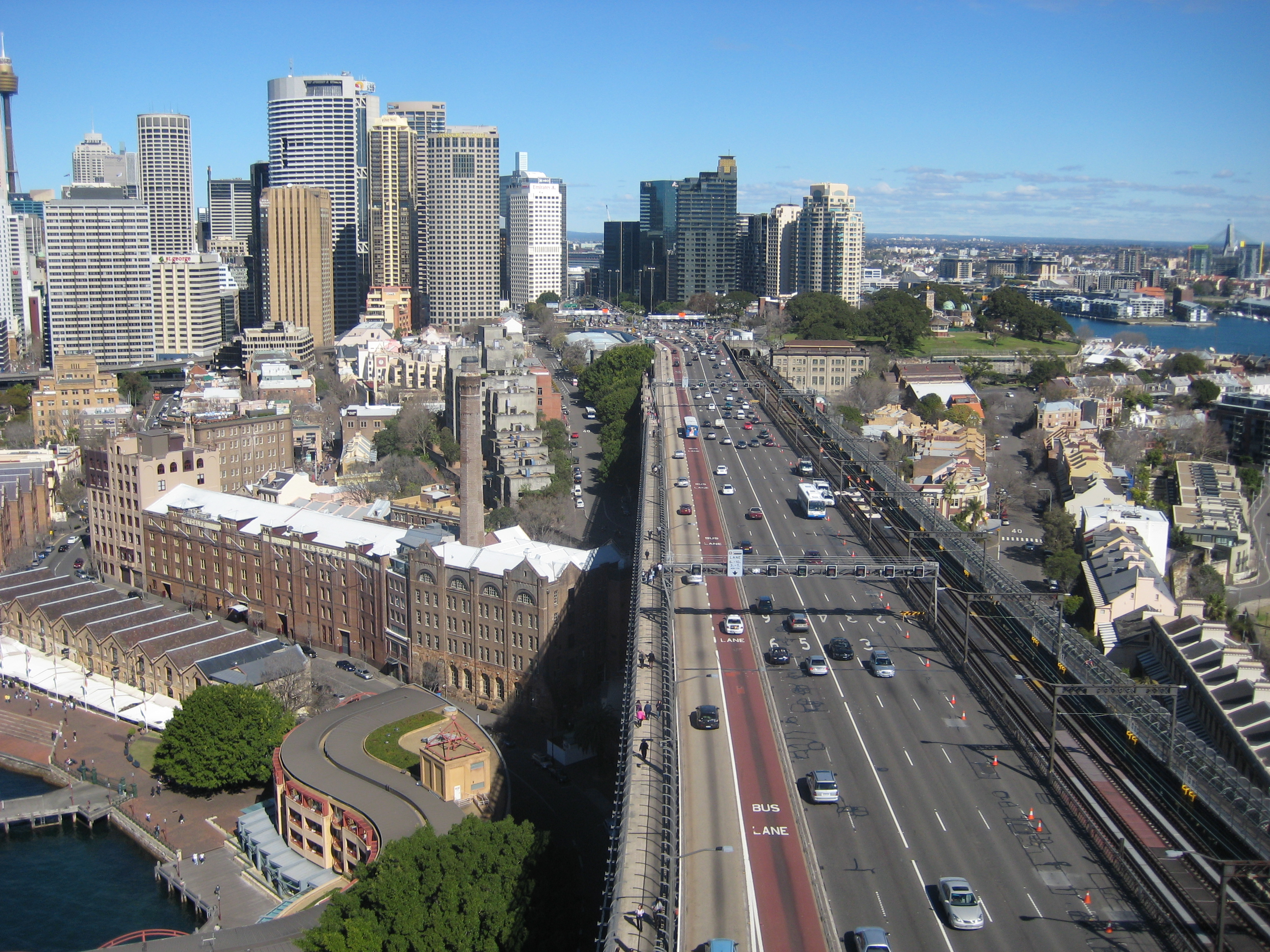
Southern approach of the Sydney Harbour Bridge with Dawes Point to the right. 2008

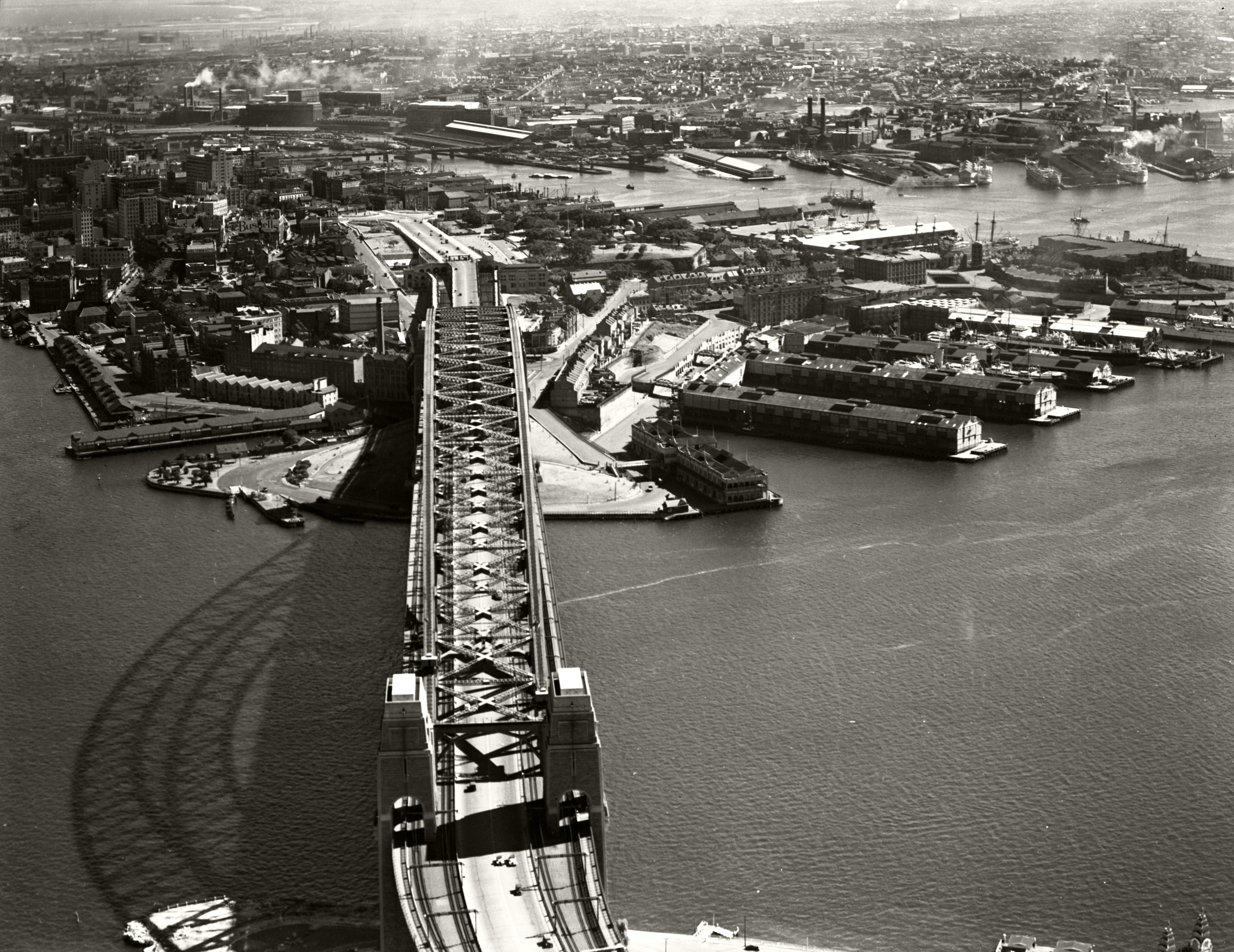
Aerial view of Dawes point in the 1930s. The 9 Wharves date from between 1906 and 1922.

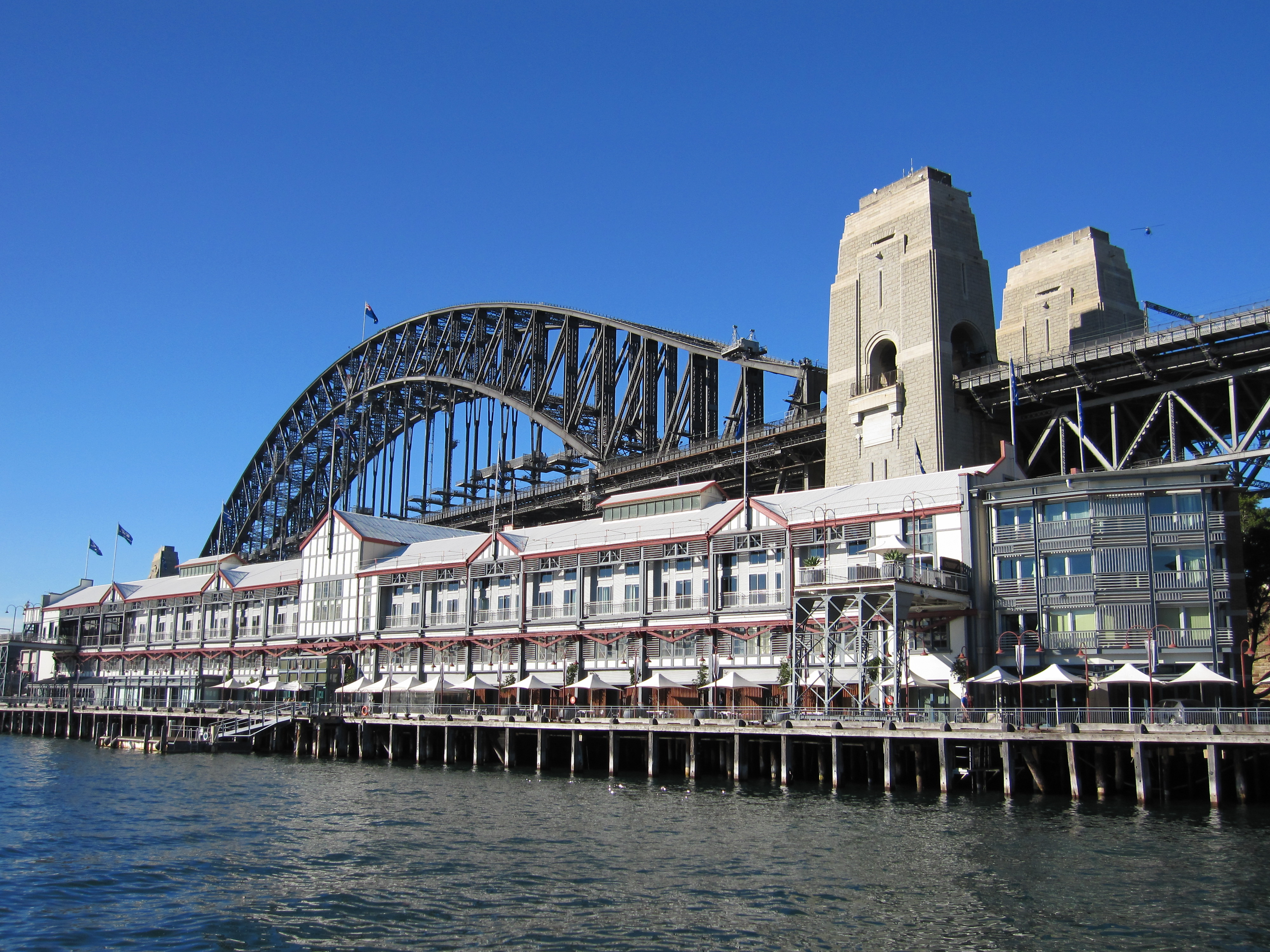
Pier One, Walsh Bay. 2009

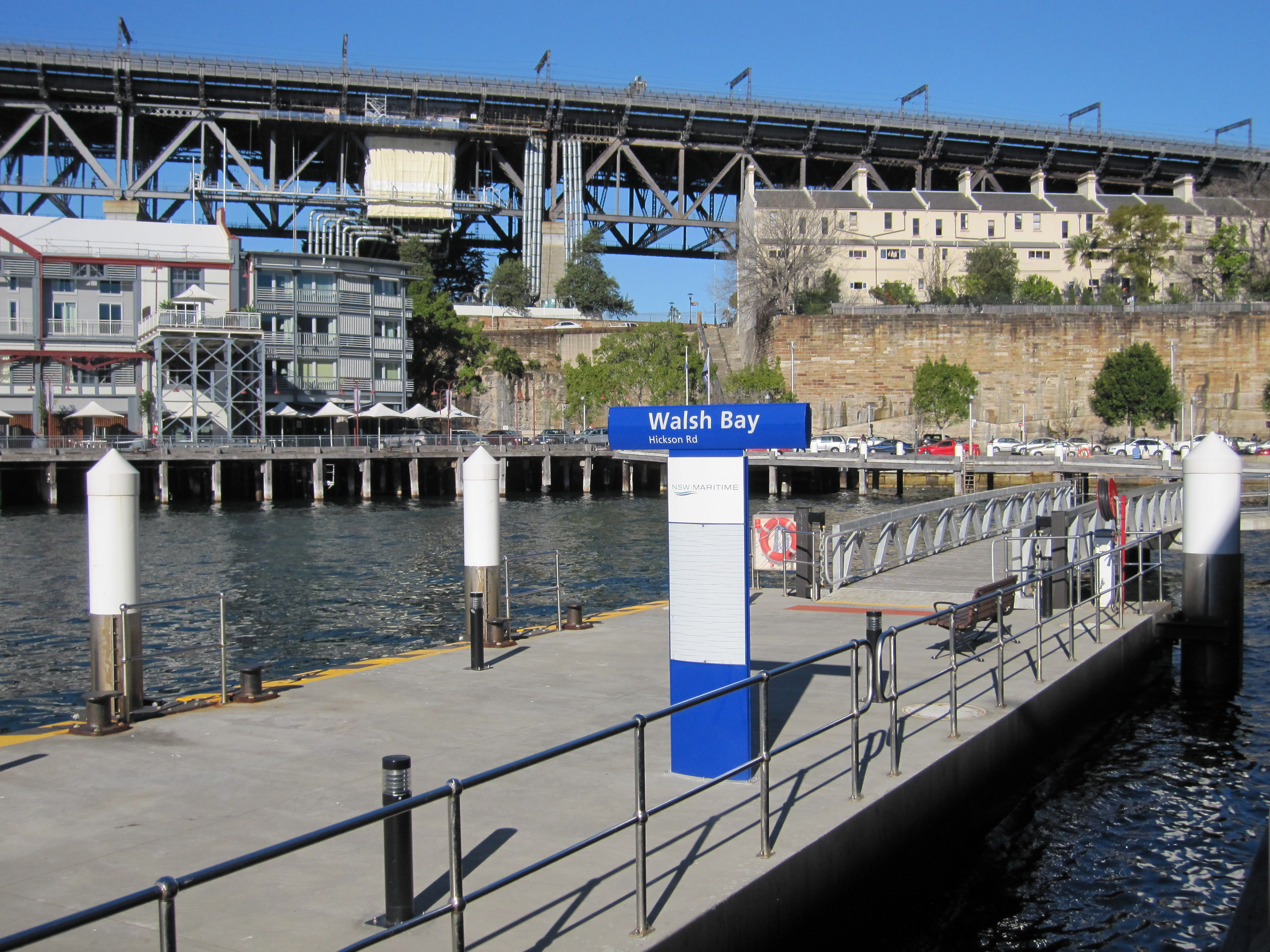
Walsh Bay ferry wharf. 2009

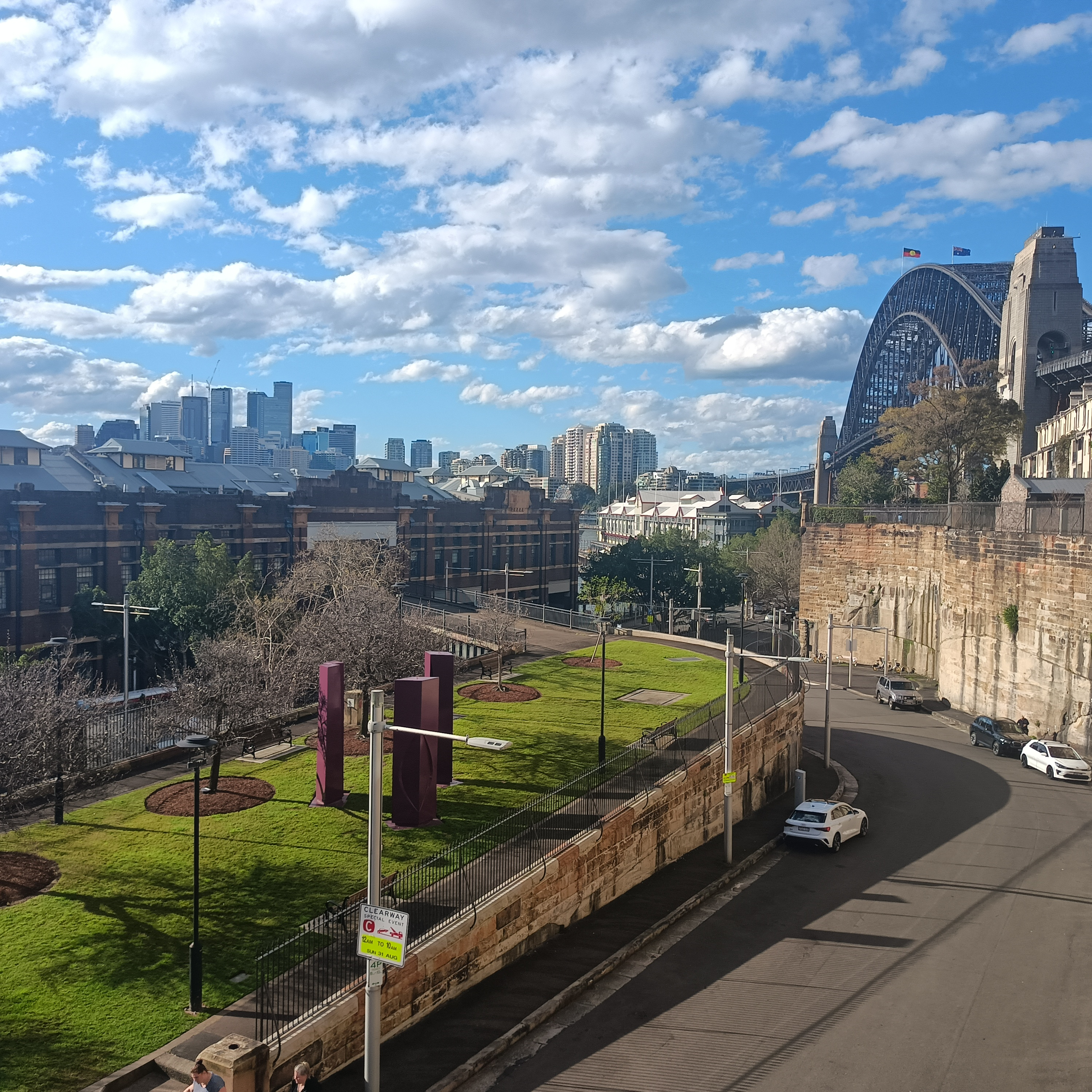
Pottinger Park, Dawes Point. 2025

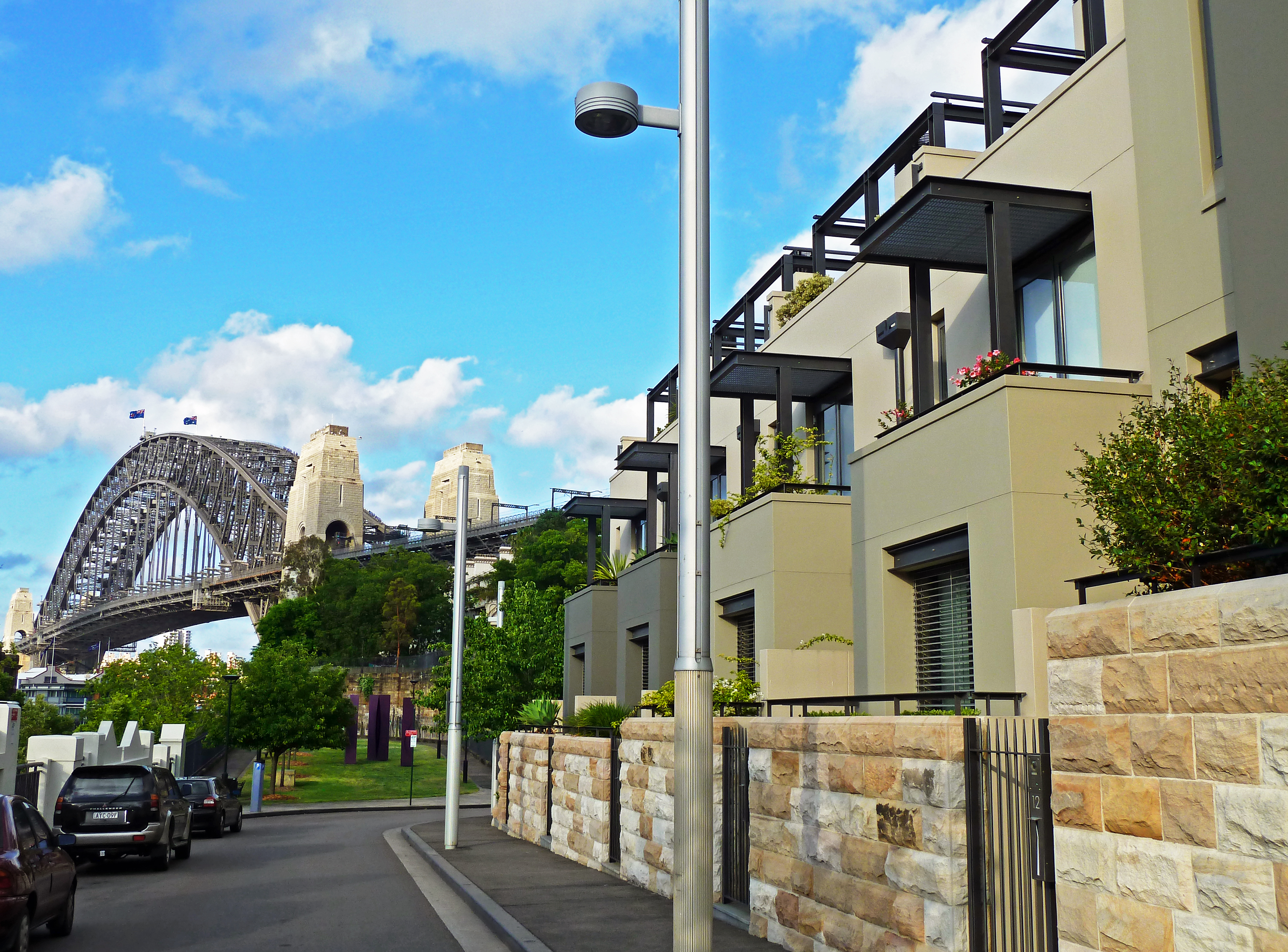
Terraces, Pottinger Street, Dawes Point, 2011

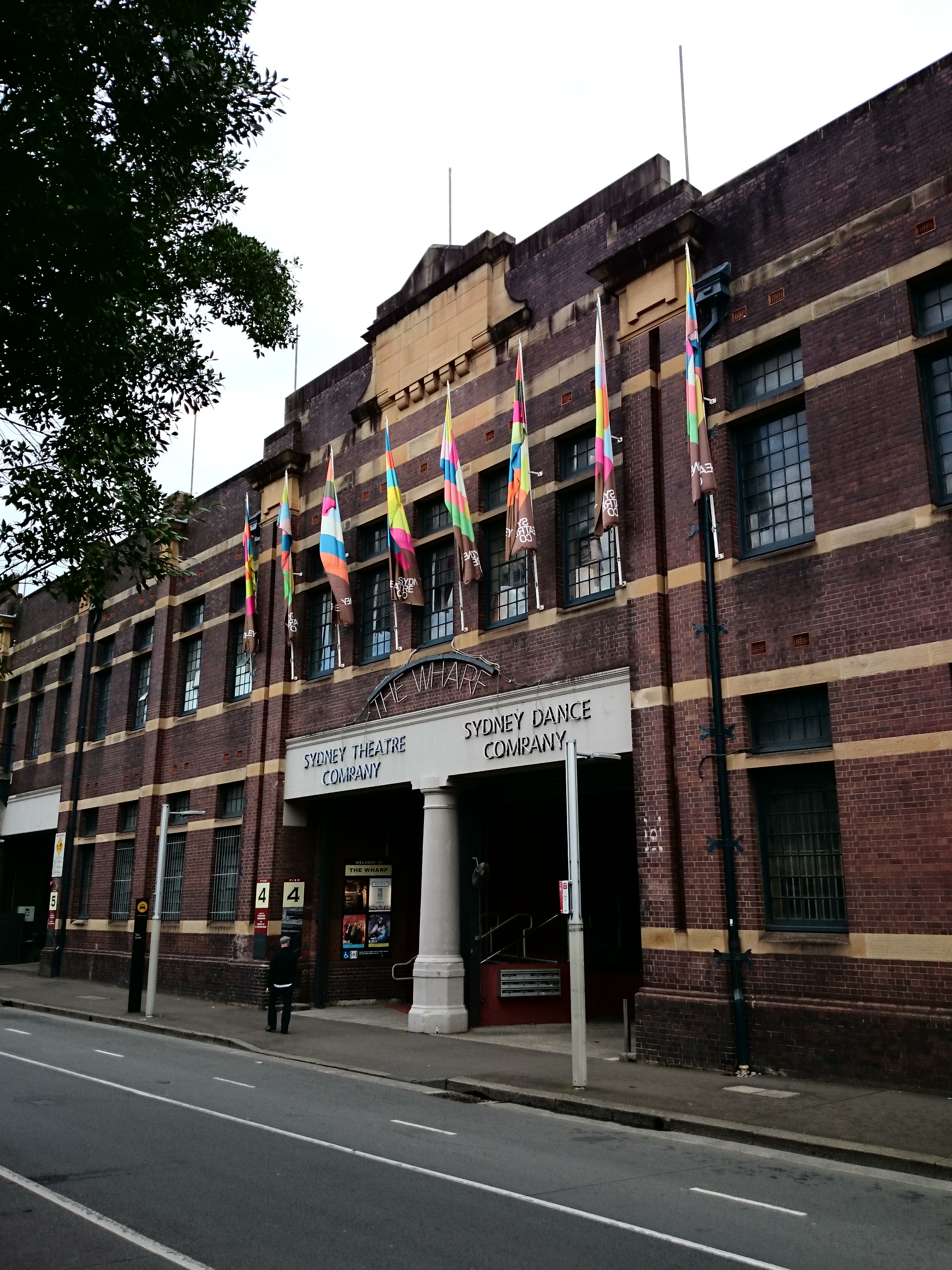
The entrance to Pier 4/5 which is a renovated cargo wharf house. The Wharf Theatres, which are part of the Sydney Theatre Company, are located in Pier 4/5. 2014

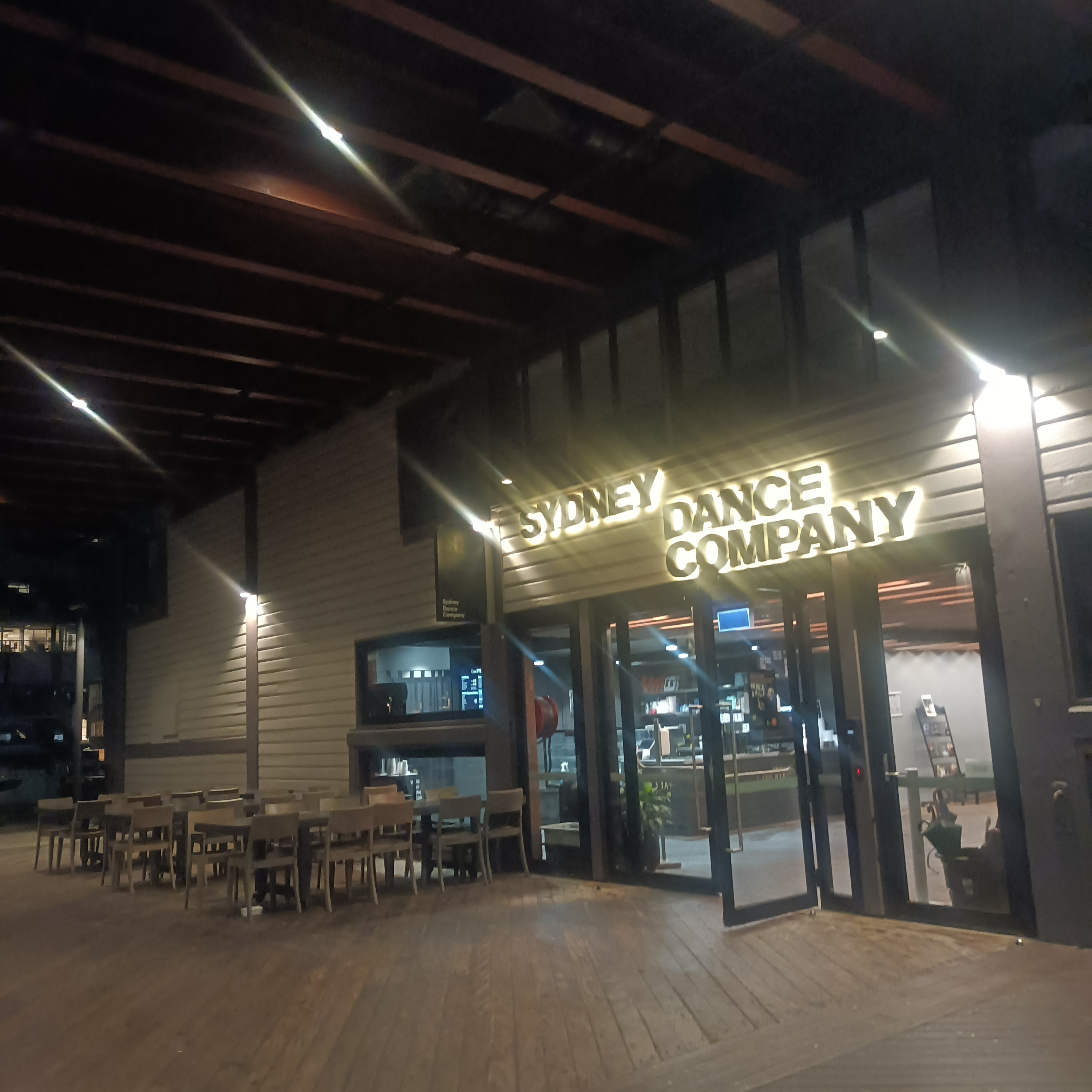
A Sydney Dance Company sign above an entrance to the Wharf theatres at pier 4/5. 2026

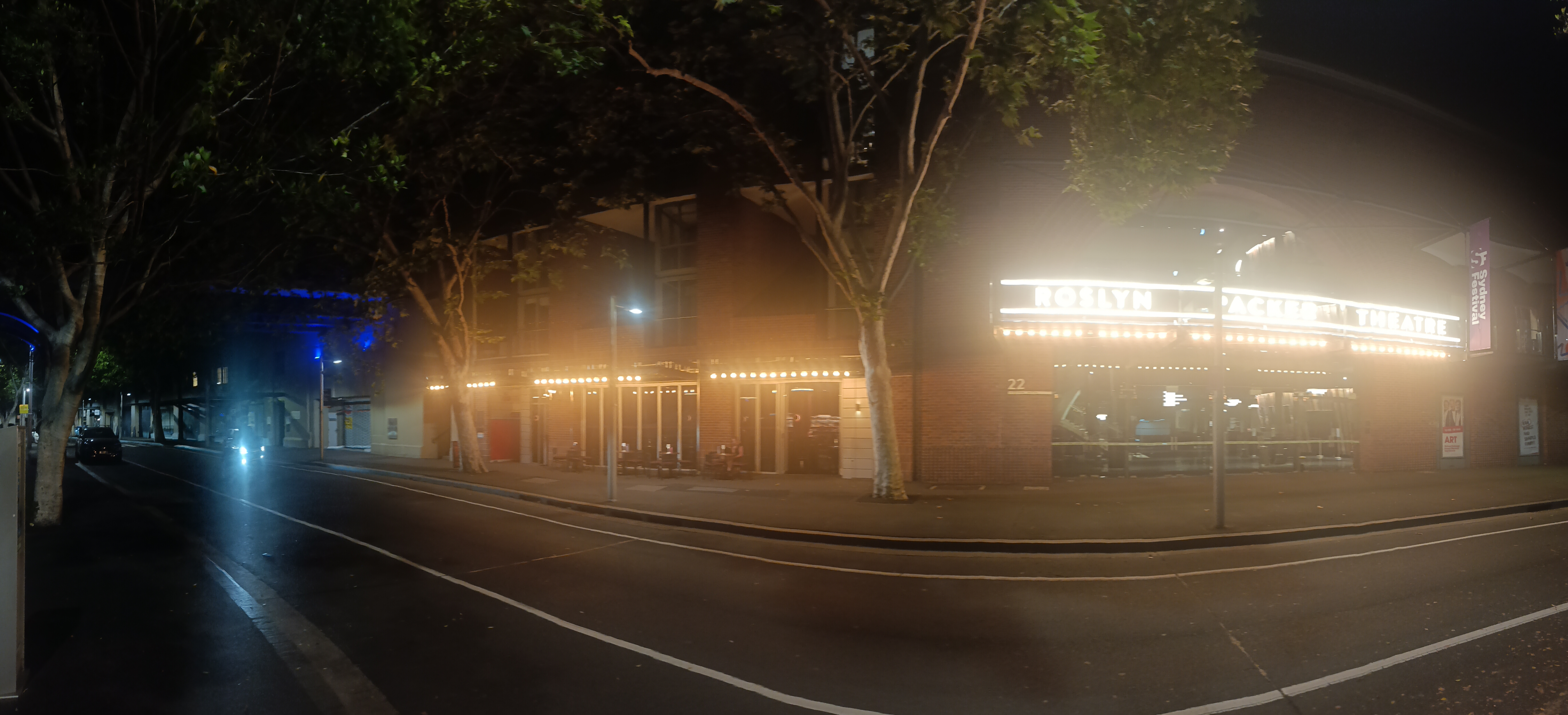
The Roslyn Packer Theatre is also operated by the Sydney Theatre Company and sits adjacent to pier 6/7 in Millers Point. 2026

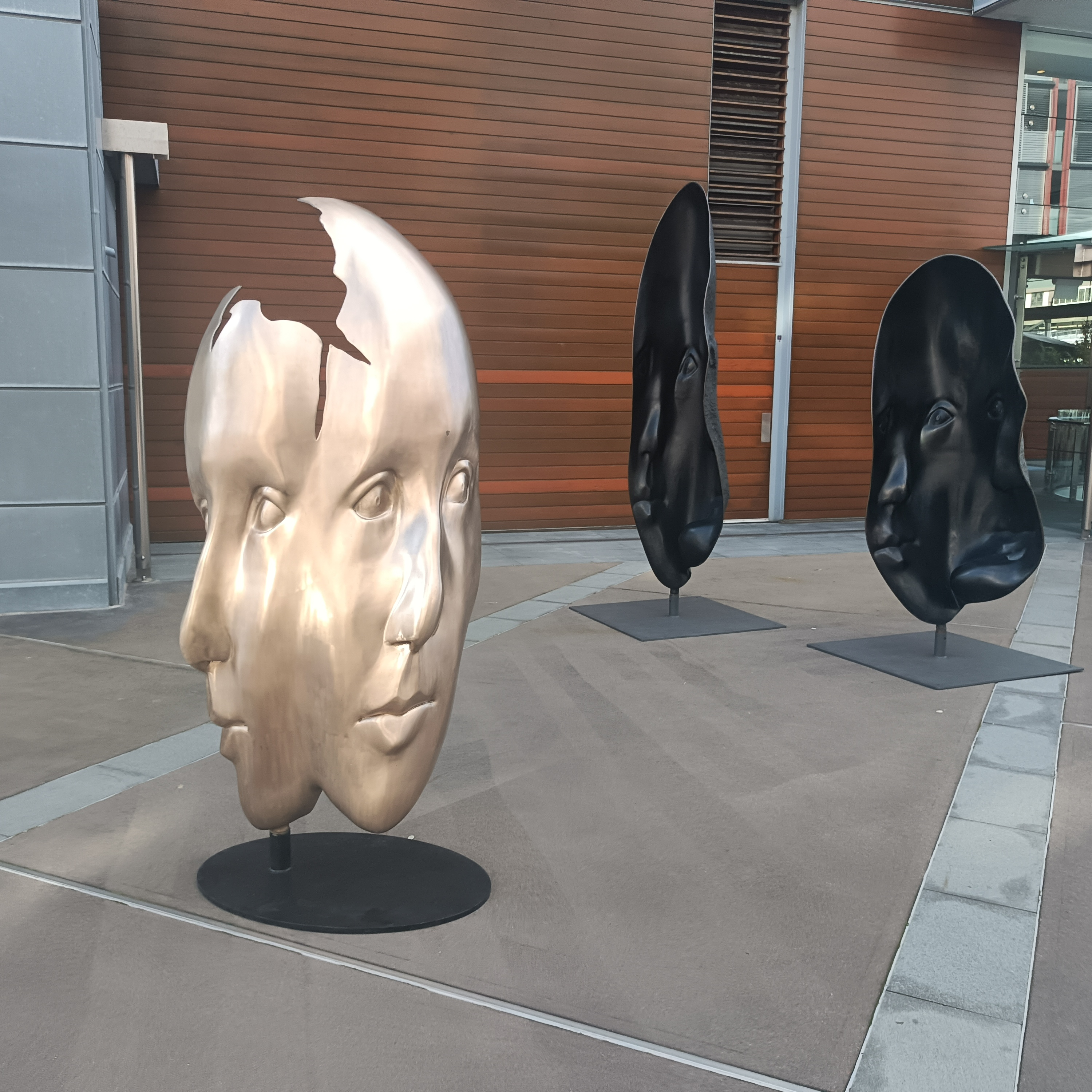
"Re-Emergence" by Sonia Payes in front of pier 6/7. The sculpture was a part of a temporary installation after which it was moved to Woolloomooloo. 2025

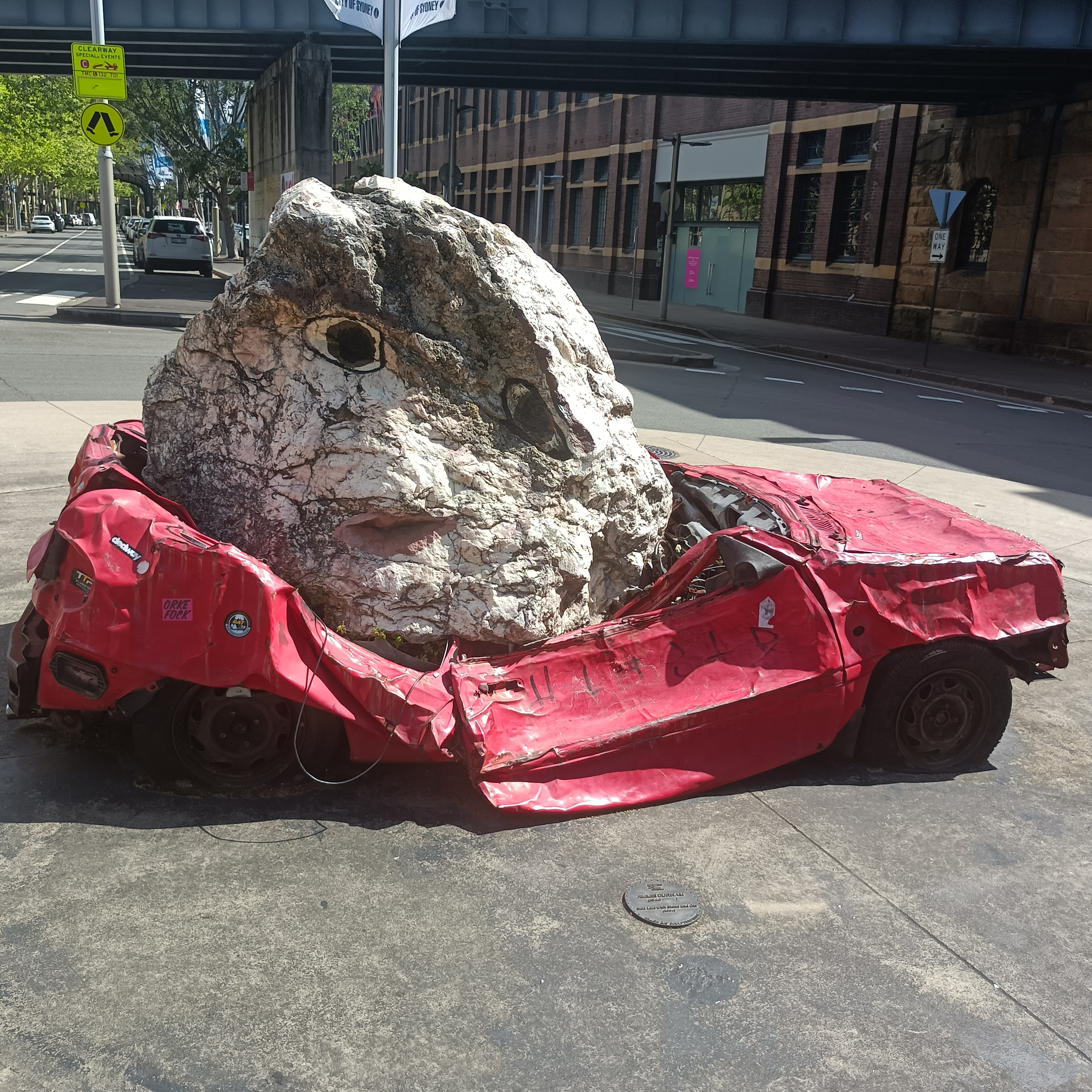
An art installation by Jimmie Durham titled "Still Life with Stone & Car". Created in 2003 and originally located near the Sydney Opera House, in 2006 it was moved to a roundabout in front of Pier 2/3 in Dawes point. 2025

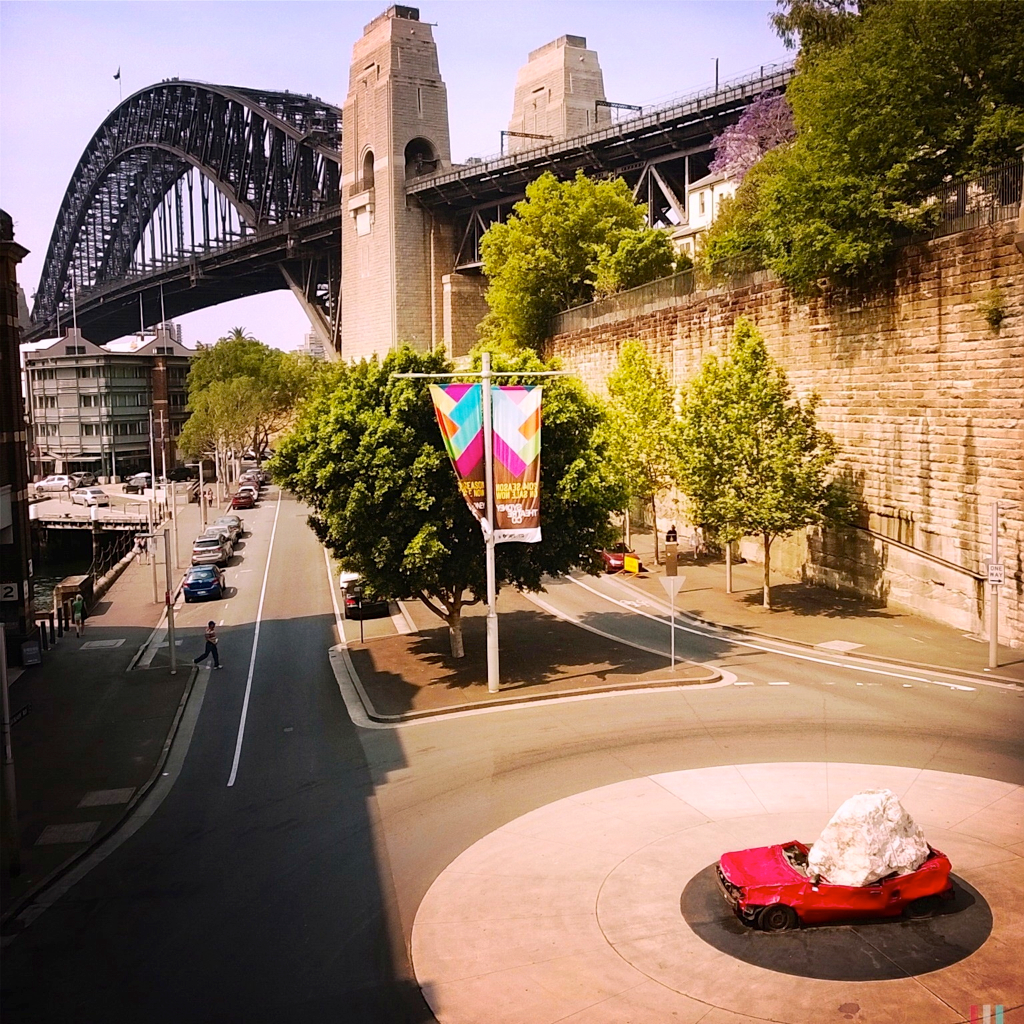
A view of the Sydney Harbour Bridge taken from the footbridge connecting pier 2/3 to Pottinger street reserve.
