= Dawesleigh =

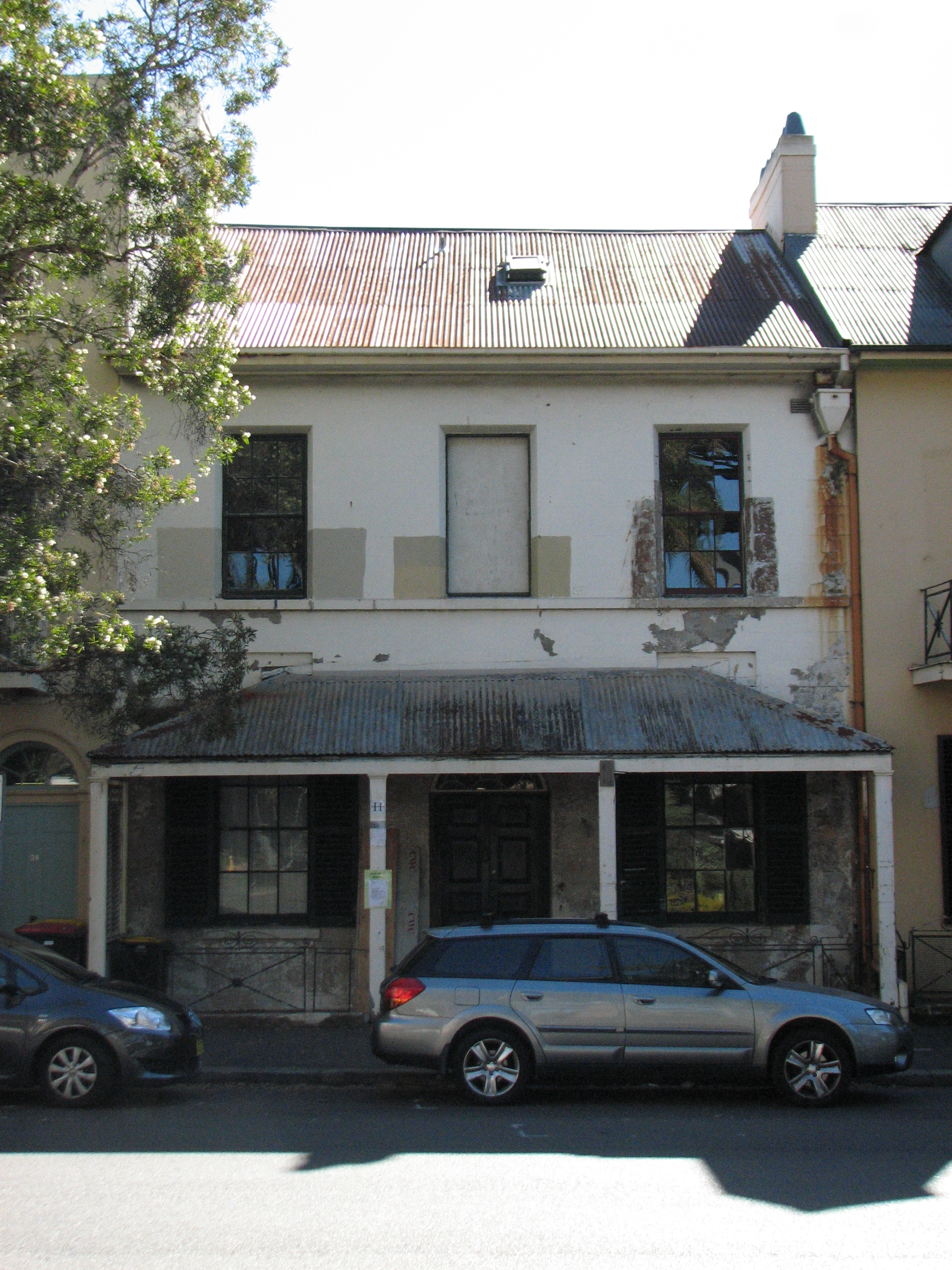
- Dawesleigh, 37 Lower Fort Street, Dawes Point, NSW, being renovated in 2019.

- Location within Sydney Location within Australia
- 33.8563°S 151.2072°E
- Location: 37 Lower Fort Street, Dawes Point, City of Sydney, New South Wales, Australia

History
- Built: 1830–1840

Site notes
- Architectural style: Colonial Georgian

New South Wales Heritage Register
- Official name: Dawesleigh; Royal College of Radiologists; 37 Lower Fort Street
- Type: State heritage (built)
- Designated: 2 April 1999
- Reference no.: 522
- Category: Residence

Dawesleigh is a heritage-listed residence and former offices located at 37 Lower Fort Street in the inner city Sydney suburb of Dawes Point, New South Wales, Australia. It was built from 1830 to 1840. It is also known as Royal College of Radiologists and 37 Lower Fort Street. The property is privately owned. It was added to the New South Wales State Heritage Register on 2 April 1999.

== History ==
One in a row of substantial Colonial Georgian residential terraces with sweeping views. Believed to be one of the first residences built in Fort Street, it was probably built before 1830, on part of the estate of Robert Campbell, a well-known Sydney merchant of the day.

Dawesleigh was built as a merchant house and residence by Thomas Dyer Edwards and Matthew Dysart Hunter who were both in their early twenties at the time. Thomas had been an orphan in the southern English port town of Shoreham. Thomas worked briefly on a Jamaican plantation before heading to China, but he was not suited to the climate. In 1833 slavery was abolished in the British Empire, the East India Company lost its trading monopoly over China, Edwards and Hunter arrived in Sydney from Canton to set up their trading company which soon controlled most of the China trade, and they built this house as their residence and headquarters. Their company which they named Edwards & Hunter, was closely aligned with China trading company Jardine, Matheson and Co. Throughout the 1830s, Edwards & Hunter flourished and new partners joined the firm and lived in Lower Fort Street, mostly in nearby houses. These new partners included Mashfield Mason, William Fane De Salis and John Thacker. By the early 1840s, Edwards had retired and returned with his family to England and Hunter returned to Scotland.

An outbreak of the Bubonic plague in 1903 provided a pretext for the government to resume the houses of Lower Fort Street and indeed the whole of Dawes Point, Millers Point and The Rocks. There were plans for new wharves and bond stores to the west of Lower Fort Street and a harbour crossing to the east. Some houses were demolished, flats were built for workers on some of the now-vacant land, and the houses that remained were rented out. Dawesleigh was rented to John Haroldson, and by 1910 to Alfred S. Carpenter.

From soon after the end of World War I Dawesleigh became a hostel run by a succession of landladies who included Ethel Wilson (1925), Rose Shackel (1936), Florence Ann Dee (1956) and France Barwyck from 1957 to 1975, when it was extensively remodelled for the Royal Australasian College of Radiologists. The College left in the early 1990s and squatters moved in. The house was almost derelict when the NSW Government chose to sell it. The current owners purchased Dawesleigh in 2009 and began restoration work.

== Description ==
Located within the Millers Point historic district on an elevated site with views over the harbour to both front and rear.

A former Georgian town house of two stories with basement and attic probably built c. 1840. It is of three bays in width with central eight panelled door above which is a fine elliptical fanlight supported either side by fluted pilasters. Internally it still retains the majority of its original joinery and other details.

=== Condition ===
As at 12 June 1998, the site was in good condition. This former Georgian style townhouse retains its essential nineteenth century character. Internally it still retains the majority of its original joinery and other details. The interiors have been refurbished.

== Heritage listing ==
As at 26 May 1998, of historical significance as physical evidence of the development of substantial villas and townhouses on the ridges overlooking the harbour. Of environmental significance for its contribution to an architecturally diverse and historically important residential streetscape. Of architectural significance as an excellent example of its style.

Dawesleigh was listed on the New South Wales State Heritage Register on 2 April 1999 having satisfied the following criteria.

The place is important in demonstrating the course, or pattern, of cultural or natural history in New South Wales.

Of historical significance as physical evidence of the development of substantial villas and townhouses on the ridges overlooking the harbour. Of environmental significance for its contribution to an architecturally diverse and historically important residential streetscape.

The place is important in demonstrating aesthetic characteristics and/or a high degree of creative or technical achievement in New South Wales.

Of environmental significance for its contribution to an architecturally diverse and historically important residential streetscape. Of architectural significance as an excellent example of its style.

== See also ==
- Australian residential architectural styles
- Media related to Dawesleigh at Wikimedia Commons
