= 30–42 Lower Fort Street, Millers Point =

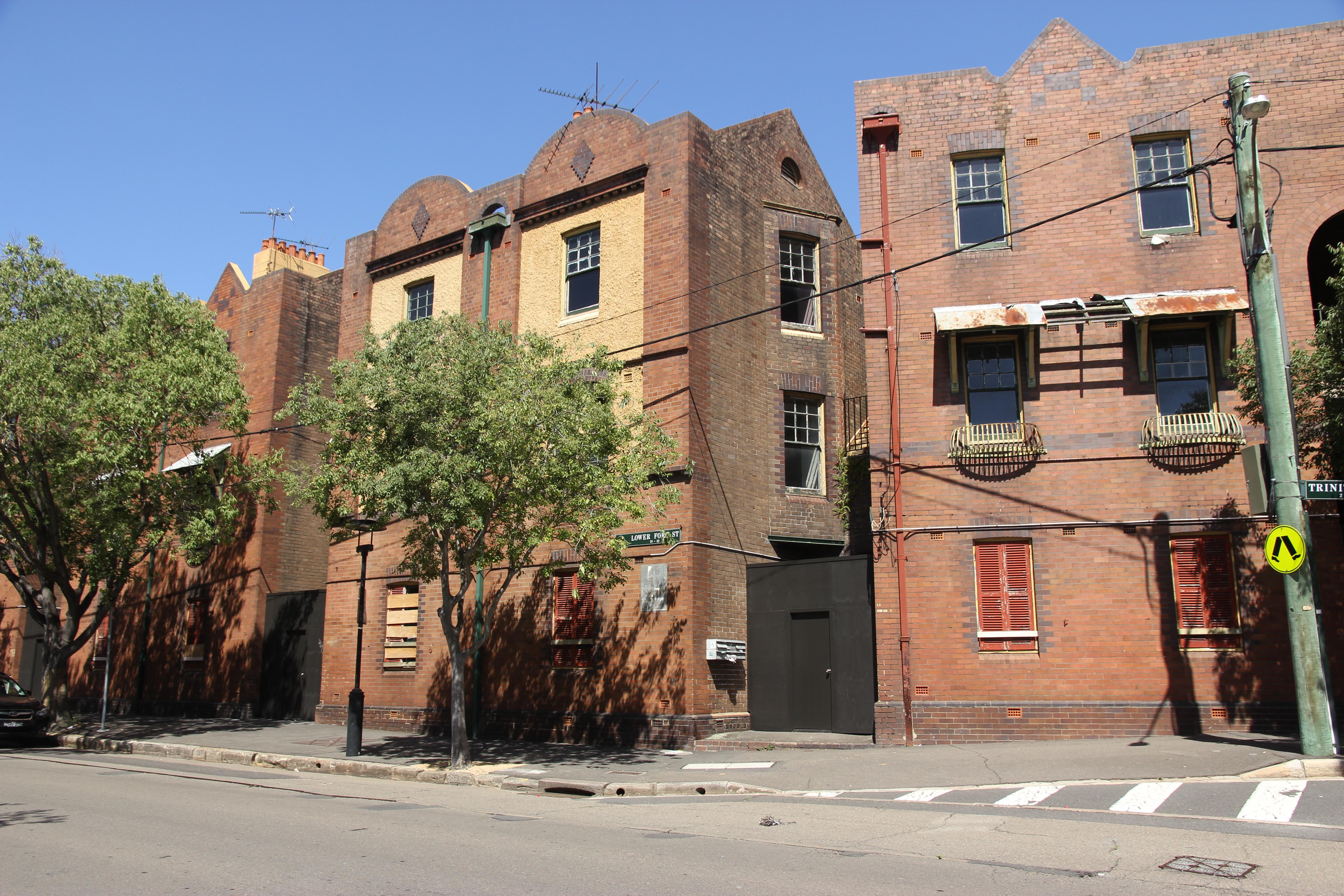
- Disused and boarded up former public housing located at 30–42 Lower Fort Street (left) and 2–4 Trinity Avenue (right), pictured in 2019.

- Location within Sydney Location within Australia
- 33.8571°S 151.2070°E
- Location: 30, 32, 34, 36, 38, 40, 42 Lower Fort Street, Millers Point, City of Sydney, New South Wales, Australia

History
- Built: c. 1910

Site notes
- Architect: NSW Government Architect
- Architectural style: Federation Arts and Crafts

New South Wales Heritage Register
- Official name: Residence
- Type: State heritage (built)
- Designated: 2 April 1999
- Reference no.: 894
- Type: Historic site

The apartment buildings at this address are notable as an early example of government-built housing the Sydney docks area, built in 1910. The set of 25 flats are known by their address, 30–42 Lower Fort Street, Millers Point, in the City of Sydney, in Australia.

== History ==
Millers Point, adjacent to The Rocks and Circular Quay, is one of the earliest areas of European settlement in Australia, and a focus for maritime activities. By the mid 19th century, the areas became known for its substandard and crowded housing, populated especially by dock workers. It was the centre for an outbreak of the Black Plague in 1900, which led to government intervention to provide a better, more hygienic, standard of housing.

One result was this set of apartments built in 1910, designed by the NSW Government Architect under Walter Liberty Vernon. They were managed by the Sydney Harbour Trust, later the Maritime Services Board, then eventually the NSW Department of Housing from 1982.

The property was added to the New South Wales State Heritage Register on 2 April 1999.

In 2014 it was slated for sale as part of the State Government's program of divestment of high-value social housing in the area, promising to build more and higher quality housing elsewhere, and the sale took place in 2017.

In 2025, the renovation of the blocks into updated apartments for sale was completed. Designed by Neeson Murcutt Neille, it won the Award For Heritage (creative Adaptation) in 2025 as part of the NSW Architecture Awards.

== Description ==
Arranged somewhat like terraces, but described as 'Dublin Tenements', they consist of six blocks of three floors, separated by a few metres and access stairs, and backing onto a high cliff. Each block has two flats per floor, arranged side-by-side, with one half-block with one flat per floor. Most were built with two bedrooms, while the set on the angled street corner has three. They had laundry facilities and a pantry but no kitchen, and many of the rooms had little light.

All exterior walls are in face brick, in a restrained Federation Arts and Crafts style. The roofs are corrugated iron, and there are timber bracketed sun hoods to the first floor front windows, with cast iron balconettes.

The renovation works involved some opening out of the interiors, while retaining many original features, creating contemporary kitchens and bathrooms, and adding a bedroom to the rear.

== See also ==
- Australian residential architectural styles
- 28 Lower Fort Street
- 2–4 Trinity Avenue
