= Milton Terrace =

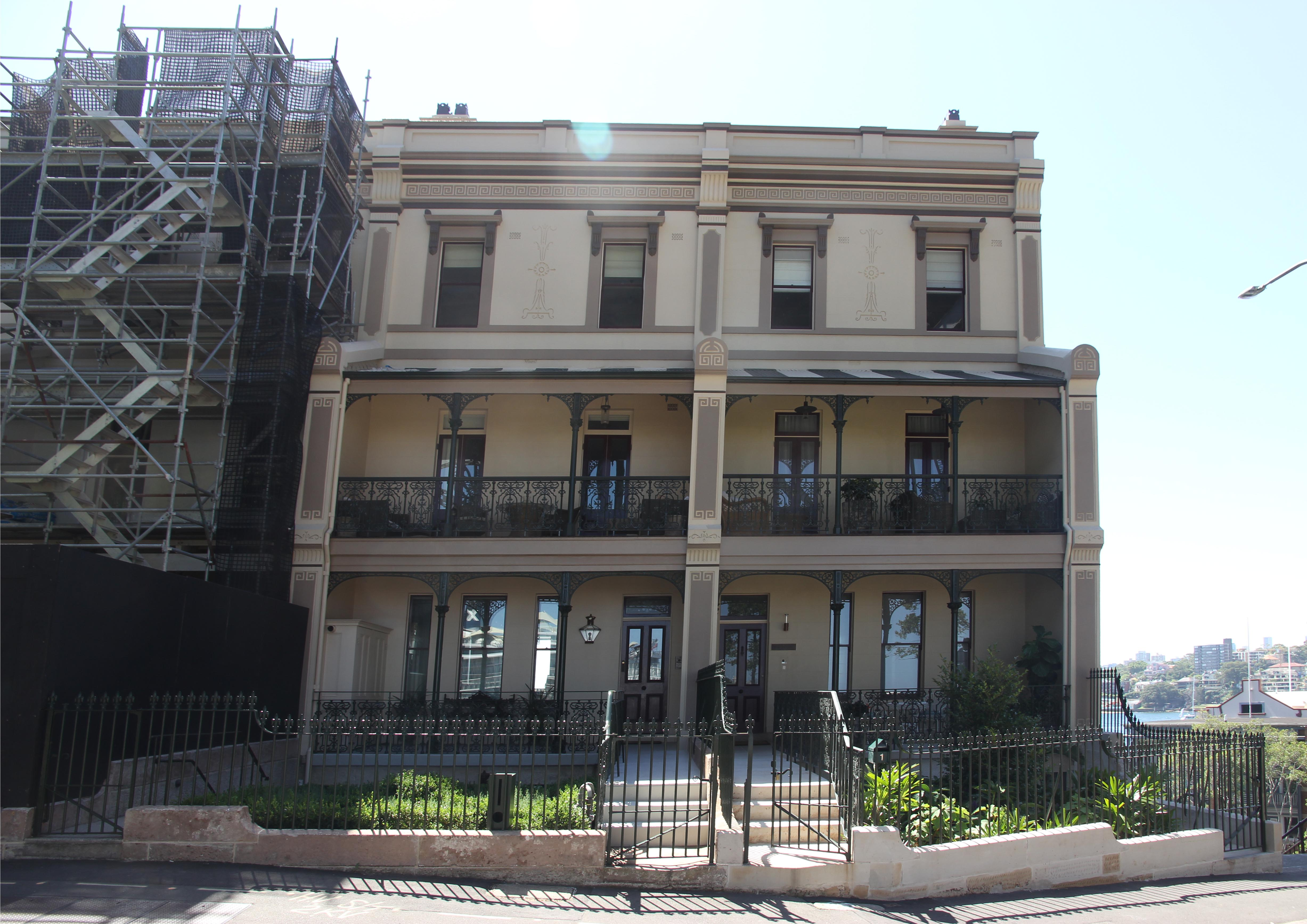
- 1–3 Lower Fort Street, fully restored, with 5 Lower Fort Street at left, under restoration, pictured in January 2019.

- Location within Sydney Location within Australia
- 33.8556°S 151.2078°E
- Location: 1–19 Lower Fort Street, Millers Point, City of Sydney, New South Wales, Australia

History
- Built: 1880–1882

Site notes
- Architectural style: Victorian Italianate

New South Wales Heritage Register
- Official name: Milton Terrace
- Type: State heritage (built)
- Designated: 2 April 1999
- Reference no.: 885
- Type: Terrace
- Category: Residential buildings (private)

Milton Terrace is a heritage-listed series of terrace houses located at 1–19 Lower Fort Street, in the inner city Sydney suburb of Millers Point in the City of Sydney local government area of New South Wales, Australia. It was built from 1880 to 1882. The property was added to the New South Wales State Heritage Register on 2 April 1999.

== History ==
Millers Point is one of the earliest areas of European settlement in Australia, and a focus for maritime activities. This building is one of a group of ten very grand three storey Victorian terraces built during the 1880s. First tenanted by the NSW Department of Housing in 1984.

== Description ==
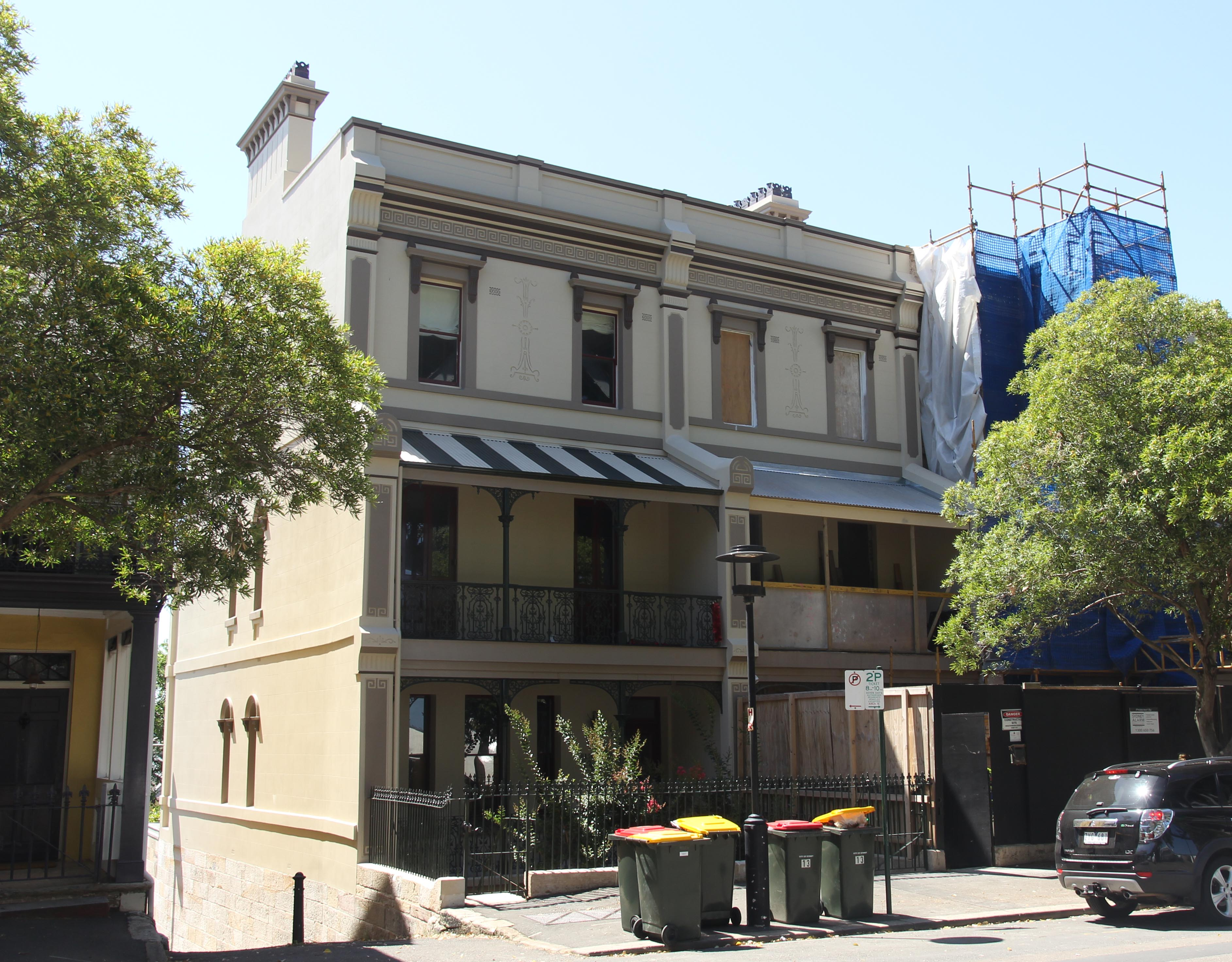
19 Lower Fort Street, the most southern in the terrace row; with Nos. 15 and 17 under restoration; pictured in 2019.

Grand three storey, five bedroom, Victorian Italianate terrace with basement, one of ten in a row. Decorative facade with large incised motifs and iron lace.

Verandah infill on second storey, deep projecting parapet, and spear fence enclosing small front garden.

Each allotment contains a four-storey residence (including basement) with front (to the east) and rear (to the west) gardens. Each terrace is accessed via an entry walkway leading from the Lower Fort Street (footpath) across the front area and front gardens. Each had two pedestrian gates, located along the front boundary and within the front gardens - these are original and should be maintained or (when missing or damaged) reconstructed/replaced. Each terrace houe is fenced separately with iron balustrade fencing to the front gardens and timber paling fencing to the rear gardens. A c. 1900 photograph shows the garden setting (front) to the individual houses. By this date, many functioned as boarding houses and yet signs of middle class gentility remain. Also to the rear of a number of the allotments are located outbuildings and sheds of varying construction dates, typically used as additional storage space and laundry facilities. Some substantial trees exist within the rear gardens of the terraces, most notably in the rear of no's 1, 17 & 19 Lower Fort Street. The front gardens consist of a mix of tree and shrub plantings with little consistency in form or species selection between the individual terraces.

Storeys: Three. Construction: Painted rendered masonry, corrugated galvanised iron roof. Timber and cast iron balcony. Spear fence cast iron. Style: Victorian Italianate.

The external condition of the property is good.

=== Modifications and dates ===
External: Verandah infill. Joinery renewed, damaged detailing.

== Heritage listing ==
As at 12 January 2004, this group of terraces is historically significant as:

- a significant example of continuing private investment in fine residential property in Lower Fort Street during the later 19th century and the largest such investment of the period;
- its site and buildings were associated from the early 1820s with the firm of William Walker & Co., merchants, the family and business connection continuing with later investment by Walker's son-in-law Donald Lanarch, a noted banker and businessman;
- its site of buildings and residences was associated with some of the earliest wharfage (early 1820s) at Millers Point and with merchants important in the development of commercial life in Sydney and beyond. It is also associated with Captain John Nicholson, harbour master;
- some of the houses were used from the 1890s as boarding houses and have been in use for over a century by the local community;
- it has the potential to contribute to an understanding of several phases of the development of Millers Point.

It is of aesthetic significance as:

- a very fine example of late Victorian boom style terraces on a site with landmark qualities;
- as a rare surviving example of a very grand scale terrace in the "Greek" style.

The group is of aesthetic value as a streetscape element, being an outstanding and largely intact group facing Dawes Park with spectacular harbour views to the east. With a slight change in orientation from the terraces further up the street, Milton Terrace creates a strong and handsome termination to the extraordinary collection of 19th century housing forms that make up the western side of Lower Fort Street.

Milton Terrace at 1–19 Lower Fort St represents possibly the finest extant row of 1880s terraces in Sydney.

It is part of the Millers Point Conservation Area, an intact residential and maritime precinct. It contains residential buildings and civic spaces dating from the 1830s and is an important example of 19th century adaptation of the landscape.

Milton Terrace was listed on the New South Wales State Heritage Register on 2 April 1999.

== See also ==
- Australian residential architectural styles
- 21–23 Lower Fort Street
