= 24–26 Lower Fort Street, Millers Point =

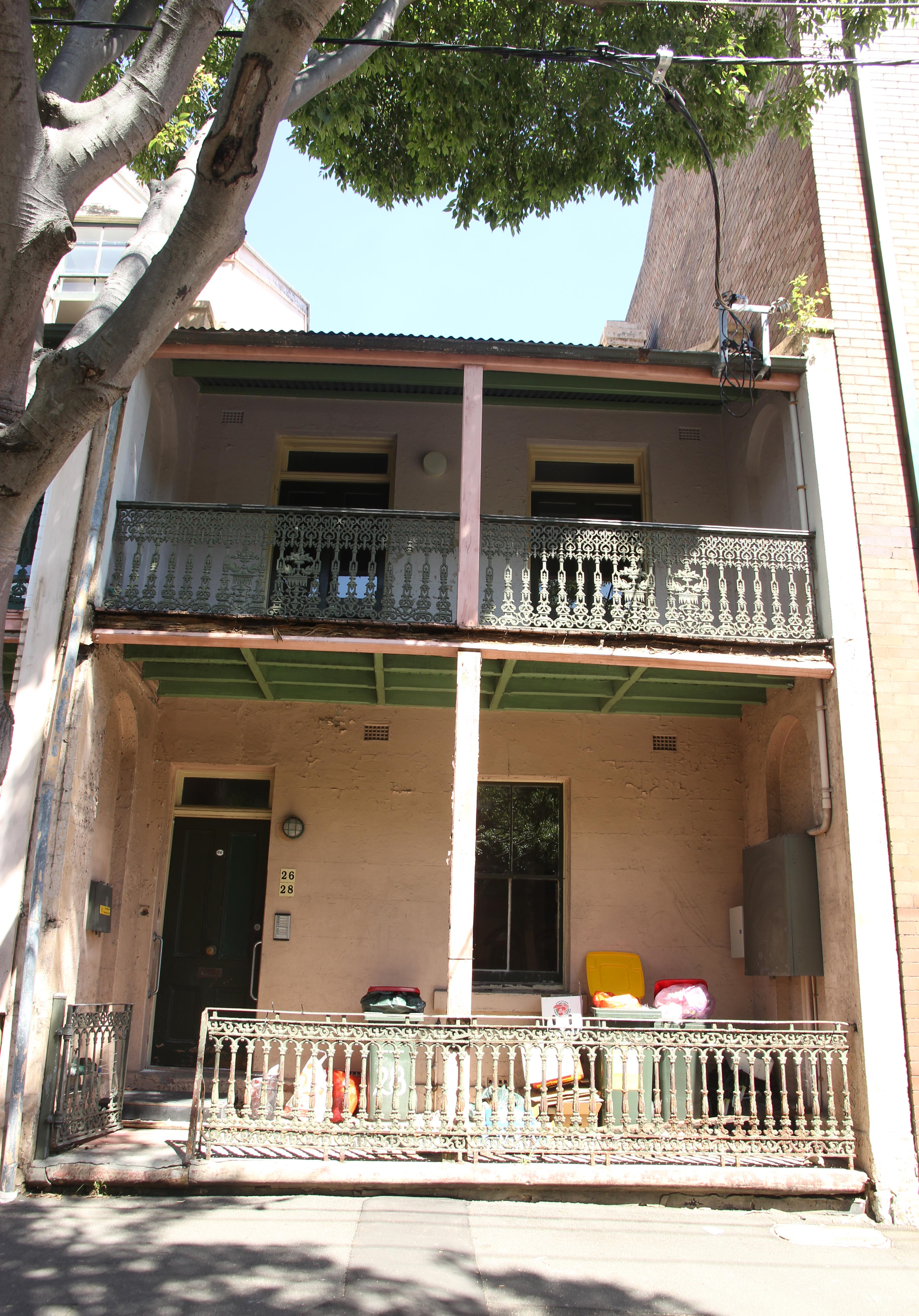
- 26 Lower Fort Street, pictured in 2019.

- Location within Sydney Location within Australia
- 33.8569°S 151.2072°E
- Location: 24, 26 Lower Fort Street, Millers Point, City of Sydney, New South Wales, Australia

History
- Built: c. 1860

Site notes
- Architectural style: Victorian Georgian

New South Wales Heritage Register
- Official name: Building
- Type: State heritage (built)
- Designated: 2 April 1999
- Reference no.: 852
- Type: Historic site

24–26 Lower Fort Street, Millers Point are heritage-listed terrace houses located at 24, 26 Lower Fort Street, in the inner city Sydney suburb of Millers Point in the City of Sydney local government area of New South Wales, Australia. The property was added to the New South Wales State Heritage Register on 2 April 1999.

== History ==
Millers Point is one of the earliest areas of European settlement in Australia, and a focus for maritime activities. This property was constructed c. 1860, forming part of a row of substantial Georgian townhouses. First tenanted by the NSW Department of Housing in 1991.

== Description ==
Two storey late Georgian townhouse with attic roof behind parapetted facade, two storey timber verandah with cast iron balustrading. Townhouse converted to four one-bedroom units. Storeys: Two; Construction: Painted rendered masonry, corrugated galvanised iron roof, iron lace, painted timber joinery. Style: Victorian Georgian.

The external condition of the property is fair.

=== Modifications and dates ===
External: Dormer modified, timberwork attached.

== Heritage listing ==
As at 23 November 2000, this townhouse was constructed c. 1860, and is part of a substantial row of Georgian townhouses.

It is part of the Millers Point Conservation Area, an intact residential and maritime precinct. It contains residential buildings and civic spaces dating from the 1830s and is an important example of 19th century adaptation of the landscape.

24–26 Lower Fort Street, Millers Point was listed on the New South Wales State Heritage Register on 2 April 1999.
