= 21–23 Lower Fort Street, Millers Point =

Heritage-listed terrace houses in Sydney, Australia

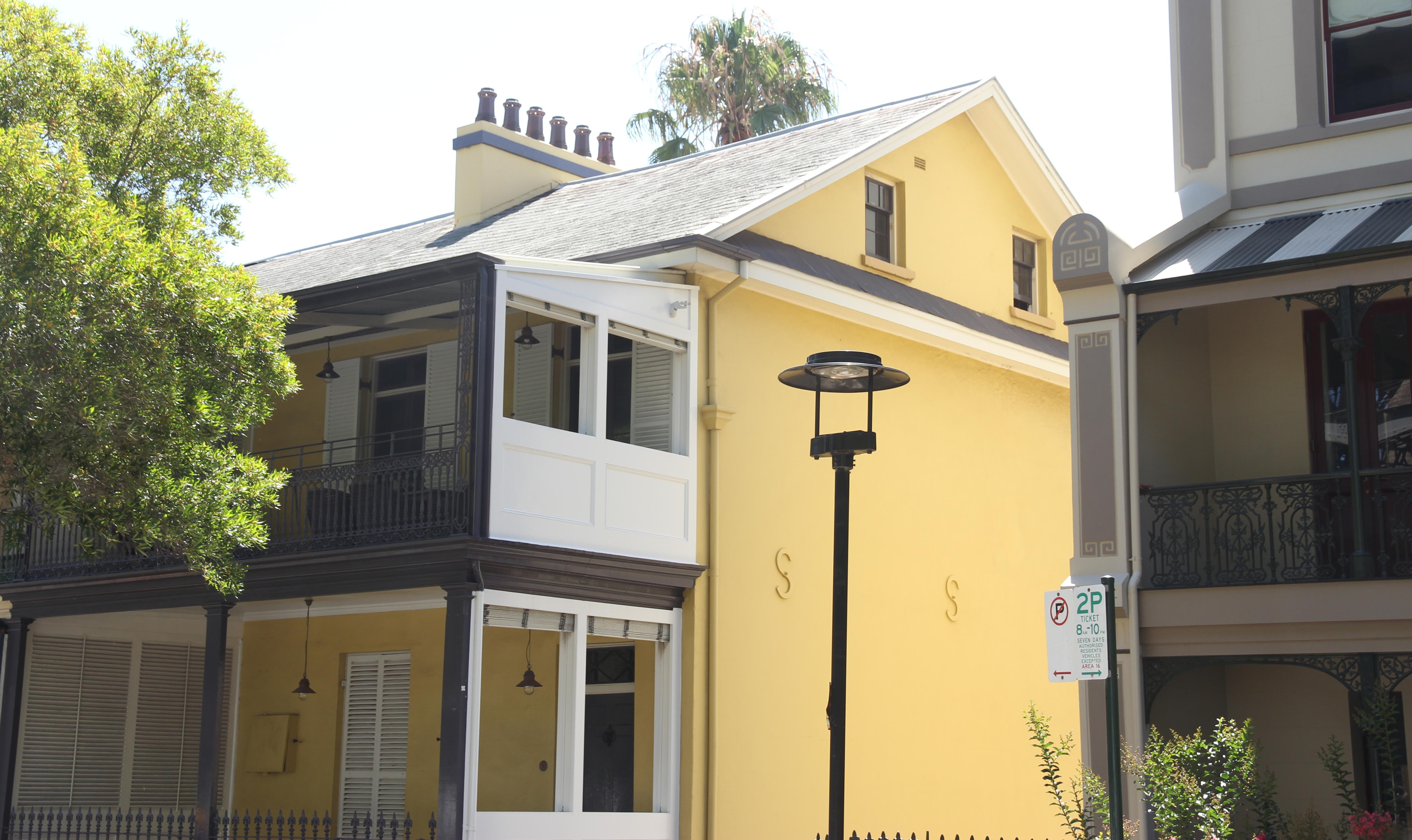
- 21 Lower Fort Street, pictured at left in 2019.

- Location within Sydney Location within Australia
- 33.8559°S 151.2076°E
- Location: 21, 23 Lower Fort Street, Millers Point, City of Sydney, New South Wales, Australia

History
- Built: 1832–
- Built for: John Nicholson

Site notes
- Architect: William Smart
- Architectural style: late Colonial Georgian

New South Wales Heritage Register
- Official name: Terrace; Nicholson’s Houses
- Type: State heritage (built)
- Designated: 2 April 1999
- Reference no.: 883
- Type: Terrace
- Category: Residential buildings (private)

21–23 Lower Fort Street, Millers Point are heritage-listed terrace houses located at 21–23 Lower Fort Street, in the inner city Sydney suburb of Millers Point in the City of Sydney local government area of New South Wales, Australia. It was built from 1832. It is also known as Nicholson's Houses. The property was added to the New South Wales State Heritage Register on 2 April 1999.

== History ==
Millers Point is one of the earliest areas of European settlement in Australia, and a focus for maritime activities.

Millers Point took its name in the early days of the colony from "Jack the Miller", who built his windmills there, while Lieut. Dawes established his observatory on the point. This precinct, positioned between Barangaroo, Observatory Hill and the Sydney Harbour Bridge, contains a variety of architectural styles from early Georgian houses and tiny workmen's cottages, to the grander 19th century Victorian terraces. With much of the area given over to public housing in the 20th century, changes in ownership in the early years of the 21st century are again breathing life into these early buildings, although the need to ensure any renovation is done sensitively remains imperative.

=== 21 Lower Fort Street ===
Built in 1832 for Captain John Nicholson, Sydney's first Harbour Master, on a land grant he received from Governor Macquarie, this house is in the style of a late Colonial Georgian town home. With the help of architect William Smart, the owners have saved as much as possible of the (original) fabric and existing decorative elements, while making judicious alterations where necessary for modern living.

Exterior changes include verandah infill addition, brick addition to the rear of dwelling built after 1930. Also at rear boundary originally stood a two-story stable block. First tenanted by the NSW Department of Housing in 1984.

== Description ==
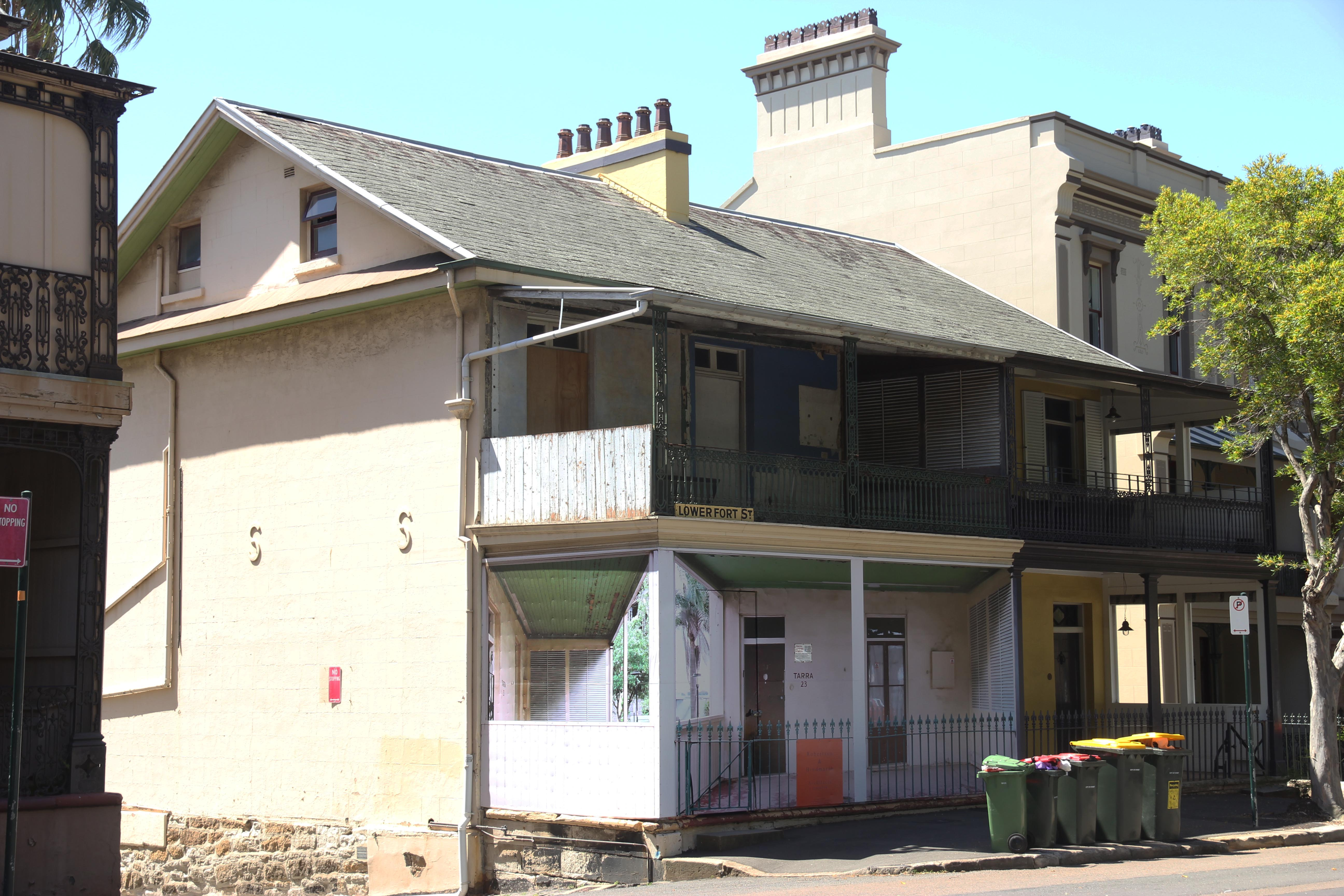
23 Lower Fort Street, pictured at left in 2019.

The property is a five-bedroom, two-story Georgian terrace with basement, facing Lower Fort Street with a slate pediment roof. Exterior joinery, especially front doors is noteworthy. The first floor verandah has mid-nineteenth century cast iron pilasters and balcony panels, with later timber infill. This is supported by wooden columns at the ground floor which stylistically date from an earlier period.

The external condition of the property is good.

=== Modifications and dates ===
External: Post 1930 brick addition to rear, balcony infilled, stable removed, intrusive plumbing on end walls.

== Heritage listing ==
As at 23 November 2000, this building dates from approximately 1840, although possibly earlier.

It is part of the Millers Point Conservation Area, an intact residential and maritime precinct. It contains residential buildings and civic spaces dating from the 1830s and is an important example of 19th century adaptation of the landscape.

21–23 Lower Fort Street, Millers Point was listed on the New South Wales State Heritage Register on 2 April 1999.

== See also ==
- Australian residential architectural styles
- Milton Terrace, 1–19 Lower Fort Street
- Linsley Terrace, 25–35 Lower Fort Street
