= 55–59 Harrington Street, The Rocks =

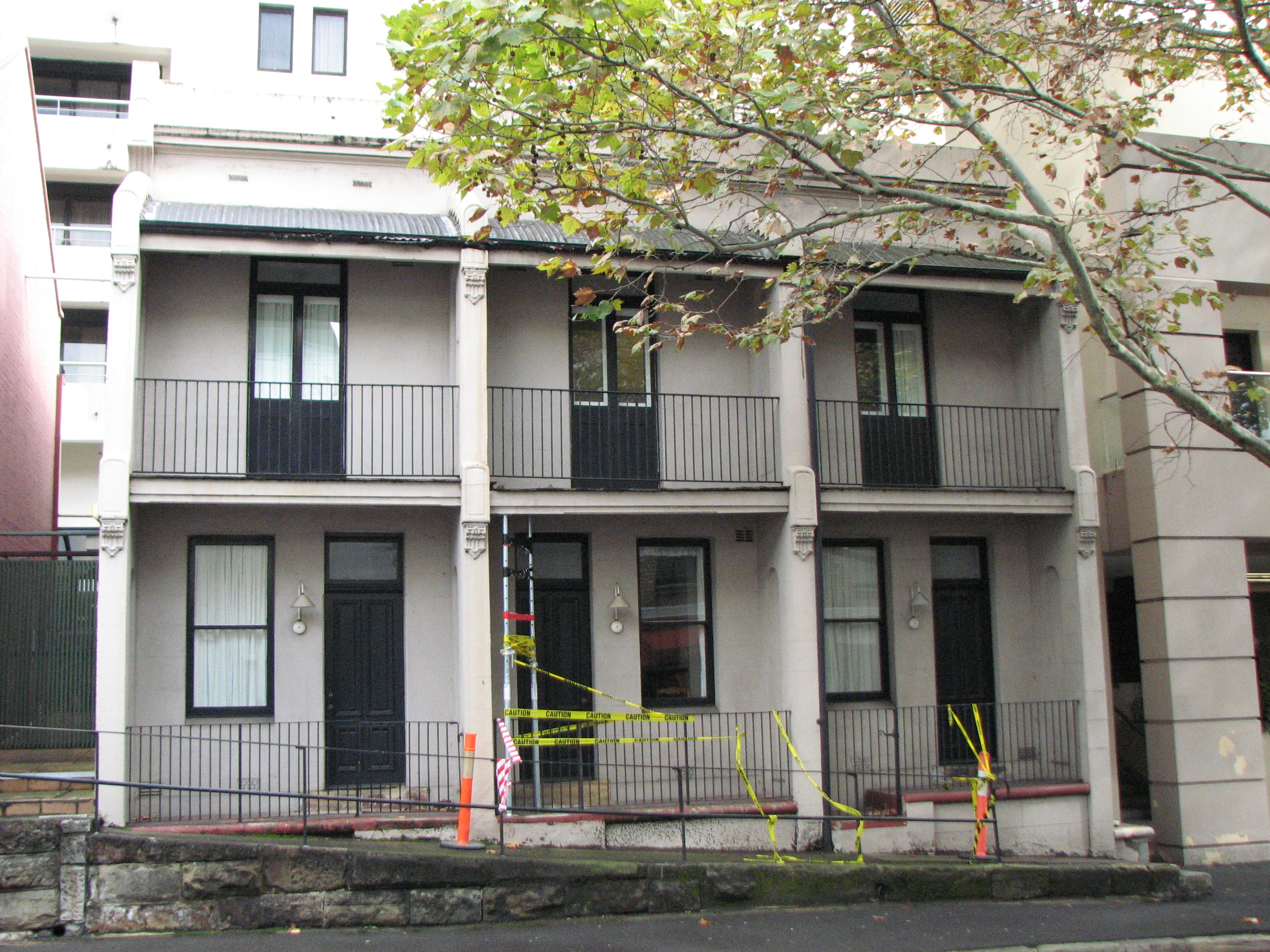
- 55–59 Harrington Street, The Rocks, New South Wales

- Location within Sydney Location within Australia
- 33.8597°S 151.2078°E
- Location: 55-59 Harrington Street, The Rocks, City of Sydney, New South Wales, Australia

History
- Built: 1886–

Site notes
- Owner: Sydney Harbour Foreshore Authority

New South Wales Heritage Register
- Official name: Terraces; Stafford Terrace; Stafford Apartments; 75 Harrington Street; Clocktower Devt.
- Type: state heritage (built)
- Designated: 10 May 2002
- Reference no.: 1610
- Type: Terrace
- Category: Residential buildings (private)

55–59 Harrington Street, The Rocks are heritage-listed serviced apartments and a former terrace house located at 55–59 Harrington Street, in the inner city Sydney suburb of The Rocks in the City of Sydney local government area of New South Wales, Australia. It was built from 1886. It is also known as Stafford Terrace; Stafford Apartments and 75 Harrington Street; Clocktower Development. The property is owned by Property NSW, an agency of the Government of New South Wales. It was added to the New South Wales State Heritage Register on 10 May 2002.

== History ==
In 1807 the site formed part of the garden of the Colony's hospital. After the formation of Harrington Street in 1810, a portion comprising 17 perches on the western side of the street was granted to a William Lea. The site was allotment 10 in Section 79 as show on an 1835 survey. By 1835, when the site was surveyed by Robert Russell, two buildings were located on the site. In 1845 the City Council assessed the northern building as a four-room brick house with shingled roof and the southern L-shaped building as a four-room stone house with shingled roof in bad repair. In relation to the condition of the northern house in 1863 the assessor commented that "part of (the) front (had) fallen down'. The 1865 trigonometrical survey shows the footprint of two houses on the site, which appear to indicate new development, when compared to the 1835 survey. Percy Dove's 1880 map shows a two-storey pair of terraces on the northern section, separated by a passage from the single storey shingled pair of cottages on the southern portion. The Lea family retained the property until c. 1885. In 1885 both buildings have been demolished and in c. 1886 a seven house, two storey terrace known as Stafford Terrace was constructed on the lot. In 1891 John Varley was assessed as proprietor of the land.

The land and buildings changed hands on at least two further occasions between 1871 and 1900, when the NSW Government resumed the land and buildings. The houses were tenanted as residential units. The name of "Stafford Terrace" first appeared in the 1890 Sand Directory, when the terraces were numbered as 9–21 Harrington Street. The numbering changed in 1924 to 47–59 Harrington Street. In 1940 the northern half (four houses) of the building was demolished to make way for the expanding meatworks complex on the corner of Harrington and Argyle Streets. The remaining houses were tenanted until the mid-1970s.

Entries in various Sands Directories indicate that in the late 19th century there was a large turnover of tenants in the terraces. In 1900 when the NSW Government resumed the land and buildings they were tenanted as residential units until the mid 1970s. After the 1900 Government resumption tenants spent an average of 6 to 8 years in the tenancy. Alfred W. Moore lived from 1902 to 1919 in 55 Harrington Street, which was numbered 17 Harrington Street in this period. Leslie Petersen was a tenant in 59 Harrington Street between 1919 and 1931 and moved to 55 Harrington Street in 1932, where he lived until his death in 1962. His wife, Mrs E. M. Petersen remained in the tenancy until 1973.

In the 1930s and 40s the terraces at 57 and 59 were shared tenancies, tenants paying £1/1/6 per week. Sydney Cove Authority tenancy records provide evidence of the everyday existential problems of tenants, noting a large turnover of tenants, endless rental arrears and requests for rental reduction. In February 1946 Leslie Peterson, long-term resident in 55 Harrington Street complained that "Building operations of Messrs Playfairs factory has deprived them of sunlight. Reduction of rental is sought to offset increased electricity consumption".

Tenancy records note a number of smaller refurbishments, repair and improvement, which the Maritime Services Board carried out on the terraces after 1927. The tenant's request for renovation and repair in the late 1940s and early 1950s indicate that by this time the terraces were in a rundown condition.

A comparison of the footprint of the terraces shown on the late-19th century survey map and the survey prepared for the site of the Clock Tower development in 1986 indicates a few changes to the configuration of the property, the most obvious being the loss of four terraces at the northern end of the group. The three southernmost terraces remain on the site. Minor changes included modification of the rear boundary line and remodelling of the single storey rear wing of the terraces.

During the redevelopment of the block in the 1980s the single storey rear sections of the terraces were demolished. The refurbishment also involved the re-roofing of the terraces, replacement of all floors, first floor in timber boarding and the ground floor in concrete and replacement of original features such as all stairs, fireplaces, doors and windows with replicated elements.

Due to the difficulty in housing building workers on the development site, the terraces were initially used as temporary accommodation until such time that sheds could be set up on concrete decks. The terrace is now part of the Clocktower Development designed by Michael Dysart, Architects, which comprises 55 serviced apartments, 35 shops, commercial office space and a car park, constructed 1986–89. The apartments are known as the Stafford Apartments, with the address, 75 Harrington Street.

Archaeology Notes: Buildings shown on this site in Russell's survey of January 1835. Partially occupied by a grant to W. A. B. Lea, of George and Liverpool Streets, of Lot 10, Section 79 of January 1840.

== Description ==
55–59 Harrington Street is a Victorian two storey terrace divided by pilasters into three houses. When constructed in c. 1886, the terrace consisted of seven houses and was known as "Stafford Terrace". The external elevation of painted brick is essentially plain capped by a curved parapet, its only decoration being a carved flower in the centre, and have first floor balconies and open lower verandahs. Windows are double hung, while doors are mainly of four panels with a plain fanlight above, and with four pane french doors to the first floor verandah. (from Collingridge 1978) It is understood that only the facades of the terrace were retained when the Stafford Apartments were built. The street numbers in this part of Harrington Street have been changed, as the address of Tourism House to the north is now No 55, and that of the Stafford Apartments is No 75 Harrington Street, and the street numbers have been removed from the properties which were Nos 55–71 Harrington Street.

Style: Victorian; Storeys: Two; Facade: Brick; Roof Cladding: Corrugated Iron (original). Archaeology is mostly intact.

=== Modifications and dates ===
- 1986/87: The iron on the roofs was replaced by slate, thought to be the original roofing material.

=== Further information ===
Further research should be undertaken on the date of construction of the building and the extent of original fabric remaining. There is no evidence that the underfloor deposits have been disturbed, leaving a possible archaeological resource.

== Heritage listing ==
As at 4 November 2008, The terraces at 55–59 Harrington Street are the three remaining components of Stafford Terrace that originally consisted of seven such residences. They are of State significance for their contribution to The Rocks area, which is of State heritage significance in its own right. The terraces are part of the 19th century housing stock of The Rocks and despite a number of alterations they retain an ability to demonstrate their original configuration and use. They are associated with the lower middle and working classes in residence in The Rocks between the late 1880s and the mid 1970s. The terraces demonstrate the typical design characteristics of the "standard" terrace type prevalent throughout Sydney in the mid- to late-19th century. They bear evidence of the way of life of the lower middle and working classes of the time period. The restored buildings enhance the human scale of the streetscape and reinforce the historic character of The Rocks and provide an accessible resource for interpretation and education for tourists in the heart of The Rocks.

Terraces was listed on the New South Wales State Heritage Register on 10 May 2002 having satisfied the following criteria.

The place is important in demonstrating the course, or pattern, of cultural or natural history in New South Wales.

The terraces are historically significant as they are indicative of the mid-nineteenth and early twentieth century residential nature of this quarter of The Rocks. The terraces are part of the 19th century housing stock of The Rocks and despite a number of alterations they retain an ability to demonstrate their original configuration and use. The item meets this criterion at a State level.

The place has a strong or special association with a person, or group of persons, of importance of cultural or natural history of New South Wales's history.

The terraces are associated with the lower middle and working classes in residence in The Rocks between the late 1880s and the mid 1970s. The remaining three terraces of the original Stafford Terraces have been part of the physical fabric of The Rocks since the 1880s. The item meets this criterion at a State level.

The place is important in demonstrating aesthetic characteristics and/or a high degree of creative or technical achievement in New South Wales.

The terraces have are an important part of a strong visual precinct forming a characteristic Rocks townscape, along with the adjacent terraces and the Harbour Rocks Hotel on the other side of the street. The restored terraces enhance the human scale of the streetscape and reinforce the historic character of the precinct. They are important in demonstrating the aesthetic characteristics of The Rocks. The item meets this criterion at a State level.

The place has a strong or special association with a particular community or cultural group in New South Wales for social, cultural or spiritual reasons.

The remaining three terraces of the original Stafford Terraces have been part of the physical fabric of The Rocks since the 1880s and are associated with the shifting populations and changing social demography of The Rocks. The item meets this criterion at a State level.

The place has potential to yield information that will contribute to an understanding of the cultural or natural history of New South Wales.

The stone ramp in front of the terraces serves as continuous reminder of the original topography of The Rocks peninsula. The restored terraces demonstrate the planning of a late-19th century terrace and the way of life of the lower middle and working classes of that period. They provide an accessible resource in the heart of The Rocks for interpretation and education for tourists and the local wider community. The item meets this criterion at a State level.

The place possesses uncommon, rare or endangered aspects of the cultural or natural history of New South Wales.

The terraces at 55–59 Harrington Street do not satisfy this criterion as there are no elements of the original built structures remaining that are capable of illustrating aspects of NSW's cultural or natural history that are uncommon, rare or endangered. The item meets this criterion at a State level.

The place is important in demonstrating the principal characteristics of a class of cultural or natural places/environments in New South Wales.

The terraces demonstrate the typical design characteristics of the "standard" terrace type prevalent throughout the inner suburbs of Sydney in the mid- to late-19th century.

== See also ==
- Australian residential architectural styles
