= 121 George Street, The Rocks =

Heritage-listed building in Sydney, Australia

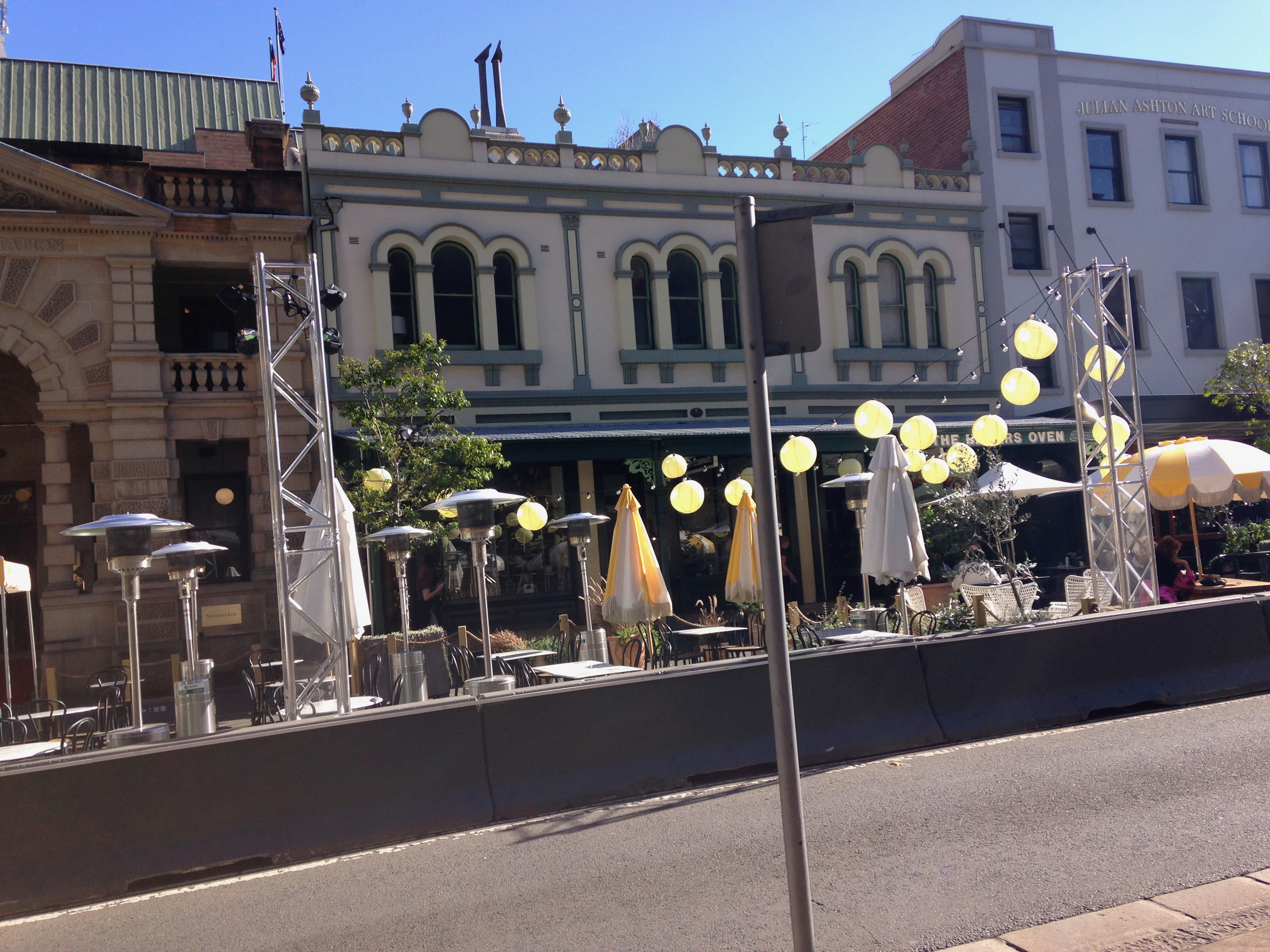
- 121 George Street, The Rocks is right hand building of the three terrace houses rendered in light green

- Location within Sydney Location within Australia
- 33.8600°S 151.2084°E
- Location: 121 George Street, The Rocks, City of Sydney, New South Wales, Australia

History
- Built: 1880
- Built for: Thomas Playfair

Site notes
- Architectural style: Victorian Free Classical
- Owner: Property NSW

New South Wales Heritage Register
- Official name: Shop and Residence – Bakers Oven; Baker's Oven – Shop and residence
- Type: State heritage (built)
- Designated: 10 May 2002
- Reference no.: 1588
- Type: Shop
- Category: Retail and Wholesale

121 George Street, The Rocks is a heritage-listed retail building and former terrace house and shops located at 121 George Street, in the inner city Sydney suburb of The Rocks in the City of Sydney local government area of New South Wales, Australia. It was built during 1880 for Thomas Playfair. It is also known as Baker's Oven – Shop and residence. The property is owned by Property NSW, an agency of the Government of New South Wales. It was added to the New South Wales State Heritage Register on 10 May 2002.

== History ==
The first major building constructed on the western side of George Street was the hospital by July 1788. Located on the block currently bounded by Globe, George and Argyle Streets, which includes the study site, the hospital was seen as being "well clear of town" at the time. A temporary prefabricated hospital was added in 1790 with the arrival of the Second Fleet. The hospital was upgraded to include three wings by 1802. The yard and gardens at the north of the hospital covered the study site.

=== Development by William Davis and family ===
The removal of the hospital building from its George Street location opened this land up for development. The site of No. 123-125 George Street was claimed by William Davis, who had arrived in the colony in February 1800 as an Irish exile. Davis was a blacksmith by trade and had been charged with supplying weapons (pikes) to the Irish uprising in 1798. Arriving in Sydney, he was assigned to work in the lumber yard after having received 200 lashes for his suspected involvement in a planned convict escape.

By 1809, Davis had left the lumber yard moving first to Parramatta, then returning to Sydney to live at Church Hill. Davis and his wife, Catherine, prospered in the new colony. By 1816, when the hospital closed, Davis was a successful publican and landholder, having a house at Church Hill and two properties in Parramatta. When the former hospital site became available in 1816, Davis acquired some of the land. This included the former northern wing of the hospital, which Davis converted into four separate houses. These dwellings stood on the site, adjacent to No. 121 George Street until the construction of the Police Station in the early 1880s. With four houses on his land, Davis was not compelled to develop his entire holding at once. A map from 1822 suggests that a quarry may have operated on part of the site. While Davis continued possession of the site, it was not until 1834 that his claim to the land was made official via a grant of 12 perches, made on 29 October by Governor Richard Bourke. Davis died in 1834.

The grandson of his brother John, John Davis, was appointed co-executor of Davis' estate with Father John McEncroe, the Catholic Priest at Church Hill, and John Dalley, who owned the property next to Davis' George Street tavern. John Davis took possession of the George Street property and built a house to the rear of it.

The George Street frontage remained clear during the ownership of both Davis and Henry Byrnes, who purchased the property around 1877. Byrnes was a waterman in Sydney, operating small boats to service the ships and ferry passengers and cargo between the ships and shore. In the tradition of the previous owners, Byrnes leased the property to be used by traders and store holders. In 1870, W. Hooper, a greengrocer, occupied No. 123 and T. Barry, bootmaker, occupied No. 125. The shops continued as a greengrocer, (J. Paddon) and a bootmaker (J. McAuley) until September 1881, when they and the rear buildings were pulled down.

=== Redevelopment by Thomas Playfair ===
Thomas Playfair had arrived in Sydney in 1859 as a sailor in the British Navy aboard the MHS Pelorus. He settled in Sydney after his discharge and went into a partnership with a local wholesale butcher, William Bailey. By 1862, Playfair was operating his own butchery in Lower George Street, providing meat to the ships that were moored in Sydney Cove. In this capacity, he quickly prospered in a lucrative market. In 1875, having lived in The Rocks for over ten years, Playfair was elected to the Sydney City Council as the member for the Gipps Ward, which he represented until a few months before his death in 1893. He served as Mayor of the city in 1885, and in 1889 he was elected to the Legislative Council as the Member for West Sydney, serving until 1891. As a successful merchant, Playfair began to expand his interests in property around The Rocks area, buying land and property.

In 1880, with the George Street frontage of No. 121 undeveloped, Henry Byrnes sold the land to Thomas Playfair. Playfair, who had also purchased the two blocks to the south, proceeded to develop the site. He erected a two-storey shop and dwelling fronting George Street with a single storey extension and outbuilding to the rear. In 1882, he built two other shops on the blocks of 123 and 125. The façade of these shops, executed in Victorian Free Classical Style was extended to include the front of No. 121 to create the shop front as it exists today. Paddon continued as a fruiterer in the new shop at No. 123, and C. W. Danielson, bookmaker in the other. Shop No. 125 became an outfitter and importer outlet in 1885. Playfair continued as landlord until the NSW Government resumed the property in 1900.

=== Acquisition by the NSW Government ===
In 1900, Sydney was subjected to a panic attack that accompanied the diagnosis of the bubonic plague in the city. One of the first cases was found to be in The Rocks, and public attention was focused on the area. The government response to the situation was to resume the entire Rocks and Darling Harbour area, an estimated 900 properties, including houses, shops, hotels, warehouses and wharves and including No. 121 George Street. To administer this area, the Government formed the Sydney Harbour Trust in 1902.

While this constituted a substantial change for the owners of the stores, many of the occupants stayed on after the changeover. From 1936, the premises were administered by the Maritime Services Board. In 1970 the Sydney Cove Redevelopment Authority was established to administer and redevelop The Rocks. Nos. 121-125 George Street were to be demolished but after community protest and Green Bans placed on the area many historic buildings were saved. In 1985 the Sydney Cove Authority was formed, and then in 1999 the Sydney Harbour Foreshore Authority was created to administer and protect the area, signalling a new appreciation of heritage in the area.

== Description ==
No. 121 George Street is a two-storey commercial property that appears as part of a row of three shops with the same facade design. In fact, No. 121 was built before Nos. 123-125, however the front facade was modified when its neighbours were built so that the property appeared as one. The street facade is designed in the Victorian Free Classical style that was typically used for commercial properties and whenever a veneer of respectability was sought. The classically inspired stucco detailing was applied to the rendered masonry wall allowing for the flexibility of decorative motifs without slowing the construction of the building.

Style: Victorian Free Classical Style; Storeys: 2; Roof Cladding: Corrugated iron; Floor Frame: Timber/vinyl and carpet finish; Ceilings: Plasterboard/lined with timber boards.

=== Condition ===
The exterior and interior of the building are in good condition. There is a continuing need for effective roof level maintenance to ensure the building is kept weather tight.

Archaeology Assessment Condition: Partly disturbed. Assessment Basis: Floors level with George Street, terraced up to former level of Nurses Walk. Recent building techniques (Bakehouse Place).

=== Modifications and dates ===
- 1882 – Facade modified to match those of 123 & 125, built in 1882.
- 1922 – An additional rear single-storey hipped rood structure was constructed as bakery incorporating a bakers oven and baking room.
- c. 1977 – The building was extensively renovated. The bakery addition was modified to accommodate a living room and bathroom for residential use. Further modifications have since been made to accommodate use of the building as a cafe and sandwich bar.
- 1982 – The street awning was reconstructed and the parapet reinstated.
- 1980s – The front façade was restored.

=== Further information ===
Nos. 121–125 George Street are included as a single listing on the (now defunct) Register of the National Estate and the non-statutory National Trust of Australia register.

== Heritage listing ==
As at 28 January 2009, No. 121 George Street is a representative example of a commercial building in the Victorian Free Classical style. It was built in 1880 by Thomas Playfair, as one of his investments in The Rocks area and has had a continual commercial use since it was built. The surviving fabric has the ability to yield information on early building techniques as well as the way of life for the inhabitants. The bakery is a rare surviving example of such a facility constructed in 1922, and is a fine example of the tools used for the application of a traditional skill. Although now partly removed, some of the peel brick oven survives including the iron doors, front wall to the oven and the associated tools allowing for interpretation as a traditional oven and bakery. The building is an integral part of the fabric of The Rocks showing the growth of the area and in particular the importance of the harbourside to the commercial precinct of The Rocks

Shop and Residence - Bakers Oven was listed on the New South Wales State Heritage Register on 10 May 2002 having satisfied the following criteria.

The place is important in demonstrating the course, or pattern, of cultural or natural history in New South Wales.

No. 121 George Street was built in 1880 as a commercial premise as part of the business precinct lining the harbour-side of The Rocks and is associated with the evolving pattern of urban fabric of the area. - The building is associated with Thomas Playfair, Mayor of Sydney in 1885. The building has had a continuous commercial use since it was built in 1880. The site retains elements of a combined shop/residence, once common throughout both the Rocks area and Sydney.

The place has a strong or special association with a person, or group of persons, of importance of cultural or natural history of New South Wales's history.

No. 121 George Street is associated with Thomas Playfair, Mayor of Sydney in 1885. Playfair was a butcher and invested in property in the local area, of which 121 George Street is one such property. The property is also associated with William Davis, an Irish convict who was instrumental in helping the Catholic Church establish itself in Sydney.

The place is important in demonstrating aesthetic characteristics and/or a high degree of creative or technical achievement in New South Wales.

The building's facade is a fine example of the Victorian Free Classical style, executed to give a sense of decorum to an otherwise simple commercial and residential structure. The building has streetscape value as one building in a group of three that were designed to appear as one property. The building's scale and alignment to the street are typical of that found along the business precinct of George Street in The Rocks area. The street façade has remained relatively intact since it was constructed in 1882.

The place has a strong or special association with a particular community or cultural group in New South Wales for social, cultural or spiritual reasons.

The building has had a continuous commercial use since it was built in 1880. It has been used as a hairdresser's, a tobacconist, a bakery and a small shop. Since 1977 it has been a sandwich shop known as The Baker's Oven. The site retains elements of a combined shop/residence, once common throughout both The Rocks and Sydney in general.

The place has potential to yield information that will contribute to an understanding of the cultural or natural history of New South Wales.

The fabric, although modified has the ability to yield information on the configuration of late Victorian commercial/residential buildings and aspects of the way of life of the people who inhabited them. Remnants of the baker's oven survive as an example of a peel brick oven including the associated baker's tool of timber peels and iron fire strokes. The site has the potential to contain subsurface archaeological deposits associated with the European occupation of the area.

The place possesses uncommon, rare or endangered aspects of the cultural or natural history of New South Wales.

The site has the potential to contain subsurface archaeological deposits associated with the early European occupation of the site and the surrounding area. Remnants of the baker's oven survive as an example of a peel brick oven including the associated baker's tool of timber peels and iron fire stokes.

The place is important in demonstrating the principal characteristics of a class of cultural or natural places/environments in New South Wales.

No. 121 George Street is representative of the nineteenth-century urban fabric that is found at The Rocks. It is a representative of a Victorian commercial property built in the Free Classical Style, and has been continuously occupied for commercial and retail purposes since construction in 1880. The building's scale and alignment to the street is typical of that found along the west side of George street and lining the harbourside as part of the business precinct of The Rocks. The building is part of the rich fabric of The Rocks which is highly regarded by residents, Sydney people and visitors and acknowledged by the Australian Heritage Commission and the National Trust as part of The Rocks Urban Conservation Area. The building at 121 George street is expressive of the close weaving of the social fabric of The Rocks area in the nineteenth century, by demonstrating the close links between the residential and commercial activities of the community.

== See also ==
- Australian residential architectural styles
