= 71 Harrington Street, The Rocks =

Building in suburban Sydney, Australia

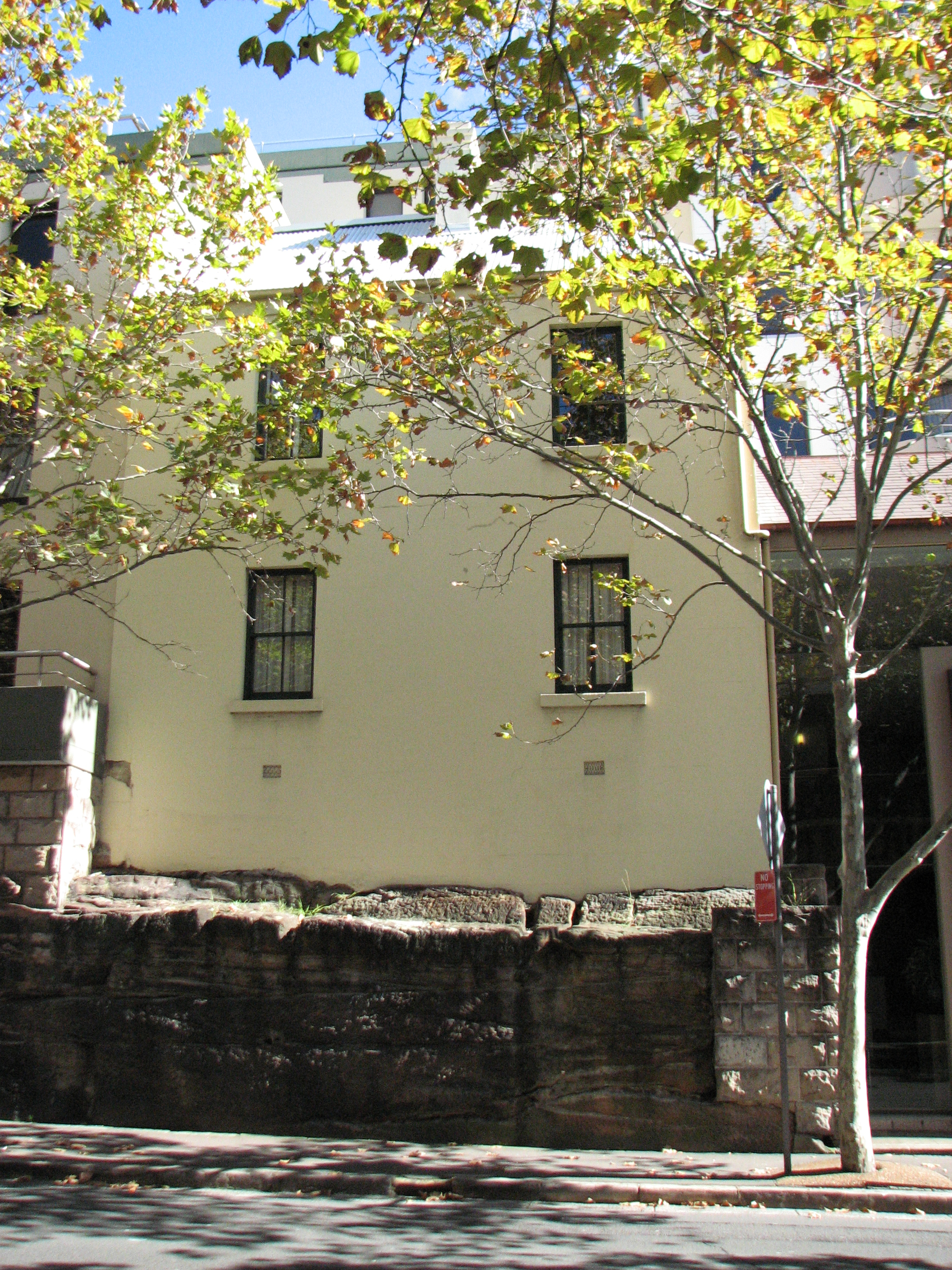
- 71 Harrington Street, The Rocks, New South Wales

- Location within Sydney Location within Australia
- 33.8600°S 151.2078°E
- Location: 71 Harrington Street, The Rocks, City of Sydney, New South Wales, Australia

History
- Built: 1860–

Site notes
- Owner: Property NSW

New South Wales Heritage Register
- Official name: House; Sailors Return Hotel; Stafford Apts.; 75 Harrington Street; Clocktower Development
- Type: State heritage (built)
- Designated: 10 May 2002
- Reference no.: 1551
- Type: House
- Category: Residential buildings (private)

71 Harrington Street, The Rocks are heritage-listed serviced apartments and former terrace houses and shops located at 71 Harrington Street, in the inner city Sydney suburb of The Rocks in the City of Sydney local government area of New South Wales, Australia. It was built from 1860. It is also known as Sailors Return Hotel; Stafford Apts. and 75 Harrington Street; Clocktower Development. The property is owned by Property NSW, an agency of the Government of New South Wales. It was added to the New South Wales State Heritage Register on 10 May 2002.

== History ==
The site, in 1807, was located to the west of the garden of the Colony's hospital. After the formation of Harrington Street a portion comprising 13 perches on the western side of the street was granted to a Claimant Thomas Weedon in November 1840. The site was allotment 8 in Section 79 as show on an 1835 survey. Weedon continued as landlord until a date between 1867 and 1871, when Frederick Oatley purchased the property. The 1835 survey map shows an L-shaped building located in the northern half of the site together with a substantial structure to the south. In 1845 the City Council assessed the northern section of the site as containing a two-room stone house with shingled roof. The two room stone house appears in the Rate Assessment books, described as a "very old building", until 1882, when no entry is recorded at this address. The 1891 rate assessment notes Oatley and Cahill as the owners of the site. Oatley remained the owner until c. 1895, when E. B. McKenny became proprietor. The site appears to have remained vacant until c. 1896, when a building, rated as a two-storey house, was constructed for E. B. McKenny.

The house first appeared in the 1898 Sands Directory, when it was known as 33 Harrington Street. It was rated as a shop, and was occupied by a George Jones. The numbering changed to 71 Harrington Street in 1924.

In December 1900 Harrington Street was resumed by the NSW Government as part of Section 8 Observatory Hill lands, component of section 79 City of Sydney. Entries in various Sands Directories indicate that George Jones operated a lodging house at 33 Harrington Street between 1903 and 1918. In 1919 and 1920 Mrs Mary Jones managed the establishment. In the 1920s and 30s there was a large turnover of tenants in the building, tenants paying £1/7/6 per week in the 1920s and £1/9/6 per week in the 1930s. SCA tenancy records provide evidence of the everyday existential problems of tenants, noting endless rental arrears and requests for rental reduction or transfer to cheaper premises. In February 1937 George Henry Johnson signed the tenancy contract for the premises. Johnson and his family remained tenant at 71 Harrington Street until 1973, paying £1/5/0 per week in 1937, £2/16/0 in 1957 and $20 in 1973. Sydney Cove Authority records note rental arrears and indebtedness of G. H. Johnson a number of times during the 36 years of his tenancy.

Tenancy records note a number of smaller repair and improvement and the tenant's request "to have the hall and kitchen renovated" and "to have gas store connected" (1944). In 1946 Johnson asked the "Board to build verandah or porch" and applied "for a new entrance be made from the residence to Harrington Street". The tenant's request for renovation and repairs indicate that in the 1960s the building was in a run-down condition. The building was vacant for at least ten years then in the late-1980s it was redeveloped as part of the Clock Tower development.

During the redevelopment of the block in the 1980s the rear section of the house at 71 Harrington Street was demolished. The 1986 plan below indicates that half of the rear portion and the chimney stack were removed and a single brick wall built at the western end of the house. Some of the existing internal walls were removed, two doorways were bricked up and new doors and a window were fitted into existing walls at both levels. The architectural character of the street façade and the general roof form together with the noteworthy chimney were retained, but the original house lost its size, mass and form, with much of its original fabric modified. The refurbishment involved the re-roofing of the buildings, replacement of floors and replacement of original features such as fireplaces, doors and windows with sympathetic replicated elements. While the house was modified, it generally still presents as intact when viewed from Harrington Street.

== Description ==
71 Harrington Street was constructed c. 1895. Originally rated as a "shop" it later became a "lodging house" and, finally, a house. As far it is known the original roof was of corrugated iron.

Storeys: Two; Facade: Brick and render; Roof Cladding: Iron.

=== Condition ===
As at 27 April 2001, Archaeology Assessment Condition: Partly disturbed. Assessment Basis: Area under building only. Terraced into hill slope.

=== Modifications and dates ===
- 1986/87: The facade of the building was restored as part of the Clocktower development. The iron on the roof was replaced.

== Heritage listing ==
As at 30 March 2011, this house and site are of State heritage significance for their historical and scientific cultural values. The site and building are also of State heritage significance for their contribution to The Rocks area which is of State Heritage significance in its own right.

The site has historical significance as part of the Colony's hospital site in 1807, and the building as part of the 19th century housing stock in The Rocks. It has aesthetic significance as part of a strong visual precinct of buildings with Nos. 55-69 and Nos. 42-52 and the Harbour Rocks Hotel on the other side of the street, and with the buildings at 39-47 Argyle Street.

Originally built in the 1890s, the house at 71 Harrington Street provided accommodation for the lower middle and working classes in residence in The Rocks until the mid-1970s. In the late-1980s the rear section of the house was demolished and the retained portion became incorporated into the serviced apartment building of the Clock Tower development. The building lost its identity and ability to demonstrate its original configuration and use. The retained street section, however, enhances the human scale of the streetscape. Together with the adjacent terraces it forms a strong visual precinct, contributing to the characteristic Rocks townscape.

House was listed on the New South Wales State Heritage Register on 10 May 2002 having satisfied the following criteria.

The place is important in demonstrating the course, or pattern, of cultural or natural history in New South Wales.

Originally built in the 1890s, the house at 71 Harrington Street provided accommodation of the lower middle and working classes in residence in The Rocks until the mid-1970s The remaining portion of the house at 71 Harrington Street has historic significance as part of the 19th century housing stock in The Rocks. The site has historical significance as part of the Colony's hospital site in 1807, and the building as part of the 19th century housing stock in The Rocks. The item meets this criterion at State level.

The place has a strong or special association with a person, or group of persons, of importance of cultural or natural history of New South Wales's history.

The house is associated with the residential life-styles of the lower middle and working classes in residence in The Rocks between the 1890s and the mid 1970s.

The place is important in demonstrating aesthetic characteristics and/or a high degree of creative or technical achievement in New South Wales.

The retained section of the house has aesthetic significance as part of a strong visual precinct forming a characteristic Rocks townscape with the adjacent terraces and the Harbour Rocks Hotel on the other side of the street. The retained street section of the former house enhances the human scale of the streetscape and reinforces the historic character of The Rocks. The item meets this criterion at State level.

The place has a strong or special association with a particular community or cultural group in New South Wales for social, cultural or spiritual reasons.

The cottages contribute strongly to the character of The Rocks heritage precinct which is highly valued by the contemporary community in Sydney and by visitors from elsewhere in Australia and overseas. This is evidenced by the listing on the National Trust Register

The place has potential to yield information that will contribute to an understanding of the cultural or natural history of New South Wales.

The sandstone cliff face at the street frontage serves as continuous remainder of the original ragged topography of The Rocks peninsula. The item does not meet this criterion at either State or local level.

The place possesses uncommon, rare or endangered aspects of the cultural or natural history of New South Wales.

There are no historic features of the place that exhibit an uncommon, rare or endangered aspect of NSW's cultural or natural history. The item does not meet this criterion at either State or local level.

== See also ==
- Australian residential architectural styles
