= Reynolds' Cottages =

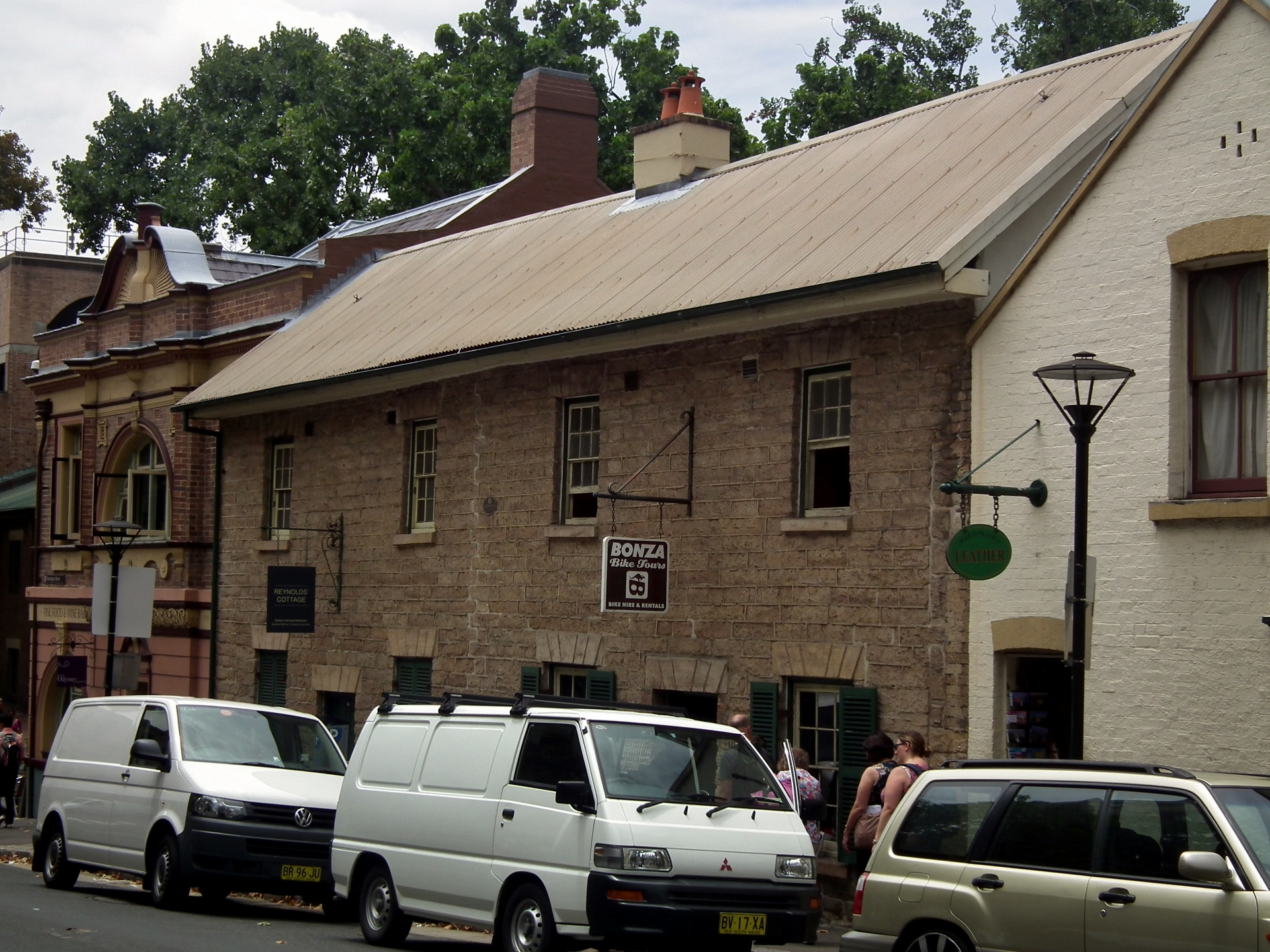
- Reynolds' Cottages, pictured in 2014

- Location within Sydney Location within Australia
- 33.8594°S 151.2082°E
- Location: 28–30 Harrington Street, The Rocks, City of Sydney, New South Wales, Australia

History
- Built: 1830
- Built for: Thomas Ryan

Site notes
- Architectural style: Colonial Georgian
- Owner: Sydney Harbour Foreshore Authority

New South Wales Heritage Register
- Official name: Reynolds's Cottages; currently Gumnut Cafe (No. 28).
- Type: State heritage (built)
- Designated: 10 May 2002
- Reference no.: 1573
- Type: Cottage
- Category: Residential buildings (private)

Reynolds's Cottages is a heritage-listed former retail building and residence and now retail building and cafe at 28–30 Harrington Street, The Rocks, City of Sydney, New South Wales, Australia. It was built for Thomas Ryan in 1830. It is also known as Gumnut Cafe (No. 28). The property is owned by Property NSW, an agency of the Government of New South Wales. It was added to the New South Wales State Heritage Register on 10 May 2002.

== History ==
It is believed that the cottages were built between 1823 and 1829 on the site that had previously been the garden of the Assistant Surgeons House, for Thomas Ryan. Originally one room deep, they were purchased by William Reynolds in 1830. The dwellings were constructed as simple working class buildings, however, due to the abundance of local sandstone, most of the housing for the working classes was built in stone.

William Reynolds of Harrington Street is listed as a ship smith in the 1836-1840 Magistrates Returns. Due to housing shortages, Reynolds built a number of small, poor standard houses in the vicinity including five in the courtyard behind the cottages between 1839 and 1841 (subsequently demolished in the 1880s). This area gained a reputation in the 1850s - 90s as the haunt of criminals and prostitutes. During the 1891 Royal Commission into Chinese Gambling, Immorality and Police Corruption, it was noted that an opium den existed in one of the dwellings in the courtyard. The rear brick addition to No. 30 was added in the 1850s, the east wall constructed over an earlier well.

Sydney Council's first rate assessment in 1845 indicates that Reynolds' children retained ownership of the property and others in the area and rented out the five houses hereon. No. 28 and No. 30 were described at this time as two, two-storey stone-and-shingled houses, each with four rooms and the necessary outhouses. No. 32 differed, as it was constructed in timber.

It would appear that the building continued to be tenanted, however, in July 1850, the Reynolds' mortgaged the Harrington Street premises to John Brown Esquire. This was subsequently surrendered and a second mortgage registered. In an indenture dated 12 November 1857, made between Maurice and Margaret Reynolds and Charles E. Langley and George Stabler, the mortgage was discharged.

On his death in 1860, the Harrington Street premises formed part of the insolvent estate of Maurice Reynolds of Burwood. The property included a house and adjoining land facing George Street and various small brick and stone houses in Reynolds Lane (now the Suez Canal). In 1863 the latter were described as unoccupied and according to the 1863 Assessment Book, "much out of repair".

Land title documents indicate that Margaret Reynolds retained ownership of the property at this time, however re-mortgaged to Langley and Stabler following the death of her brother in 1861, and to John Blaxland and George Stabler on the death of Charles Langley in 1864. In an indenture dated 28 November 1870, Margaret finally conveyed her interest in the property, Allotment 2 of Section 84 with all buildings thereon, to John Blaxland and George Stabler and their heirs. Further confusion arose, as according to the Assessment Books, William Scoles was recorded as the owner of No. 28-32 Harrington Street in 1867, however all the land title records up to this time give no mention of a William Scoles. The three properties were in turn passed to Elizabeth E. Stabler and John Blaxland following the death of George Stabler in 1873.

From the 1860s, the Sands Directory indicates that the houses were occupied by several long term tenants. John Scoles (assume also Skulls in 1866 listing), noted as being a labourer, carter and a porter, is listed at No. 4 (No. 28) from 1866 until 1875, when a Joseph Day is listed at No. 4. Day, a mariner, had resided at No. 6 (No. 30) since 1866 and remained at No. 28 until 1879 at which time his wife Mary Ann is recorded as laundress and lessee. Mrs Day remained at No. 28 until 1882, when an Edward Day is listed, staying until 1895. No. 8 (No. 32) appears to have been operated continuously as grocery until 1880, when a bookbinder took up residence.

In 1877 the properties were once again transferred, to George Rattray and William Henry Mackenzie as tenants in common. They retained ownership until 1884, when a Patrick Fahey purchased the properties. According to the Sands, Fahey, a grocer, had occupied No. 32 since 1882. He reinstated the grocery store and is listed at No. 32 until 1907 and continued to lease No. 28 and No. 30 to various tenants. At the turn of the century the plague hit Sydney and resulted in widespread cleansing and demolition in the older, more established parts of the city such as The Rocks. Fahey retained ownership of the properties until 1900, when notification of resumption was served.

In 1901 the Sydney Harbour Trust was established to maintain and manage the area resumed by the Government. The Sands Directory indicates that the buildings remained continuously tenanted, with only short periods of vacancy. The area had long been associated with the lower classes and by this time had been transformed from industrial middle class occupancy to an area which had a reputation for crime and poor living conditions.

In 1909 a Royal Commission for the Improvement of the City of Sydney recommended that Harrington Street, among others in The Rocks, be widened and straightened. It is not clear when, however, the level of Harrington Street was raised. This in turn necessitated the addition of two (descending) steps in the entrance of No. 30.

In the early 1930s, the Maritime Services Board replaced the Sydney Harbour Trust as the landlords of The Rocks. Tenancy cards, dating from 1927, show that the buildings continued to be maintained and occupied by various tenants.

The Sydney Cove Redevelopment Authority (SCRA) was established in 1970, took responsibility and leased the buildings. The buildings continued to provide residential accommodation, however a shift away from residential use, to commercial use occurred during the next decade. In 1976 a shop selling old wares commenced operation in No. 28, with an associated tea room following in 1978. The Gumnut Tea Garden, began operation in No. 28 in c. 1982. Nos. 30 and 32 retained residential tenants until 1984, and have subsequently been occupied by retail shops.

=== The well ===
It is unclear when the well was dug. Originally the land was part of the gardens behind the Assistant Surgeons House (incorrectly referred to as Assistant Surveyor on Meehan's survey of 1807). No wells are recorded on that plan, or on any other in the vicinity of the subject site. Wells were usually not recorded on maps and plans, so this is not an indication that it was not built at the time of Meehan's survey in 1807. There is no record of a structure on the subject site until c. 1830 when Reynolds built the one room cottages, possibly between 1823 and 1829. It is very likely that the well was dug during this period.

Archaeological evidence suggests that the well was built in the first half of the nineteenth century. It contained artefacts that date before 1850 when the cottages were extended. Rooms were added to the back of the cottages at this time and two toilets erected over the well.

The well was excavated by archaeologists in 1987 and in 1989-90 the rear yard and the subfloor of No. 30 as part of works to provide sub-floor ventilation and services for the site unearthed possible evidence of cock fighting and dog baiting - the latter using live cats.

== Description ==
The facade of Nos. 28–30 Harrington Street typifies the symmetry and order of the Colonial Georgian style. The gabled roof, covered by galvanised iron sheeting and a shared brick chimney stack, centres the cottages. The walls are made of coarse sandstone rubble with raised pointing to simulate ashlar. There is clear evidence that these two cottages were built in separate stages due to the way the stone has been toothed at the party wall. Each cottage has a centrally placed entrance door of a simple, four panelled design with a brass door knob. It is flanked on either side by one six panel sash window with shutters, surmounted by a flat stone lintel. There are identical windows on the first floor above.

Style: Simple Georgian; Storeys: Two; Facade: Dressed sandstone; Internal Walls: Brick; Roof Cladding: Shingled (original) Corrugated iron (present); Floor Frame: Timber

The well is in the rear yard of 30 Harrington Street. The top of the well has been restored in original stone, with the introduced brick courses placed around the well at a later date in a funnel shape leading to the original top of the well. Half this structure lays under the rear wall of 30 Harrington Street and it is enclosed by an iron railing fence for its and the public's protection. The top of the well is sealed.

=== Condition ===
As at 24 February 2000, No. 28 is in need of some conservation work.

Archaeology Assessment Condition: Minor disturbance. Assessment Basis: Floors level with street. The demolition and reconstruction of the rear wall of this premises revealed a well over which had been constructed two toilets by the 1850s. Investigation: Excavation. The cottage at No. 28 Harrington Street is particularly intact demonstrating its development from 1823 to 1860. Archaeology minor disturbance.

=== Modifications and dates ===
- c. 1830 – A solid two storey Georgian stone structure with a brick and skillion addition to the rear facade.
- Post 1840 – A two-storey extension to the rear facade was built with new internal access to the top floor in No. 30.
- 1989–91 – No. 30 was renovated.

The Well

It is unclear when the well was dug. Artefacts excavated from the well suggest it was built before the mid 19th century. Two toilets were constructed over the well by the 1850s. The rear wall of 30 Harrington Street was demolished and reconstructed revealing the existence of the well and it was subject to archaeological investigation and excavation in 1987.

== Heritage listing ==
As at 29 January 2009, Reynolds' Cottages and site are of State heritage significance for their historic and scientific cultural values. The site and building are also of State heritage significance for their contribution to The Rocks area which is of State Heritage significance in its own right. The cottages are of State significance as rare examples of small scale Colonial Georgian architecture. The building fabric significantly retains evidence of its early use and configuration and simple accommodation which reflects the early living standards and utilitarian nature of the industrial middle class, during the 19th century and lower classes through to the 20th century.

The cottages significantly retain fabric from its initial construction, additions in the 1850s and development stages since. The cottages also retain a sense of its original configuration and Colonial Georgian features and demonstrate the use and range of 19th-century building techniques and materials and illustrate changes in workmanship. The buildings form part of diverse and eclectic streetscape, and make a positive contribution to the Harrington Street streetscape. Together with No. 32 they form part of a grouping that contributes strongly to the historical character of The Rocks Heritage Precinct which is highly valued by the local community and visitors alike.

The well at the rear of 30 Harrington Street is historically significant because it demonstrates early water supply technology and also later waste disposal. It demonstrates aspects of early lifestyle that have all but disappeared today. The brick lined well is characteristic of the older settlement in this area, representing a need for a reliable source of water. It indicates the continuity of settlement in the area. The well is associated with early settlers in the area including the convict blacksmith William Reynolds. The well and its artefacts hold research potential in their ability to increase knowledge about early lifestyle in this area.

Reynolds's Cottages was listed on the New South Wales State Heritage Register on 10 May 2002 having satisfied the following criteria.

The place is important in demonstrating the course, or pattern, of cultural or natural history in New South Wales.

The site is significant as it represents the development of The Rocks area from the 1820s to the 1990s. The cottages reflect the utilitarian nature of the early dwellings in area and subsequent changes represent the changing social and economic climate of the area and of the various occupants and owners. The site also retains evidence of earlier occupation such as the well and large archaeological resource. Reynolds' Cottages are historically significant as rare examples of small scale, Colonial Georgian architecture. They are two of the oldest surviving dwellings in The Rocks, only Cadman's Cottage predates them. The physical fabric of the cottages significantly retains evidence of the modest beginning of the industrial middle class and the demographic shift of the area with low working class occupation through the 19th and 20th centuries. The shift away from residential to commercial use in the late 1970s records the changing social and economic values of this area in particular.

The well at the rear of 30 Harrington Street is historically significant because it demonstrates early water supply technology and also later waste disposal. It demonstrates aspects of early lifestyle that have all but disappeared today. The brick lined well is characteristic of the older settlement in this area, representing a need for a reliable source of water. It indicates the continuity of settlement in the area.

The place has a strong or special association with a person, or group of persons, of importance of cultural or natural history of New South Wales's history.

The site is associated with Colonial Architect, Francis Greenway and the Terry family, notable colonial land owners. The buildings are associated with William Reynolds and his children and other local land owners such as Michael Gannon, who lived in Argyle Street and constructed the Hotel on the corner of George and Argyle Streets. The buildings are associated with a number tenants and occupants of no particular note.

The place is important in demonstrating aesthetic characteristics and/or a high degree of creative or technical achievement in New South Wales.

The cottages are a good and largely intact example of small scale Colonial Georgian architecture which is now rare in Sydney. The cottages significantly retain fabric from their initial construction, additions in the 1850s and development stages since. The cottages also retain a sense of their original configuration and Colonial Georgian features.

The buildings form part of diverse and eclectic streetscape, and make a positive contribution to the Harrington Street streetscape. Together with No. 32 they form part of a unified grouping. The site and building provide accessible interpretation opportunities for the general public and tourists in the heart of The Rocks. The buildings face an open courtyard and are visible from and accessed by a network of pedestrian thoroughfares and passages which enhance and contribute to its aesthetic character and appreciation. The laneways and thoroughfares are historically and aesthetically significant. Dating from the 1820s, they remain in their original positions

The place has a strong or special association with a particular community or cultural group in New South Wales for social, cultural or spiritual reasons.

The cottages contribute strongly to the character of The Rocks Heritage Precinct which is highly valued by the local community and visitors alike.

The place has potential to yield information that will contribute to an understanding of the cultural or natural history of New South Wales.

The cottages and open courtyard to their east are of high technological significance and high archaeological potential as they retain evidence of the early and subsequent occupation and use of the site and immediate area. The cottages significantly retain evidence of the various phases of construction and development which demonstrates the range of 19th and 20th century building techniques and materials and demonstrate the changes in contemporary building fabrics and workmanship. The well and its artefacts hold research potential in their ability to increase knowledge about early lifestyle in this area.

The place possesses uncommon, rare or endangered aspects of the cultural or natural history of New South Wales.

The cottages at nos 28- 30 Harrington Street are two of the oldest surviving dwellings in The Rocks and only Cadman's Cottage survives to pre-date them. They are also one of the rare examples of small scale Colonial Georgian architecture to be found in Sydney.

The place is important in demonstrating the principal characteristics of a class of cultural or natural places/environments in New South Wales.

The cottages are of State significance as they demonstrate early living standards, No. 28 in particular demonstrates its development from 1823 to 1860.

== See also ==
- Australian residential architectural styles
- 32 Harrington Street
