= 67 Harrington Street, The Rocks =

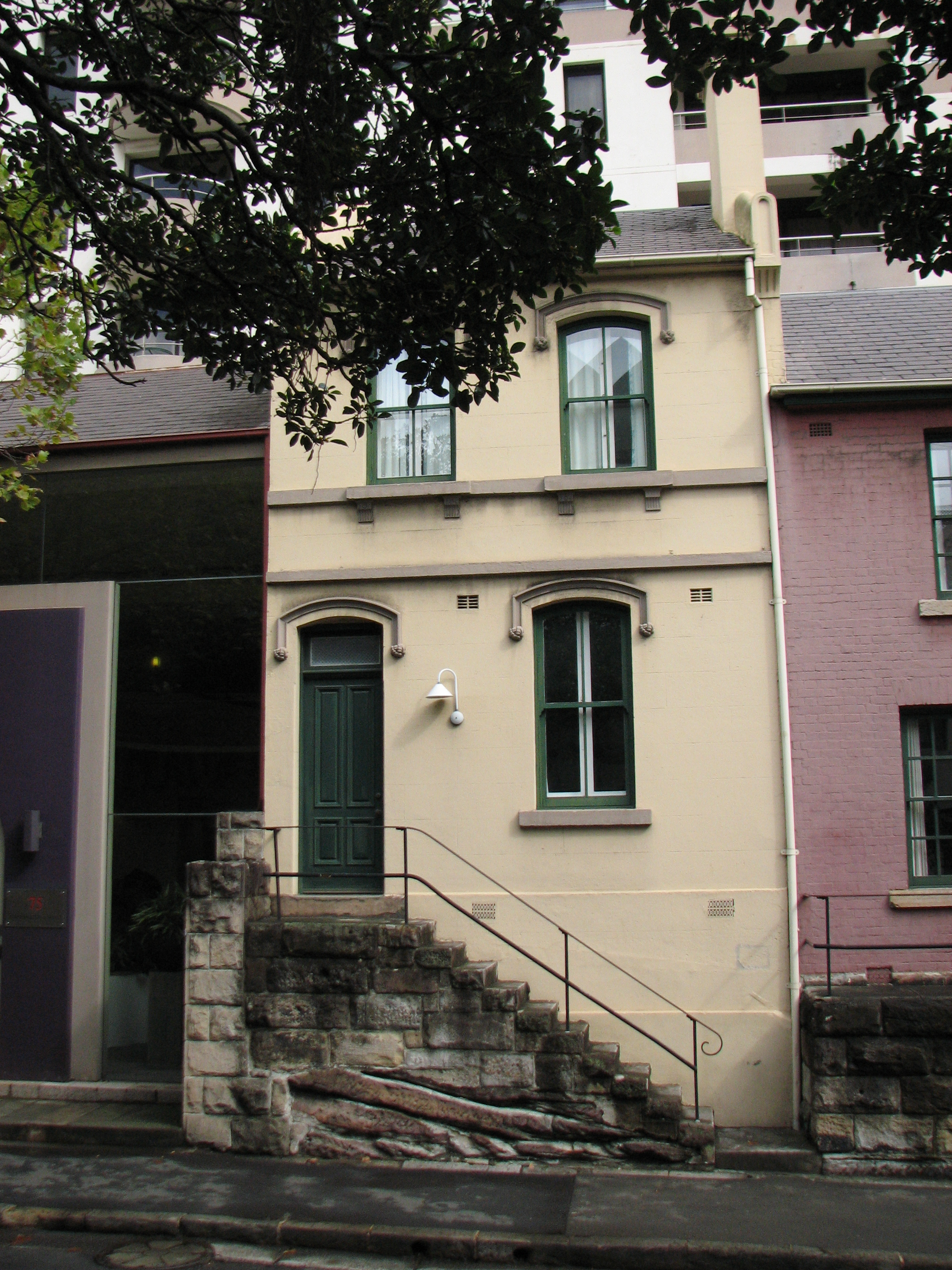
- 67 Harrington Street, The Rocks, New South Wales

- Location within Sydney Location within Australia
- 33.8599°S 151.2078°E
- Location: 67 Harrington Street, The Rocks, City of Sydney, New South Wales, Australia

History
- Built: 1885–

Site notes
- Owner: Property NSW

New South Wales Heritage Register
- Official name: Terrace; Stafford Apartments; 75 Harrington Street; Clocktower Development.
- Type: State heritage (built)
- Designated: 10 May 2002
- Reference no.: 1603
- Type: Terrace
- Category: Residential buildings (private)

67 Harrington Street, The Rocks is a heritage-listed serviced apartments complex and former terrace house located at 67 Harrington Street, in the inner city Sydney suburb of The Rocks in the City of Sydney local government area of New South Wales, Australia. It was built from 1885. It is also known as Stafford Apartments and 75 Harrington Street; Clocktower Development. The property is owned by Property NSW, an agency of the Government of New South Wales. It was added to the New South Wales State Heritage Register on 10 May 2002.

== History ==
Between 1788 and 1816, the site which is now 67 Harrington Street formed part of the garden of the Colony's Hospital. When the hospital was moved in 1815, and development occurred around the property, this site remained undeveloped until the late 1880s, apart from a stable and other out buildings. By contrast, other blocks along the street, such as the adjacent block to the north (now 61–65 Harrington Street) were built on.

The site had formerly been part of a large allotment extending to Cumberland Place granted to Thomas Weedon. Weedon continued as landlord until a date between 1867 and 1871, when Fredrick Oatley purchased the allotment. Around 1885, a two-storey rendered brick terrace was erected. This terrace adjoined numbers 61–65 Harrington Street. At this time, 67 Harrington Street was known as number 17 Harrington Street. In 1889 the number was changed to 29 Harrington Street. In 1891 the site was owned by Oatley and Cahill and is recorded as having six rooms with a slate roof. Oately remained the owner until c. 1895 when E. B. McKenny became the proprietor.

In December 1900, Harrington Street was resumed by the NSW NSW Government as part of a Section 8 Observatory Hill lands, component of section 79 City of Sydney.

In 1924 the numbering was changed to 67 Harrington Street; and it remained in residential use until 1978. The building is now part of the Clocktower Development designed by Michael Dysart, Architects, which comprises 55 serviced apartments, 35 shops, commercial office space and a car park constructed in 1986–89. The apartments are known as the Stafford Apartments.

== Description ==
No 67 Harrington Street is a two-storey Victorian house, plastered and painted, set high on a rock base above the street and adjoins the terraces at Nos 61-65 Harrington Street. The detailing is simple, with moulded arches and label stops to windows and doors. The first floor windows rest on corbels. The steeply pitched roof is covered with corrugated iron.

Style: Victorian Terrace; Storeys: Two; Facade: Brick, cement render; Roof Cladding: Iron. Potential archaeological resource.

=== Modifications and dates ===
- 1986/87: The facades of the building was restored as part of the Clocktower development. The iron on the roof was replaced by slate, thought to be the original roofing material.

Further research should be undertaken on the date of construction of the building and the extent of original fabric remaining. There is no evidence to suggest that the underfloor deposits for this building have been disturbed, leaving a possible archaeological resource.

== Heritage listing ==
As at 31 March 2011, this terrace and site are of State heritage significance for their historical and scientific cultural values. The site and building are also of State heritage significance for their contribution to The Rocks area which is of State Heritage significance in its own right. The site has historical significance as part of the Colony's hospital site in 1807, and the building as part of the 19th century housing stock in The Rocks. It has aesthetic significance as part of a strong visual precinct of buildings with Nos. 55–65 & 71 and Nos. 42–52 Harrington Street and the Harbour Rocks Hotel on the other side of the street, and also relates to the buildings at 39–47 Argyle Street. There is a potential archaeological resource remaining in the underfloor area of this site with significant research value into the hospital garden and subsequent site development. This has the potential to add to knowledge about the history of settlement in this area, the earliest European settlement in Australia.

Terrace was listed on the New South Wales State Heritage Register on 10 May 2002 having satisfied the following criteria.

The place is important in demonstrating the course, or pattern, of cultural or natural history in New South Wales.

This terrace and site are of State heritage significance for their historical and scientific cultural values. The site and building are also of State heritage significance for their contribution to The Rocks area which is of State Heritage significance in its own right. The site has historical significance as part of the Colony's hospital site in 1807, and the building as part of the 19th century housing stock in The Rocks. It has aesthetic significance as part of a strong visual precinct of buildings with Nos 55–65 & 71 and Nos 42–52 Harrington Street and the Harbour Rocks Hotel on the other side of the street, and also relates to the buildings at 39–47 Argyle Street.

The place has potential to yield information that will contribute to an understanding of the cultural or natural history of New South Wales.

There is a potential archaeological resource remaining in the underfloor area of this site with significant research value into the hospital garden and subsequent site development. This has the potential to add to knowledge about the history of settlement in this area, the earliest European settlement in Australia. The Rocks is an archaeologically sensitive area, and there is potential at this site for archaeological features and deposits from all stages of development and while evidence from the hospital phase is likely to be ephemeral and possibly disturbed, it would be of State significance.

== See also ==
- Australian residential architectural styles
