= 61–65 Harrington Street, The Rocks =

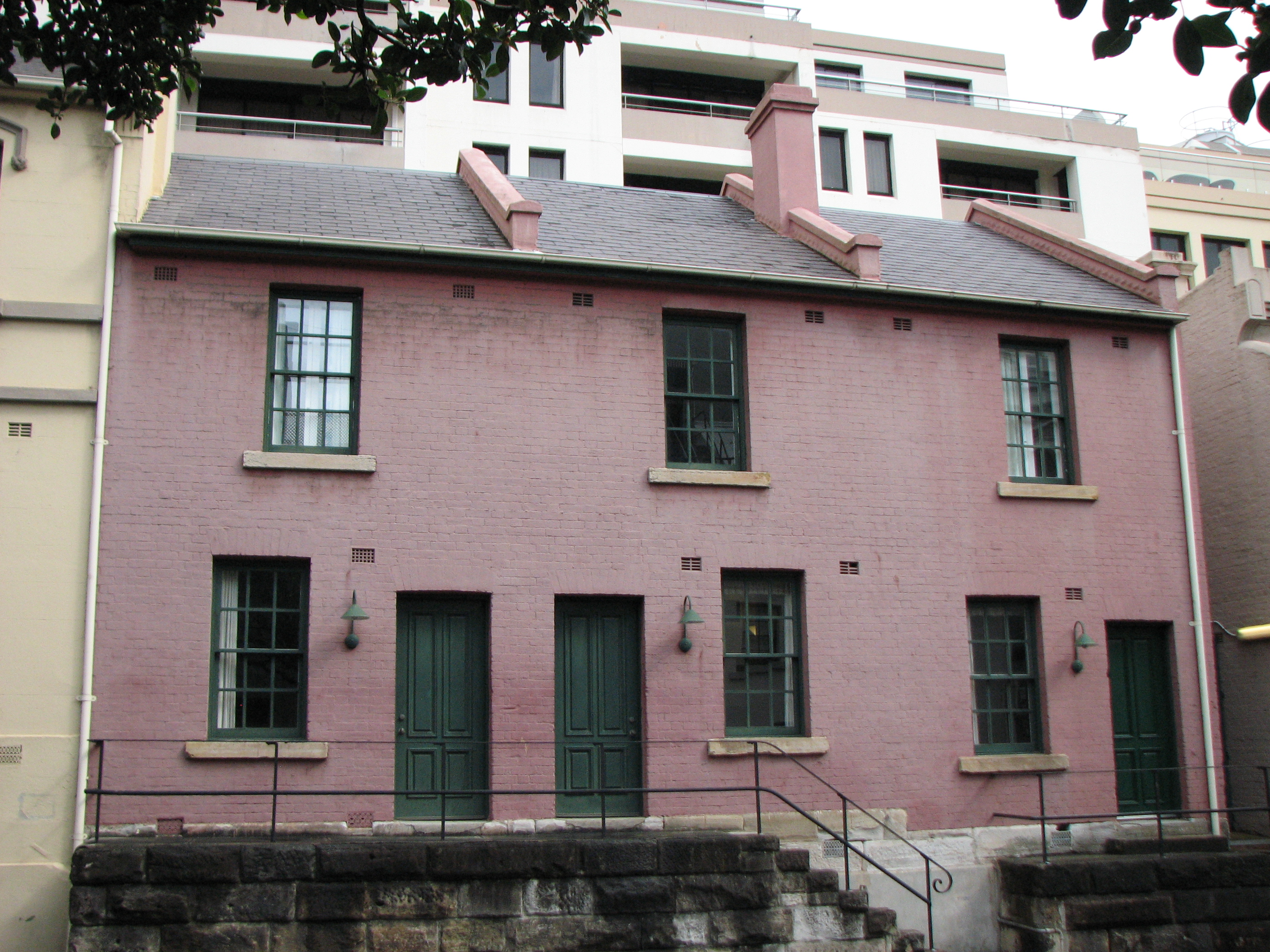
- 61–65 Harrington Street, The Rocks, New South Wales

- Location within Sydney Location within Australia
- 33.8598°S 151.2078°E
- Location: 61-65 Harrington Street, The Rocks, City of Sydney, New South Wales, Australia

History
- Built: 1870–

Site notes
- Owner: Property NSW

New South Wales Heritage Register
- Official name: Terrace; Stafford Apartments; 75 Harrington Street; Clocktower Development.
- Type: State heritage (built)
- Designated: 10 May 2002
- Reference no.: 1602
- Type: Terrace
- Category: Residential buildings (private)

61–65 Harrington Street, The Rocks is a heritage-listed serviced apartments and former terrace house located at 61–65 Harrington Street, in the inner city Sydney suburb of The Rocks in the City of Sydney local government area of New South Wales, Australia. It was built from 1870. It is also known as Stafford Apartments and 75 Harrington Street; Clocktower Development. The property is owned by Property NSW, an agency of the Government of New South Wales. It was added to the New South Wales State Heritage Register on 10 May 2002.

== History ==
Between 1788 and 1816, the site which is now 61-65 Harrington Street formed part of the garden of the Colony's Hospital. When the hospital was moved in 1815, this opened up the land for development. The site appears to have been built on by 1822 and by 1835 according to Russell's Survey, it contained an L-shaped building, which is also evident on a sewerage survey from c. 1860.

In 1845, one building was recorded on this site by Council, described as a four-room stone house with a shingled roof in "bad repair". The land was a Town Grant made to William Young; and Young is recorded as the owner by Council in 1851. From 1851 to c. 1870 the site changed hands on several occasions. Between 1867 and 1871 however, the earlier house was demolished. In 1871 the site is recorded as containing three two storey brick terrace houses with slate roofs. These are the terraces which remain on the site. Behind each of the houses was a divided yard which contained single storey buildings which abutted the main buildings. Behind these in the two northernmost yards were additional sheds and outhouses, though the exact form of these buildings is no known. In 1876, the buildings currently known as 61–65 Harrington St were numbered as 17–21 Harrington Street. The numbering again changed in 1889 to 23–27 Harrington Street.

In 1900 the NSW Government resumed the site and buildings which were tenanted as residential units until the 1970s. The current numbering was brought into effect in 1924. The terrace is now part of the Clocktower development designed by Michael Dysart, Architects, which comprises 55 serviced apartments, 35 shops, commercial office space and a car park, constructed 1986–89. The apartments are known as the Rendezvous Hotel.

== Description ==
61–65 Harrington Street is a mid-Victorian terrace, built c. 1870, of three houses of two storeys raised from the road on a stone wall. The brickwork has been painted. The group forms a complement to Nos 42-52 Harrington Street, almost directly opposite, with the same flattened arch decoration above the windows and doors. The window pattern varies in each house, twelve pane double hung being the most common. The steeply pitched roof is covered with corrugated iron.

Style: Mid Victorian Terrace; Storeys: Two; Facade: Brick; Roof Cladding: Iron (probably slate originally). Potential Archaeological Resource.

=== Modifications and dates ===
- 1986/87: The facades of the terrace were restored as part of the Clocktower development. The iron on the roofs was replaced by slate, thought to be the original roofing material.

Further research should be undertaken on the date of construction of the building and the extent of original fabric remaining. There is no evidence that the underfloor deposits have been disturbed, leaving a possible archaeological resource.

== Heritage listing ==
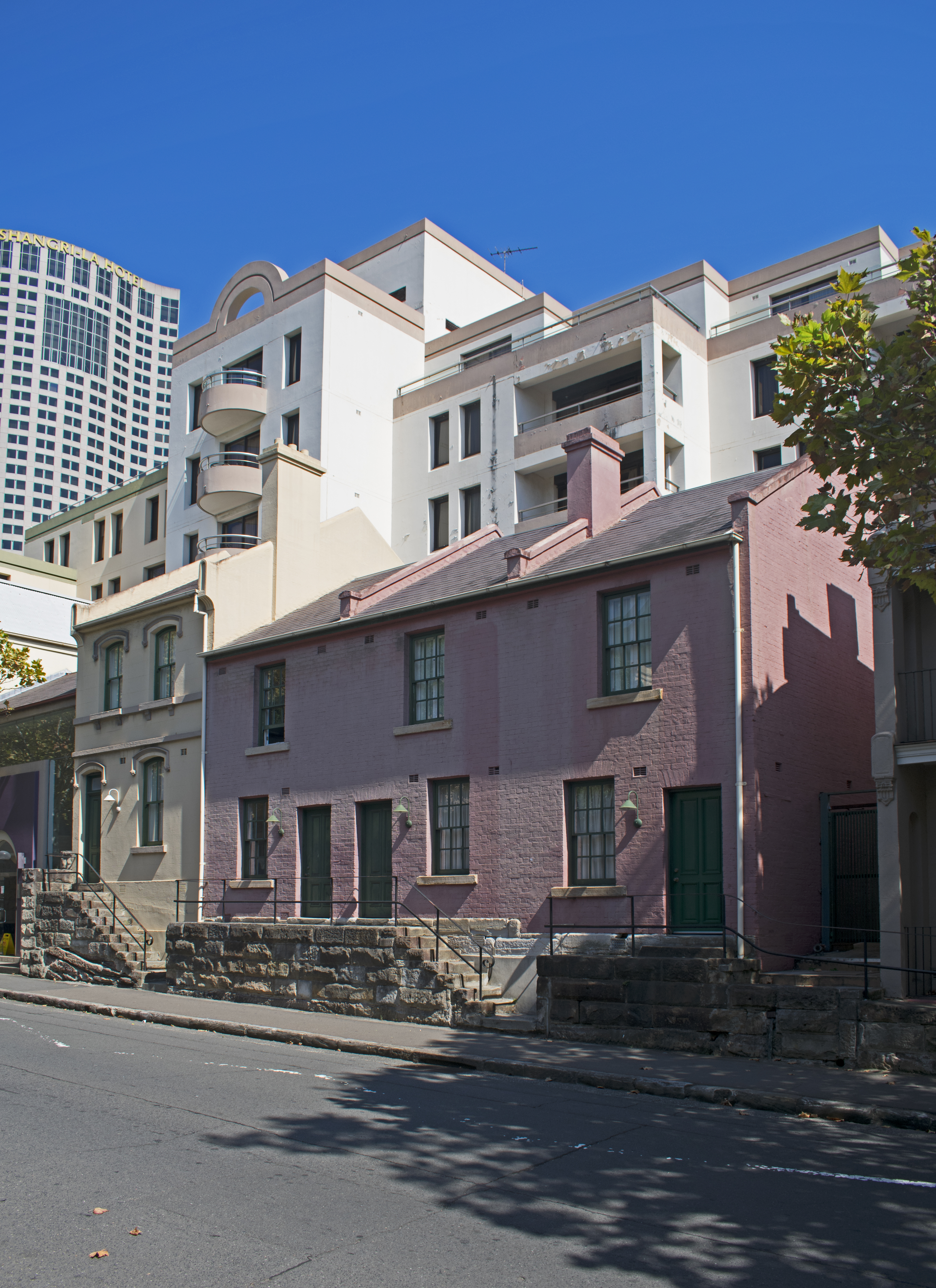
61-65 Harrington Street seen from the northeast

As at 31 March 2011, These terraces and site are of State heritage significance for their historical and scientific cultural values. The site and building are also of State heritage significance for their contribution to The Rocks area which is of State Heritage significance in its own right. The site has historical significance as part of the Colony's hospital site in 1807, and as part of the 19th century housing stock in The Rocks. The terrace has aesthetic significance as part of a strong visual precinct of buildings with Nos. 55–59 & 67–71, and Nos. 42–52 and the Harbour Rocks Hotel on the other side of the street, and also relates to the buildings at 39–47 Argyle Street. There is a potential archaeological resource remaining in the underfloor area of this site with significant research value into the hospital garden and subsequent site development. This has the potential to add to knowledge about the history of settlement in this area, the earliest European settlement in Australia.

Terrace was listed on the New South Wales State Heritage Register on 10 May 2002 having satisfied the following criteria.

The place is important in demonstrating the course, or pattern, of cultural or natural history in New South Wales.

These terraces and site are of State heritage significance for their historical and scientific cultural values. The site and building are also of State heritage significance for their contribution to The Rocks area which is of State Heritage significance in its own right. The site has historical significance as part of the Colony's hospital site in 1807, and as part of the 19th century housing stock in The Rocks. The terrace has aesthetic significance as part of a strong visual precinct of buildings with Nos. 55–59 & 67–71, and Nos. 42–52 and the Harbour Rocks Hotel on the other side of the street, and also relates to the buildings at 39–47 Argyle Street.

The place has potential to yield information that will contribute to an understanding of the cultural or natural history of New South Wales.

There is a potential archaeological resource remaining in the underfloor area of this site with significant research value into the hospital garden and subsequent site development. This has the potential to add to knowledge about the history of settlement in this area, the earliest European settlement in Australia. The Rocks is an archaeologically sensitive area and there is potential at this site for archaeological features and deposits from all stages of development. While evidence from the hospital is likely to be ephemeral and possibly disturbed it would be of State Significance.

== See also ==
- Australian residential architectural styles
