= 182.5–188 Cumberland Street, The Rocks =

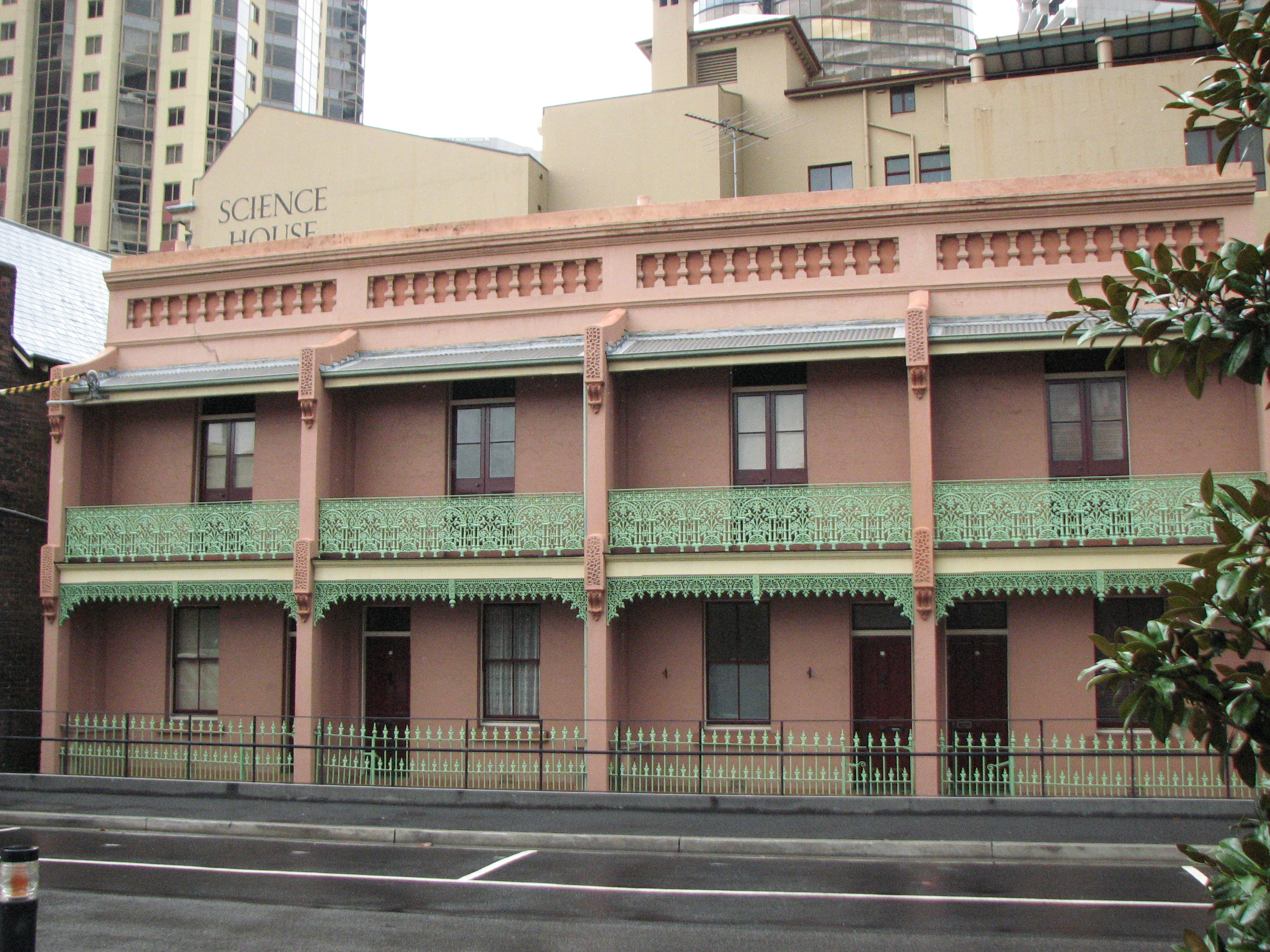
- 182.5–188 Cumberland Street, The Rocks, New South Wales

- Location within Sydney Location within Australia
- 33.8620°S 151.2060°E
- Location: 182.5–188 Cumberland Street, The Rocks, City of Sydney, New South Wales, Australia

History
- Built: 1890

Site notes
- Owner: Property NSW

New South Wales Heritage Register
- Official name: Terraces
- Type: State heritage (built)
- Designated: 10 May 2002
- Reference no.: 1607
- Type: Terrace
- Category: Residential buildings (private)
- Builders: William John Finneran

182.5–188 Cumberland Street, The Rocks are a series of heritage-listed terrace houses located in the inner Sydney suburb of The Rocks in New South Wales, Australia. They were built during 1890 by William John Finneran. The property is owned by Property NSW, an agency of the Government of New South Wales. It was added to the New South Wales State Heritage Register on 10 May 2002.

== History ==
In the area of study the houses on allotment 7, Nos. 169-171 Gloucester Street, were demolished between 1880 and 1882 and the land was still vacant when it was consolidated in a single title with the adjoining land in Cumberland Street in 1898. On the Cumberland Street frontage the houses on allotments 4 & 5, Nos. 184 & 186 Cumberland Street were demolished in 1889. By 1891 all of the area was owned by Herbert Salway. With a trend for the construction of large commercial premises in the area it is possible that Salway hoped to build on a large scale but any such plans were delayed by the depression of the 1890s. By 1898 the whole area was sold to James Channon. A month later Channon subdivided the land and sold that part of it to William John Finnegan, a builder of Rouse Hill. Four new houses had been built on the Cumberland Street frontage by 1900 and two on the Gloucester Street frontage by c. 1901–1902. It is most likely that Finnegan was the builder of all of these dwellings. Rate assessment books and entries in the Sands Directories suggest that the Cumberland Street terraces were completed and occupied by 1900. The terraces continued to be used as residences to the late 1970s, despite the building of the southern approach to the bridge and the gradual change of buildings in this area to a commercial use.

The buildings then were derelict for a number of years and prior to their restoration were occupied by squatters. Work on the terraces to restore them to residential use for leasehold was completed in 1996.

Archaeological History – Partially covered by grants (all Section 64): Lot 4 to William Long of 22 June 1839; Lot 5 to William Davis of 14 May 1836; Lot 6 Government Land claimed by T. Galbraith; Lot 7 claimed by Thomas Hancy. The Conservation Plan for the site revealed it had been occupied by two dwellings since at least the 1820s, the current terraces being constructed in 1898. Elements from an earlier structure (c. 1820s) were identified in the foundations and first floor wall of the terrace.

== Description ==
The terraces are typical examples of Victorian Terrace Houses built as an investment. The planning of the four terraces is similar with the basement containing the laundry and an external toilet; the ground floor containing the parlour, dining room and kitchen; the upper floor containing one large bedroom and two smaller bedrooms and a bathroom. Typical elevational details include some fine cast iron balustrade panels (largely intact), evidence of a cast iron frieze and brackets to the upper balcony beam and surviving examples of the cast iron fringe, brackets and frieze drop fixed below the balcony floor beam. Internally, the main rooms have or show evidence of moulded timber surrounds to fireplaces, four-panelled timber doors, decorative ceiling roses but no cornices.

Style: Victorian Terrace Houses; Facade: Painted brickwork; Ceilings: Original lath & plaster. Terraced houses including vacant lot.; Built By: 1820s

=== Condition ===
As at 27 April 2001, Archaeological Assessment Condition: Partly disturbed. Assessment Basis: A decision had been made with this site that ground disturbance would be minimal and limited to areas already disturbed by services. During conservation works however, part of the rear wall of the terraces collapsed due to an inadequate foundation, requiring urgent underpinning along the length of this wall. Subsequent excavation indicated that the two-storey rear wing was founded on demolition material from the earlier structure, which in some places was up to one metre in depth indicating that the site has a very high archaeological potential. Investigation: Watching Brief

Archaeology partly disturbed.

=== Modifications and dates ===
- 1995–96: The terrace was restored.

=== Further information ===
The conservation policies should be modified in the light of the conservation work undertaken in 1995–96.

== Heritage listing ==
As at 1 April 2011, this terrace and site are of State heritage significance for their historical and scientific cultural values. The site and building are also of State heritage significance for their contribution to The Rocks area which is of State Heritage significance in its own right.

The terraces have streetscape significance and provide a humanising aspect to this area of The Rocks. The historic significance of the terraces is reasonable, particularly due to their survival through the 1900s and the 1920s. These terraces are amongst the last examples of speculative housing to be constructed in this area. The architectural significance of the terraces is not particularly unique, but nonetheless they are a representative example of a building form common throughout Sydney. Few examples of terraces of this type remain in this area, and they provide a valuable record of the variety of nineteenth century housing forms once common in the Rocks and Millers Point. The site is significant as an archaeological resource (both above and below ground) spanning 180 years of residential use.

Terraces was listed on the New South Wales State Heritage Register on 10 May 2002 having satisfied the following criteria.

The place is important in demonstrating the course, or pattern, of cultural or natural history in New South Wales.

The site is situated within one of the earliest areas of settlement in Australia. The terraces reflect the original mainly residential use of this area from at least 1802 until the present. The early stone remnants incorporated in the present buildings have considerable historic significance, dating from the 1820s or earlier, and if so, may be amongst the earliest remnants of buildings in The Rocks. The site and its associated buildings were unaffected by the clearance activities initiated by the outbreak of bubonic plague due to their recent construction at that time. In the 1920s the site and its buildings again survived a major construction project in the area, namely the building of the Harbour Bridge, and stand in dramatic contrast to the ambition and style of the 1920s–1930s as shown in the bridge and its approaches. The Cumberland Street allotments have a minor associational significance with William Davis and William Long and although not occupied by them, reflect the vigorous early 19th century economic life in The Rocks.

The place is important in demonstrating aesthetic characteristics and/or a high degree of creative or technical achievement in New South Wales.

The terraces are now an example of the original residential nature of this quarter of The Rocks. The terraces display well-preserved cast iron and decorative plaster elements visible to passersby on the street. They also contain good examples of late 19th-century craftsmanship, in particular the joinery elements. Terrace No. 186 contains an early intact kitchen fireplace and cast iron hob. The restored terraces reinforce the character of the surrounding area and provide a humanising aspect to the streetscape.

The place has potential to yield information that will contribute to an understanding of the cultural or natural history of New South Wales.

The site has considerably rarity value being situated in one of the earliest areas of European settlement in Australia. The site has evidence of permanent residential usage from c.1802 to the present day and has the potential to demonstrate the way of life in a residential area of Sydney over almost two centuries. The site provides and accessible resource for archaeological investigation and historical, social and architectural interpretation, public access and education.

== See also ==
- Australian residential architectural styles
