= 32 Harrington Street, The Rocks =

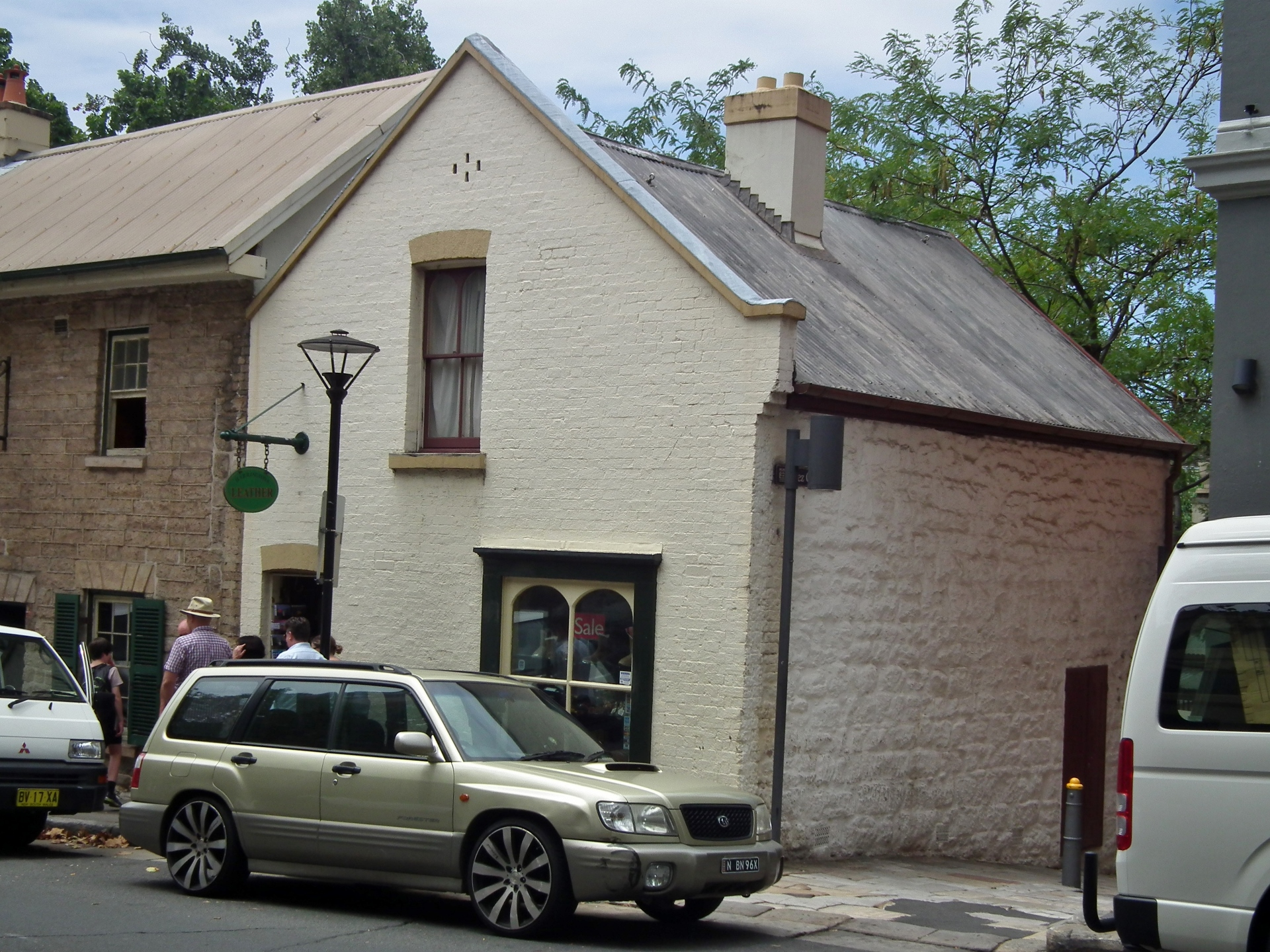
- 32 Harrington Street, The Rocks, pictured in 2014

- Location within Sydney Location within Australia
- 33.8594°S 151.2082°E
- Location: 32 Harrington Street, The Rocks, City of Sydney, New South Wales, Australia

History
- Built: 1834
- Built for: William Reynolds (blacksmith)

Site notes
- Architectural style: Old Colonial Georgian
- Owner: Property NSW

New South Wales Heritage Register
- Official name: Shop and Residence
- Type: State heritage (built)
- Designated: 10 May 2002
- Reference no.: 1586
- Type: Terrace
- Category: Residential buildings (private)
- Builders: William Reynolds

32 Harrington Street is a heritage-listed retail building and former residence located at 32 Harrington Street in the inner city Sydney suburb of The Rocks in the City of Sydney local government area of New South Wales, Australia. It was built for William Reynolds, a blacksmith, in 1834. The property is owned by Property NSW, an agency of the Government of New South Wales. It was added to the New South Wales State Heritage Register on 10 May 2002.

== History ==
William Reynolds arrived in Sydney from Dublin in 1817 under life sentence. A blacksmith by trade he had received his "Ticket of Leave" prior to 1826, when permission was given for his marriage to Ann Clarke; a conditional pardon was granted in 1835. In October 1830 Reynolds purchased the land from Thomas Ryan. The shop and residence was built by Reynolds by 1834.

The Reynolds had occupied the premises in Harrington Street since the 1830s, however, it was not until 1838 that the land title was officially gazetted. Following the death of William Reynolds in April 1841, his land and properties passed to his children. The executor of Reynolds will was Michael Gannon, the licensee of the New York Hotel on the corner of Argyle and Harrington Streets. It is clear from Harper's Plan of 1822 that no structures had been erected on the site now represented by Nos. 28 to 32 Harrington Street. Robert Russell's survey of Sydney in 1834 clearly indicates the presence of three distinct buildings on the site being Allotment 2. Nos. 28-30 being constructed of dressed sandstone with a shingled roof, evidence of which can be seen under the present iron one.

c. 1970s the building was used as a residence only. No 32 was tenanted until 1984.

== Description ==
No 32 is a two-storey brick shop with residence above built by 1834 by Reynolds. The rear of the building is of stone. Completed in the Old Colonial Georgian style, the two storey dwelling with corrugated iron cladding is completed with timber flooring.

== Heritage listing ==
As at 31 March 2011, this shop and residence and site are of State heritage significance for their historical and scientific cultural values. The site and building are also of State heritage significance for their contribution to The Rocks area which is of State Heritage significance in its own right.

Shop and Residence was listed on the New South Wales State Heritage Register on 10 May 2002 having satisfied the following criteria.

The place is important in demonstrating the course, or pattern, of cultural or natural history in New South Wales.

This shop and residence and site are of State heritage significance for their historical and scientific cultural values. The site and building are also of State heritage significance for their contribution to The Rocks area which is of State Heritage significance in its own right (see item no. 4500458).

== See also ==
- Australian residential architectural styles
- Harbour Rocks Hotel – former Evans' Stores, 34–40 Harrington Street
