= Old Police Station, The Rocks =

Heritage-listed building in Sydney, Australia

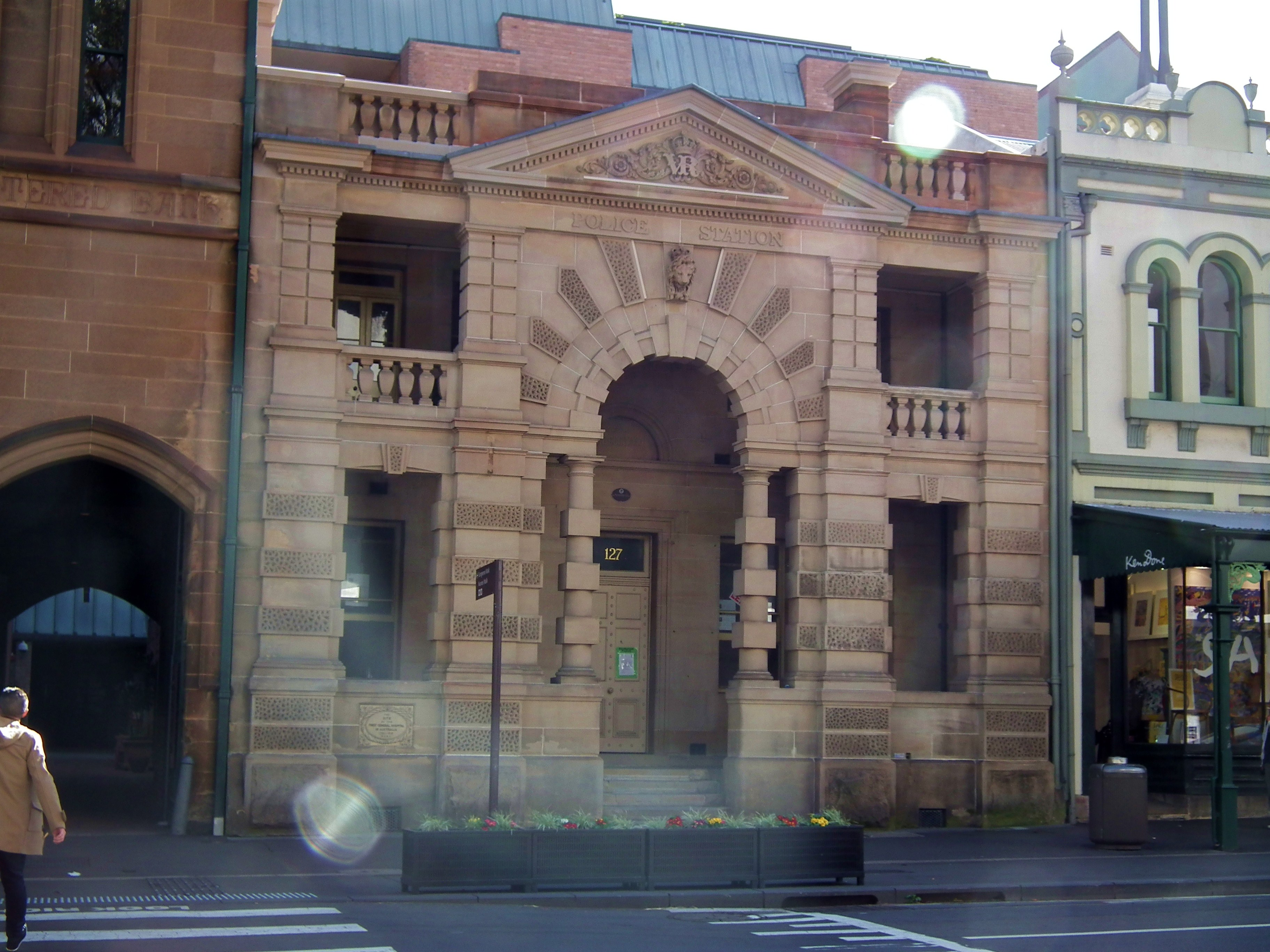
- The former police station, pictured in 2012.

- Location within Sydney Location within Australia
- 33.8602°S 151.2084°E
- Location: 127–129 George Street, The Rocks, City of Sydney, New South Wales, Australia

History
- Built: 1882

Site notes
- Architect: James Barnet
- Architectural style: Neo-classical
- Owner: Property NSW

New South Wales Heritage Register
- Official name: Police Station (former); Australian Craftworks Gallery; Christies
- Type: State heritage (built)
- Designated: 10 May 2002
- Reference no.: 1571
- Type: Police station
- Category: Law Enforcement
- Builders: W. Cains and Sons

The Old Police Station, The Rocks is a heritage-listed former police station and now home to Sergeant Lok, a Modern Asian restaurant and bar, that is located at 127–129 George Street in the inner city Sydney suburb of The Rocks in the City of Sydney local government area of New South Wales, Australia. It was designed by James Barnet and built in 1882 by W. Cains and Sons. The property is owned by Property NSW, an agency of the Government of New South Wales. It was added to the New South Wales State Heritage Register on 10 May 2002.

== History ==
The subject site was the location of the first General Hospital in Sydney which operated between 1788 and 1816. In 1797 High (George) Street was realigned. The realignment required the portable hospital to be pulled down and re-erected on a stone foundation slightly west of its original location. A store and dispensary were then erected to the north and west of the hospital buildings. In 1816 the Sydney Hospital opened in Macquarie Street and the old hospital closed.

In 1836 William Davis was granted the subject site in the form of 16 perches, although an 1834 survey suggests that houses were on the site prior to this grant and therefore, Davis had probably been in informal ownership of the land. It is also possible that the Davis building was part of the 1790-1816 hospital. By 1844 The Rocks had a reticulated water supply to public fountains. Gas mains were laid in the 1850s, as were water mains. Sewerage lines were installed during the mid-1860s. Archaeological investigation could possibly uncover evidence of these on the subject site.

The Rocks had a notorious reputation for trouble and violence stretching back to its colonial beginnings as a penal colony and early trading port. The "pushes" of the Rocks were particularly notable. Law and order were kept by mounted police or "troopers", in combination with ordinary police, who could be picked out in a crowd by their bell-topper hat, black coat and white duck trousers. The mounted police wore a military uniform similar to the regular 13th Light Dragoons.

Police control of the Rocks during the mid-19th century was achieved with the Water Police in George Street, a single constable in Harrington Street, a station house in Cumberland Street, and, more to keep a watchful eye on Millers Point, a station at government ground cornered at Kent and Argyle Streets.

Gazettal of an official police force occurred in 1862, when the Police Regulation Act, No. 16 was proclaimed. The Rocks had paled in police significance and, taking into consideration factors elsewhere, was less a charge on the city conscience. There were still sporadic eruptions of violence in the nineties, and those whose business or inclinations obliged them to pass through The Cut, were still aware of the sandbag and the footpad and the garrotter in gas-lit early 20th century. But these were not confined to The Rocks.

=== Royal Commission ===
In the 1890s a Royal Commission was formed "to make a diligent and full inquiry with the view of ascertaining the undoubted facts in the matter of alleged illicit gambling and immoralities among the Chinese resident in George-Street North, in the said City of Sydney and neighbourhood, and the alleged bribery or misconduct of any members of the NSW Police Force in relation thereto". The commission's investigation was to take three months from the 20 August 1891, but required two extensions before a final report was given in January 1892.

The two 'illegal' forms of gambling introduced by the Chinese were fan-tan (a game of chance) and pak-ah-pu (a sort of lottery). The Commission found that:

'Generally lottery tickets are sold amongst a display of bogus wares in the front shops, and fan-tan is carried on in one or more of the rooms behind. Access to the fan-tan rooms is gained as a rule through narrow passages, and then only at the pleasure of sentinels, who, according to the apparent intentions of the visitors, suspiciously open or double-bar the heavy doors with which ingress is regulated. Means of escape in case of surprise are artful and manifold, often from the same house leading into a back street, adjacent dwellings on either side, and across rear balconies and roofs to more distant houses tenanted by accomplices'.

In George Street North, the games mainly attracted wharf-labourers, sailors and coal-lumpers, and, because of the low cost, children were also buying the pak-ah-pu lottery tickets. The Commission put forward the following recommendations:

For the suppression of gambling

- That Non-commissioned Officers and Senior-constables be empowered without procuring a Magistrate's warrant to enter any house suspected on being a public gambling resort.
- That persons found on premises where gambling is in progress should be liable to arrest and summary conviction.
- That where gambling implements are found on suspected premises, the occupant should thereby be rendered liable to prosecution, and the onus of proof cast upon the accused of his being there for a lawful purpose.
- That the sale and purchase of pak-ah-pu tickets be made a misdemeanour.
- That, in houses suspected as public gambling resorts, the existence of barricades against police inspection be declared unlawful.
- That the police should, by the frequent visitation of gaming-houses, in addition to organised raids, harass those who make a living by gambling, or who gamble for amusement, as much as possible, without neglecting their duty in other directions.

For the suppression of opium smoking

- A stricter enforcement of the law relating to the sale and distribution of opium.

For improvement in the sanitary condition of Chinese residences

- A Common Lodging House Act, compelling the keepers of lodging-houses of all descriptions to provide adequate accommodation (cubic space, ventilation, water-closets, etc.).
- That Parliament should give its favourable consideration to the new Bill for the better government of the City of Sydney, now in course of preparation by the City Council

There were also many allegations against policemen taking bribes from the Chinese gamblers to turn a blind eye on the illegal gaming rooms. Some allegations, 'As reported in the press some of the statements volunteered by the deputation and the Members of Parliament who introduced them to the Colonial Secretary were:

'It would be most advisable to change the police. North George-street was regarded by the police as one of the best beats for making money.'

However, the Commission found that the witnesses bringing bribery charges against the police could not substantiate their claims without exception they had based their statements on mere suspicion, or upon allegations that had come to them second-hand. For the most part the evidence was hopelessly general. Indeed, so far as the more serious allegations made by the deputation to the Colonial Secretary were concerned, the witnesses against the police had so utterly failed to establish their case that the police were examined, and severely cross-examined, on the charges of bribery with a view to seeing if, by any chance, they would implicate themselves; and that they certainly did not. In general, the Commission emphatically discredited the charges of bribery against the police and rejected the charge of alleged inactivity by the police towards the Chinese gambling problem.

=== Resumption ===
The site was purchased from a Mr Billyard by the NSW Department of Public Works as a site for a watch house late in 1879. Additional land between the George Street North site and the Harrington Street site was later resumed. An outbreak of the Bubonic plague occurred in Sydney in 1900. The Government began resuming private property in The Rocks and demolishing large amounts of housing. Commercial properties were leased back to their former owners. The Rocks Resumption Board and the Sydney Harbour Trust also widened streets and redeveloped the waterfront in an effort to clean up the city.

=== Use as a police station ===
Tenders were called for the erection of the Police Station on 10 May 1881. The successful tenderer was W Cain and Sons. They were informed of the acceptance in June 1881 and the building was completed in 1882 and occupied by police in 1883. It is now one of only two nineteenth-century police stations in the inner city area. The Government Architect, James Barnet, designed the building in the form of a Palladian Water Gate. This was a structure where boats could discharge passengers with comfort and dry feet, and was considered as a "curious conceit for a police station". Barnet was influenced by a quay-side Lower George Street site.

Above the lofty entrance arch to the Police Station are Queen Victoria's initials with a lion's head, the symbol of British justice, with a policeman's truncheon in its mouth. The message of the head and truncheon is clear: Uphold the law, or else. . . They are representative of the very visual and conscious representation of government authority Barnet imbued in the design of his government buildings. These buildings were also a reflection of a type of conservatism in Barnet's attitude towards authority through the use of symbolism in carvings and an imposing, classic, style and form that reflected the authority of the function of the building.

The history of the head and truncheon are a constant source of interest. Folk legends abound. Historic sources indicate that the existing truncheon is the original. Other sources relate that in 1982 the truncheon was stolen, and a similar truncheon was created for a replacement. The original truncheon was made from an unknown material, and it has been suggested that the truncheon was originally bronze. The truncheon has been replaced twice between 1995 and 2000. The truncheon is currently a hardwood, and is now located in the lion's mouth facing in the opposite direction to the original.

When Barnet retired, he listed among his works 155 police stations. In all, he produced over 1350 works. Early on he established general plans for building types. That is, there was a standard style for post offices, a style for courthouses and so on. Police Stations have received limited attention in studies of Barnet and his work. In one recent study of Barnet's work the only police station listed among Barnet's significant works is the former Police Station at The Rocks. The General Post Office, the Lands Department and the Australian Museum together with court houses, hospitals and post offices generally have received greater attention. This is perhaps because police stations were often a part of courthouses, broader law and justice complexes or combined with policeman's residences. This is evident in the NSW Police Service S170 register. The police stations are within the grand courthouses or the smaller bungalow and other residential style buildings where the local policeman also lived. There are some identifiable police stations by Barnet that stand alone as does the station at 127-29 George Street. This includes the Glebe Police Station. However it, as with others, were designed with nearby courts or other precincts in mind and followed the general type-specific patterns characteristic of Barnet's designs.

Modifications to the building have been minor only. In 1900 a further two cell rooms were added. In 1921 a roof was erected over the exercise yard. In 1923 electric light was installed. The meal room was extended in 1957. The floor of the exercise yard has been raised. In 1937 additions to the first floor balconies were drawn up, for timber windows to be inserted into the balcony openings to George Street, and new flooring across from balcony floor to balcony floor to create a complete balcony at upper level over the portico. The unsympathetic windows which were inserted into the façade at the upper level balconies appear in a photo from 1970. These were removed and the original openings restored in the 1970s alterations.

=== Use as an art gallery ===
The police station ceased to operate as such on 2 November 1974, the building was transferred to the Sydney Cove Redevelopment Authority (SCRA) and was later opened as the Australian Craftworks Gallery. The SCRA (subsequently the Sydney Harbour Foreshore Authority (SHFA)) was established in the late 1960s by the State Government with the aim of redeveloping the entire Rocks area. Initial schemes for complete demolition of all the buildings within The Rocks and erection of a series of towers were received with considerable public opposition, and re-development projects were halted by Green Bans imposed by the building worker's unions. The main focus of the work undertaken by the SCRA in the 1970s was the adaptive re-use of buildings such as the subject place and the Argyle Centre.

During 1977 the front balconies were restored by the SCRA, which also provided the toilets on the first floor. The following year the raised exercise yard and part of the old covered yard were removed to make way for the Nurses Walk. Restoration work then proceeded, the work included the copper roof and the yard, cleaning of walls, stone paving and the steel fence to the present-day remains of the exercise yard.

The building is currently occupied by Christie's, the Craftworks Gallery having vacated the building in 2003. The building is intact and in good condition. The building remained under the control of the Sydney Harbour Foreshore Authority, that promoted the conservation of significant items and buildings, such as the subject place, following established conservation principles and methodology.

== Description ==
The façade features an interesting Palladian water gate design with heavily articulated piers, quoins and voussoirs. It also has a well carved lion's head key stone to the arch and a coat of arms to the Neo Classical pediment.

Style: Neo-classical; Storeys: 2; Facade: Stone; Internal Walls: Brick; Roof Cladding: Slate and Copper; Internal Structure: Brick; Floor Frame: Timber

The building is highly intact, retaining much of its original form and detail internally and externally. The symmetrical sandstone façade forms the front elevation of two-storey verandah/void. The slate roof is a pitched from behind the stone parapet. The rear of the building is constructed of dry pressed clay bricks which is generally unrendered.

The building has two stories to the front, comprising former offices on both levels connected by a timber stair. Most original joinery and other finishes remains intact; including stair, architraves, window. The upper level offices (facing street) have access to separate balconies which project across the double height portico space. The balconies are of timber construction with wrought iron balustrades.

The single storey rear of the building is defined by two side boundary parapet walls, from which the two main roof planes pitch down to the middle. A timber framed clerestory window (curved roof over) runs the length of the building, and is located in the centre valley of two pitched roofs. Internally, there is a central corridor off which are a number of single and double cells. The cells retain many of their original (or early) fixtures including, metal cell doors and hardware and window grilles. There are external open spaces associated with the cells.

=== Condition ===
As at 27 April 2001, while the building is in overall good condition, there is some damage/deterioration of the sandstone due to poor drainage and related issues. The interior whilst largely intact, requires some maintenance. The impact of modern fittings and fixtures such as the fairy lights, and shop display fittings may require review as part of future management of the building. The modified central entry, while intrusive, is reversible and the long-term management of the building should seek to reinstate original form and detail.

Archaeology Assessment Condition: Partly disturbed. Assessment Basis: Floors level with George Street, and terraced up to former level of Nurses Walk.

=== Modifications and dates ===
- 1900 – Two cells added to the police station building
- 1921 – Roof erected over the exercise yard.
- 1923 – Electric light installed
- 1937 – Plans drawn up to convert first floor balconies into one balcony involving the removal of the internal wall balustrading, insertion of windows on the front façade and construction of timber floor between the two existing balconies.
- 1957 – Meal room extended.
- 1974 – Police vacated building
- 1977 – Verandah restored and façade cleaned. Toilets constructed on the first floor of the building. Part of the exercise yard and the old covered yard were demolished to make way for the Nurses Walk to the rear (west) of the police station building.
- 1980 – Entered in Register of Australian Heritage Commission. Commenced use as a craft centre.
- 1981 – Cast iron vents and door knob restored. Stone steps (front) reconstructed.
- 2003 – Australian Craftworks Gallery vacated the building, Christies moved in.
- 2019 – Sergeant Lok, a Modern Asian restaurant and bar, took residency in the building.

== Heritage listing ==
As at 12 April 2005, the former Police Station building and site are of State heritage significance for their historical and scientific cultural values. The site and building are also of State heritage significance for their contribution to The Rocks area which is of State Heritage significance in its own right (see item no. 4500458).

A strong yet picturesquely designed small government building, it is one of only two 19th-century police stations remaining in the inner city and provides an important focal point to the George Street business precinct facades. The building demonstrates late 19th century police station/cell design. While the building is architecturally unusual, for this type of building, it shows police offices and cells, similar in design and layout to other /regional rural police barracks and jails in NSW. The building is publicly accessible through its current use.

Significant aspects of the building include its overall architectural form and detail. This includes the sandstone façade, steps and flagged portico, and timber balconies. The rear form comprising face brickwork, external court spaces and associated features are also important. Internally, the original layout and other features including joinery, metal cell fixtures, fireplaces and stairs contribute to the significance of the building.

Police Station was listed on the New South Wales State Heritage Register on 10 May 2002 having satisfied the following criteria.

The place is important in demonstrating the course, or pattern, of cultural or natural history in New South Wales.

The former Police Station building and site are of State heritage significance for their historical and scientific cultural values. The site and building are also of State heritage significance for their contribution to The Rocks area which is of State Heritage significance in its own right. The building contributes to the understanding of the historical development of The Rocks.

The land on which the building stands is significant as the location of the first hospital in Sydney and the history of the beginning of health and healthcare in Australia. It is also an early representation of the beneficial relationship between scientific and natural remedies through the presence of the herb garden.

The building is significant for its departure from Barnet's more standardised design for public building construction which he developed from the 1860s to 1890. It is a 19th-century reminder of the location and presence of early law enforcement in Sydney and the importance of this presence in the Rocks area.

The place has a strong or special association with a person, or group of persons, of importance of cultural or natural history of New South Wales's history.

The former Police Station is associated with James Barnet, Colonial Architect, whose work is readily identifiable all over NSW and provides a strong physical connection between the past and the present in towns with visually dominate examples of his work. It is also important as part of a body of work of over 1300 buildings which demonstrates Barnet's development as an architect, his views on public architecture and his influence on the development of public architecture in NSW.

The place is important in demonstrating aesthetic characteristics and/or a high degree of creative or technical achievement in New South Wales.

A strong yet picturesquely designed small government building it is one of only two 19th-century police stations remaining in the inner city and provides an important focal point to the George Street business precinct facades. The building demonstrates late 19th century police station/cell design. While the building is architecturally unusual, for this type of building, it shows police offices and cells, similar in design and layout to other /regional rural police barracks and jails in NSW. The building is publicly accessible through its current use.

Significant aspects of the building include its overall architectural form and detail. This includes the sandstone façade, steps and flagged portico, and timber balconies. The rear form comprising face brickwork, external court spaces and associated features are also important. Internally, the original layout and other features including joinery, metal cell fixtures, fireplaces and stairs contribute to the significance of the building.

The place has a strong or special association with a particular community or cultural group in New South Wales for social, cultural or spiritual reasons.

the building has social significance as the site of the first hospital, evidenced by the plaque commemorating this place by the RHAS prominently on the front of the building. It has social significance as shown by the numerous stories of the truncheon being stolen in pranks, whether true or not.

The place has potential to yield information that will contribute to an understanding of the cultural or natural history of New South Wales.

The building demonstrates technical and research significance as a good example of building techniques, particularly of police station and cell design, from the late 19th century

The place possesses uncommon, rare or endangered aspects of the cultural or natural history of New South Wales.

The building is rare, being only one of two surviving 19th century police stations in the inner city.

== See also ==
- Australian non-residential architectural styles
