= Harbour Rocks Hotel =

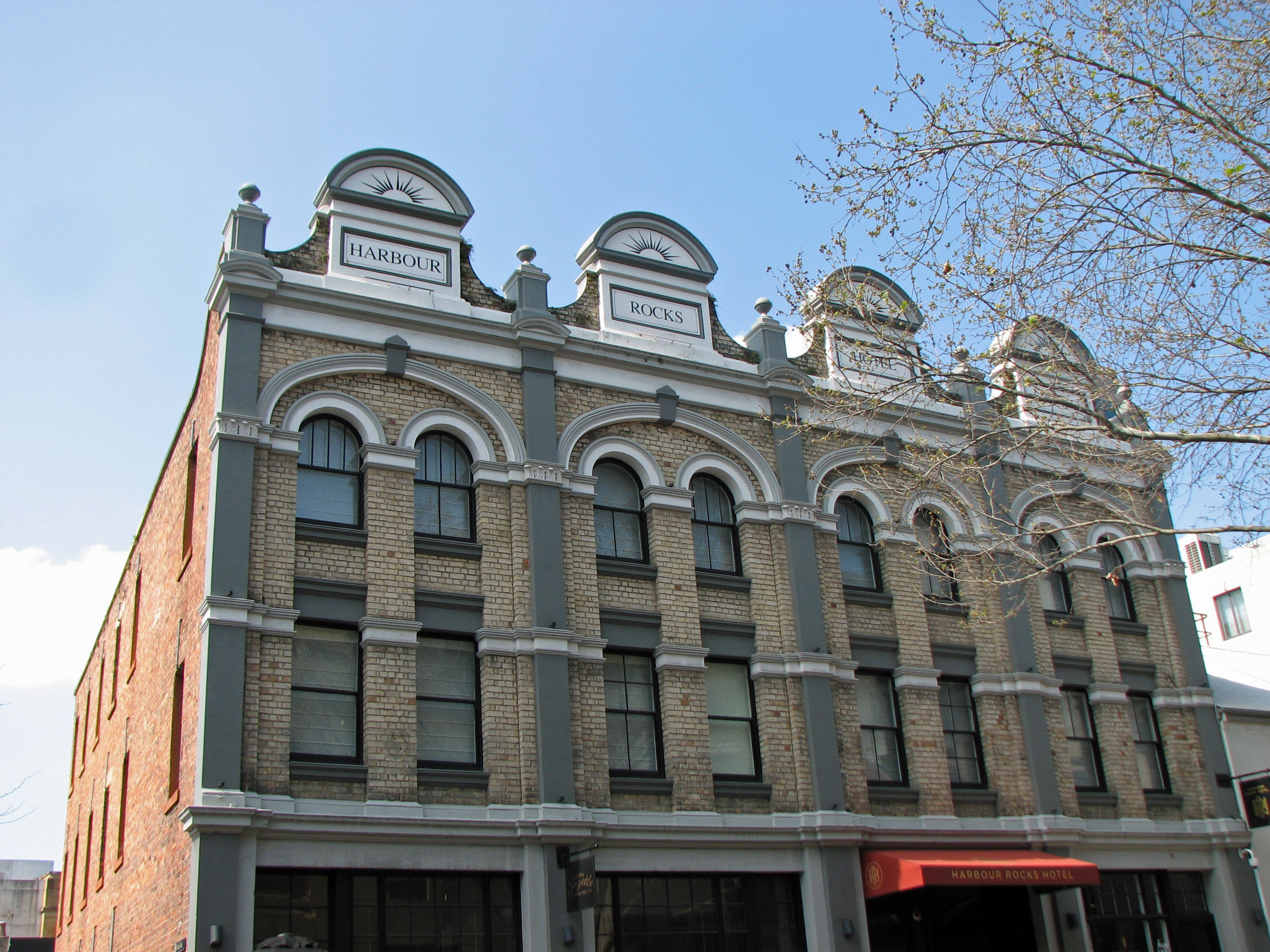
- Harbour Rocks Hotel, pictured in 2018

- Location within Sydney Location within Australia
- 33.8596°S 151.2082°E
- Location: 34–40 and 42–52 Harrington Street, The Rocks, City of Sydney, New South Wales, Australia

History
- Built: 1873–1875; 1890
- Built for: George Evans

Site notes
- Owner: Property NSW
- Website: www.harbourrocks.com.au

New South Wales Heritage Register
- Official name: Evans' Stores, Harbour Rocks Hotel; Evans' Stores; Hotel also occupies Terraces at 42-52 Harrington Street
- Type: State heritage (built)
- Designated: 10 May 2002
- Reference no.: 1545; 1611
- Type: Hotel
- Category: Commercial

The Harbour Rocks Hotel is a heritage-listed pub, hotel, shops and former warehouse and terrace cottages located at 34–40 and 42–52 Harrington Street in the inner city Sydney suburb of The Rocks in the City of Sydney local government area of New South Wales, Australia. It was built from 1873 to 1875; and again during 1890 for George Evans. It is also known as Evans' Stores. The property is owned by Property NSW, an agency of the Government of New South Wales. It was added to the New South Wales State Heritage Register on 10 May 2002.

Part of the AccorHotels MGallery group, the building is currently a four star-rated hotel, and also houses the Lanes Restaurant & Bar on the lower level, complete with an outdoor terrace.

== History ==
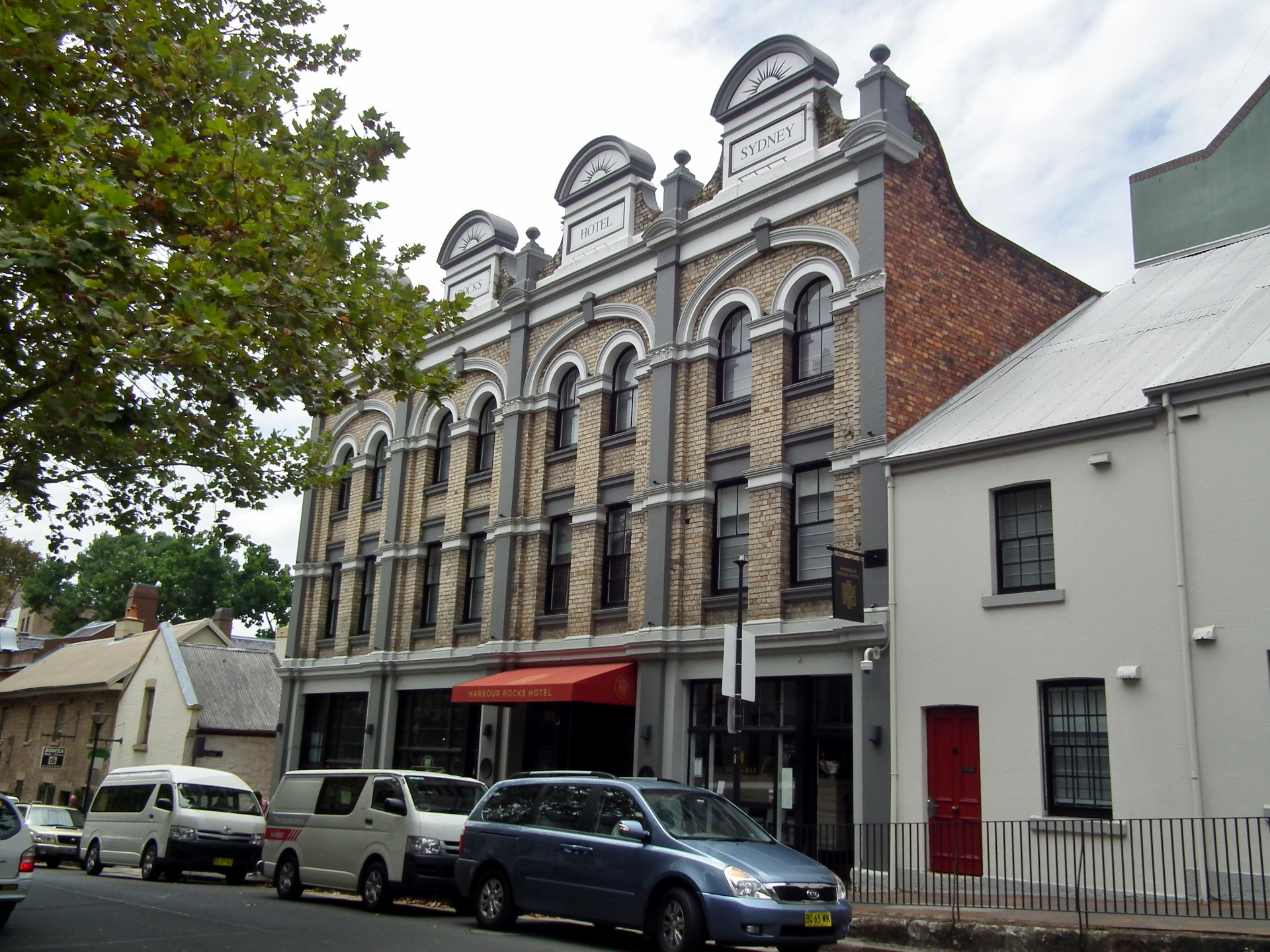
Harbour Rocks Hotel (Evans' Stores).

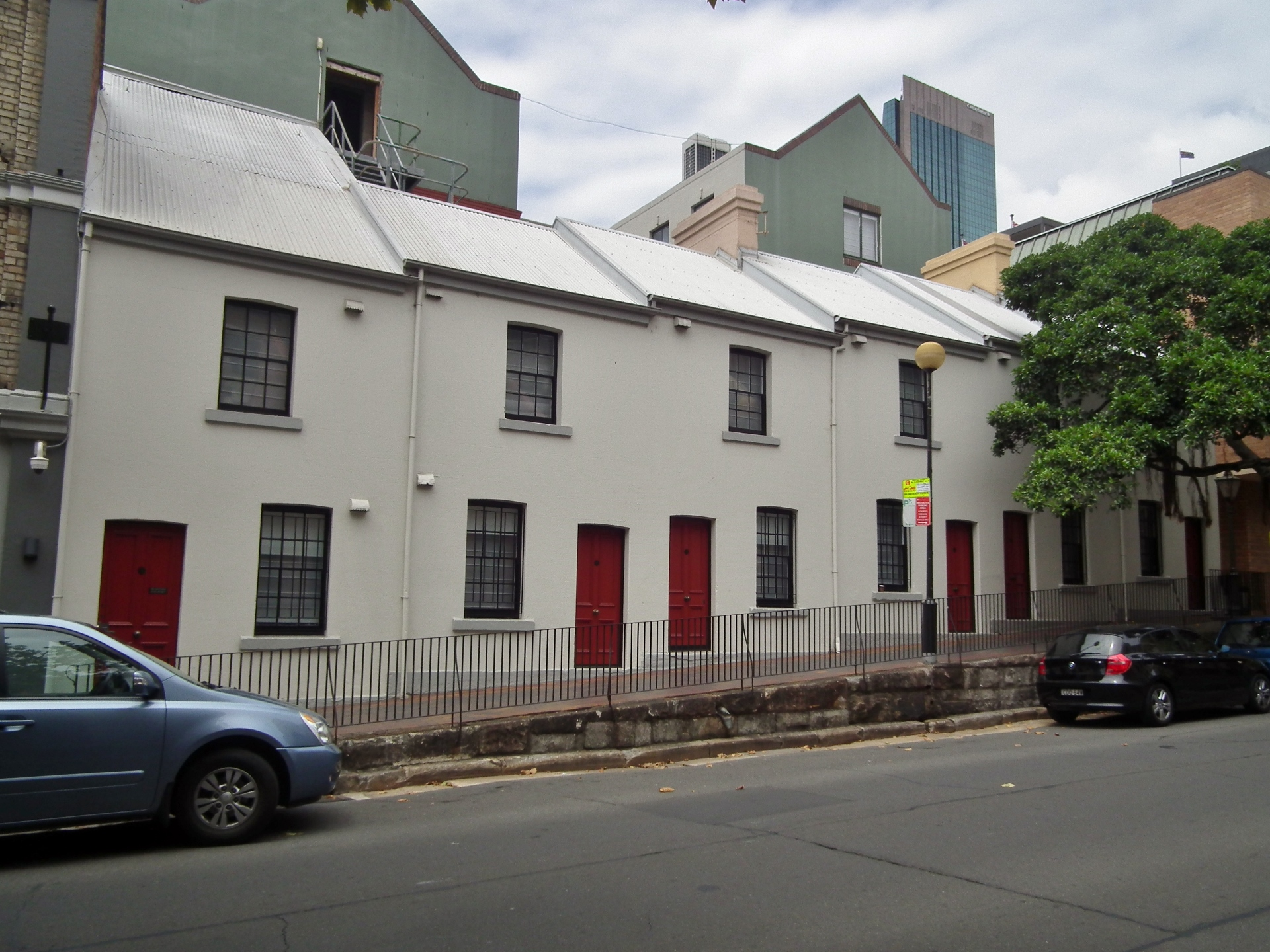
Terraces on Harrington Street, part of the Harbour Rocks Hotel.

This site was part of the original hospital gardens. The land is shown on 1834 map as reserved for Presbyterian Church.

=== 34–40 Harrington Street ===
In 1836 evidence presented to the Court of Claims stated that Allotment 3 had been promised to David Smith by Governor Macquarie as a reward for services as a master mariner. Smith sold the land to Thomas Middleton shortly after acquiring it. The Court accepted the claim although no date was given for Smith land acquisition, but a later Abstract of Title gives it as 1814 with additional information that the land was sold about a month later. In 1841 is shown as Open space as left by Government.

Middleton died intestate in about 1828 but a claim by his son Charles, who was still a minor, was accepted in 1836 and the land granted to him. In 1842 when Charles Middleton was about 22 years old, he subdivided the Harrington Street property and put it up for public auction. There was only one buyer, William Adnum who purchased Lot 1 for the rather large sum of £335, the large sum may indicate there was a building on the site, although there is no record in the rate book. The remainder of the allotment was purchased 3 years later by Charles Middleton's mother Eliza for £200.

In 1846 William Riley purchased Adnum's allotment for half the price he paid for it and then in 1848 purchased Mrs Middleton's land for the same price as she paid for it.

The first major development of the site occurring during Riley's ownership during which ten dwellings were constructed on the allotment. The houses were constructed of different materials, those on Harrington Street and along the laneway were of stone and three houses at the back of the block were built of brick. The "Wells" map of 1850 shows buildings on the site, and the City Council detail sheet of 1856 shows the arrangement of the buildings. This latter map refers to the lane beside the buildings as 'Riley's Lane'. Later the name of the lane was to change to "Reynolds Lane" in 1871, "Harrington Lane" in 1880 and finally "Harrington Place" in 1883.

By 1856 ten houses filled the allotment, the difference in level between Harrington and George Streets enabled the houses to be tiered into a small site, the arrangement of the back yards and outbuildings was irregular and for No. 10 Harrington Street appear to be non-existent, other than by a share arrangement with No 11 Riley's (later Reynolds) Lane. While this type of stacking of houses was common in The Rocks, conditions were ameliorated to some extent by the fact that the land to the south (allotment 3) had not been built upon, while the properties to the east were mainly on the George Street frontage, providing a little more light and air than if the surrounding area had been completely built out.

In 1858 and 1861 Nos 12 and 14 Harrington Street were listed in the Sands Directories as seamen's lodging houses but this use seem to have been of short duration. For the next twenty years, the houses were generally let to long term tenants. For all of its owners form the 1850s to the 1880s, the Harrington Street houses were investment properties, probably let on weekly tenancies. In 1854 William Riley, now a "landowner" having moved up the social ladder, sold his Harrington Street houses with other properties to Patrick Murphy for £4,360, a phenomenal rise in value, indicative of high city land prices following the gold rush. Six years later Murphy sold the houses to Donald Kell for £1,500. Kell's ownership became complicated when, after mortgaging the property to architect James Hume in 1868, Hume died intestate three years later. The mortgage was subsequently transferred to solicitors Billyard and Adams by the firm appointed by the Supreme Court to administer Hume's estate and Kell retained his property which was still mortgaged on his death in 1875.

Under the terms of Kell's will, the property was to be managed by his trustee to provide an income for his wife and unmarried daughter. Following his widow, Elizabeth's death in 1879 the property was to be divided between their three children: the three houses on Harrington Street to his son Joseph, the four houses in Reynolds Lane to his son John and the three brick houses off Reynolds Lane to Agnes, who had married in 1876. When the mortgage on the property was discharged in 1881, the three children were free to use their separate parts of the estate as the wished. They all eventually sold out to Richard Holdsworth and George Evans, both solicitors in Sydney.

Holdsworth and Evans immediately brought the property under Torrens Title and by June 1884 were tenants in common. The houses were rented to weekly tenants. In 1885 Holdsworth transferred his share of the property to George Evans for the token sum of £/10/0. The houses were demolished in 1885-86 and the new store erected in 1887.

The four-storey store was constructed with four separate loading docks on the ground floor at Harrington Street and with hoists in the rear lane. The plan was of one room per floor enabling the building to be let in four sections, each of four floors with loading facilities. For occupants requiring more space, the infill of the arches in the dividing walls could be removed.

In 1888 John William Cliff purchased the store for £8,000 and then leased it back to Evans. The first tenants W. Gardiner & Co bone and free stores stayed from 1887 until 1890. As there is no entry in the Sands Directory for tenants in the store from 1891 until 1883 the building may have been empty. Evans sold the property back to Evans in 1893 for £/10/0, he may have been in default with his mortgage payments.

In 1893 the building was leased to Cowan's gas meter manufacturers for five years. During this lease, there were extra windows added to the north wall of the building overlooking the laneway. It is not known if the firm used all the building but by 1895 part of it was being used as a barracks for the unemployed. In November 1895 the Australian Order of Industry and the Active Service Brigade announced the opening of a barracks for unemployed single men, it could accommodate up to 500 for 3d a night. During the 1890s depression the Brigade assisted the unemployed by establishing barracks in a succession of buildings around Sydney providing lodging and breakfast for a few pence. The aim of the organisation was not to provide charity but self-respect and reliance. The Harrington Street barracks were initially named the Wentworth Falls barracks but the name was changed to Liberty Hall in February 1896. As well as bed and breakfast, the organisation also arranged lectures and education in the building. The Harrington Street barracks were conveniently located near Circular Quay and the wharves, where work should be available, and it seems that the barracks were maintained until 1900. Paying nominal rent, the barracks barely broke even and can have done little to pay off the mortgage to Evans.

By 1900 Evans again had commercial tenants, the John Gainsford's Australian Broom Factory, but the resumption of the property by the government put an end to his investment in Harrington Street. From about 1905 the building appears to have been fully occupied. The exact occupancy of the stores is difficult to work out as the building was designed in four sections that could be occupied together or as four separate tenancies. Another complication was the street numbering, they stores had four street addresses and had replaced three houses and until 1924, when the street was renumbered, the addresses varied between 1-12 Harrington Street, 8-12 Harrington Street, or in council rates books 8, 10, 12 and 12 1/2 Harrington Street. From about 1921 the Joplin manufacturing Company also used two of the adjacent terraces Nos 42 and 44 Harrington Street which were also included in its address in the street directories, even after the company gave up the lease of 44 Harrington Street at the end of 1927.

From 1905 until the early 1930s the stores were occupied by tenants whose businesses included: indenters and importers; chemists and druggists; sheep shearing machinery; a wool and skin store; an electrical engineer; an oil merchant and polish and ink manufacturers. Until 1925 there were usually four tenants, each occupying one section of the building. By far the longest-serving tenant was the Joplin Manufacturing Company, appearing first in 1903 as G. C. Joplin importer, they had a continuous history of occupancy until November 1971 when the company went out of business.

In 1970 the Sydney Cove Redevelopment Authority was set up to redevelop The Rocks area, the building was originally planned to be demolished but Green Bans placed by the BLF to support the local community prevented it. By 1983 the income generated by the occupants of the building did not meet the expenditure on the property and compliance with Ordinance 70 necessitated considerable expenditure to bring the stores up to current standards.

The best outcome for the Authority was for a developer to pay for the maintenance and upkeep of the buildings, so along with the terraces 42–52 Harrington Street an Expression of Interest was put out in 1986 and five submissions received. The submission by the Tara Hotel Group was recommended to the Minister on financial and architectural grounds. The proposal was for a budget hotel using the stores and terraces with new construction at the rear. The new development took place in 1988 and the Harbour Rocks Hotel was opened in 1989. Since then changes for disabled access, the rearrangement of the restaurant and bar areas and the provision of balconies at the rear have occurred.

The building was refurbished in 2012 to restore much of its original historic feel, with modern furnishings and facilities in its 59 rooms. There is a bar which doubles as reception.

=== 42–52 Harrington Street ===
It was not until 1871 that a deed of grant was issued for the land and five months later the Presbyterian Church sold the land to Henry Bradburn Dobson, Louis Jacobs and Sydney Jacobs. Just over a year later they sold the land to Walter Bradley, an auctioneer from whom Henry Dobson repurchased the land in his own right. Dobson was a Sydney builder, but the Jacobs were importers and it seems likely that their role was as Dobson's temporary financers. The 1873 sale plan shows the allotment divided into four lots each with a frontage of 6.1 metres (20 ft) to Harrington Street but when Dobson built on the land he constructed six terraces fronting Harrington St with another six built at a lower level behind them. These houses had frontages to the land left vacant by the government in the original subdivision which was reached by Reynold's Lane. Finance for the construction of the houses was provided by a series of mortgages from Edward Terry in 1873, the auctioneers Edward Raynes and Josiah Richard Treeve in April 1874 and George Thornton in February 1875. The houses were built during this period and were described as "recently-erected" when put up for auction in May 1875 by Raynes, Treeve & Co. James McClellan, a teacher, purchased the houses. Sobson had borrowed heavily on the properties and went into voluntary insolvency being unable to meet his repayments to the Bank of New South Wales.

McClelland, who seems to have got something of a bargain remained the owner of the twelve houses until 1885. The sales notices indicated that the houses attracted respectable tenants, tradesmen rather than labourers, and they enjoyed considerable period of occupancy. Unlike the terraces next door, all the houses had backyards and the necessary outbuildings. The property changed hands four times in the period from 1885 until resumption in 1900 but there were no major breaks in tenancies.

After the government resumed the properties in 1900, the six houses at the rear-facing Harrington Lane were demolished between 1911 and 1914. The condition of the remaining houses on Harrington St seems to have been rather rudimentary and the City Council issued several orders for the houses to be repaired and renovated in the 1920s and '30s. Electricity was provided in the late 1930s provided the tenants agreed to an increase in their rent. Although many of the tenants remained in the same houses for years, rent arrears were quiet common and the Maritime Services Board appears to have been comparatively relaxed about this situation. Over a period of 30 years from the 1920s to the 1950s the rent increased from 1 pound a week to 1.7shillings, by the 1970s when the Sydney Cove Redevelopment Authority acquired the houses the rent increased between 1971 from $8.40 to $20 by 1975.

For a short period in the 1920s Joplins Manufacturing Company in the adjacent stores also rented two of the terraces reducing the number of residences to four, but they gave up no 44 in 1927.

The date that the houses became vacant is not known but from the late 1980s the decision to amalgamate the terraces with developments on the adjacent site to provide a viable commercial premises resulted in their redevelopment as part of a new hotel, a considerable move "up market" from their origins. The submission by the Tara Hotel Group was recommended to the Minister on financial and architectural grounds. The proposal was for a budget hotel using the stores and terraces with new construction at the rear. The new development took place in 1988 and the Harbour Rocks Hotel was opened in 1989. Since then changes for disabled access, the rearrangement of the restaurant and bar areas and the provision of balconies at the rear have occurred.

== Description ==
=== 34–40 Harrington Street ===
The former Evans' Stores is an imposing three-storey brick warehouse with a painted façade. The building is dominated by four pediments above the cornice, each decorated with a sunrise motif. The façade is divided into four bays by pilasters capped by finials. In 1989, work was completed on the conversion of the Stores and the adjoining terraces at 42-52 Harrington Street, with shops, bars and restaurants facing Nurses Walk to the rear.

==== Condition ====
As at 27 April 2001, the archaeological assessment condition was mostly disturbed. Assessment Basis: Terraced into hill slope from Nurses Walk frontage. Above ground archaeological remains.

==== Modifications and dates ====
- 1907: Sewer line connections were made to the building.
- Mid 1960s: The building has been largely used as a workshop, stores, offices, art gallery and craft centre.
- 1978: The raised timber walkway was constructed to provide improved access from the lowest floor level to the newly created pedestrian lane Nurses Walk.
- 1979: The name of the lane beside the building was changed from Harrington Place to Suez Canal.
- By 1989: The warehouse and the adjoining terraces were converted to the Harbour Rocks Hotel, and the facilities facing Nurses Walk were constructed.

=== 42–52 Harrington Street ===
Nos. 42–52 Harrington Street is a row of six two storey terrace houses stepped up Harrington Street of rendered brickwork. The steeply pitched roofs are of corrugated iron, the windows are double hung of twelve panes with sandstone sills. There is a characteristic Georgian flattened brick arch over the windows. In the conversion to a hotel in 1989, the two front rooms on the ground and first floors have been retained as individual suites, with access passageways built to the rear. An opening has been made in the walls between the rooms, and the bathrooms have been created in the rear room. In 1989, work was completed on the conversion of the Stores and the adjoining terraces at 42-52 Harrington Street, with shops, bars and restaurants facing Nurses Walk to the rear.

Style: Georgian; Storeys: Two; Facade: Brick; Roof Cladding: ?

==== Condition ====
As at 8 January 2009, Archaeology Assessment Condition: Below ground archaeological remains in the form of wells or cesspits may remain

Below ground archaeological remains could exist in the form of wells or cesspits.

==== Modifications and dates ====
By 1989: The warehouse and the adjoining terraces were converted to the Harbour Rocks Hotel, and the facilities facing Nurses Walk were constructed.

== Heritage listing ==
As at 30 March 2011, the Harbour Rocks Hotel and site, inclusive of the cottages are of State heritage significance for their historical and scientific cultural values. The site and building are also of State heritage significance for their contribution to The Rocks area which is of State Heritage significance in its own right.

The site of the Harbour Rocks Hotel is of historical significance as part of the original hospital garden, and of subsequent buildings from 1850 until the construction of the Evans' Stores in 1890. The Evans' Stores demonstrates the nineteenth-century mercantile/commercial built form of The Rocks. The building has aesthetic significance as an unusual and imposing warehouse which forms an important visual element in Harrington Street, with Suez Canal on one side and the terraces at 42–52 Harrington Street on the other. It also forms part of a strong visual precinct of buildings with Nos. 42–52 and Nos. 55–71 on the other side of the street, and relates to 39–47 Argyle Street. The terrace cottages make an important contribution to the streetscape and is representative of the terrace housing constructed for the working classes throughout The Rocks area and other parts of Sydney in the late 19th century. The ability of both buildings to demonstrate the principal characteristics of their type has been reduced by the extent of internal alteration, particularly in relation to the terrace houses.

The Harbour Rocks Hotel was listed on the New South Wales State Heritage Register on 10 May 2002 having satisfied the following criteria.

The place is important in demonstrating the course, or pattern, of cultural or natural history in New South Wales.

The site of the Harbour Rocks Hotel is of historical significance as part of the original hospital garden, and of subsequent buildings from 1850 until the construction of the Evans' Stores in 1887. The Evans' Stores demonstrates the nineteenth-century mercantile/commercial built form of The Rocks. The former stores meet this criterion at State level.

The place has a strong or special association with a person, or group of persons, of importance of cultural or natural history of New South Wales's history.

The former stores meet this criterion at a local level for their association with the Joplin Manufacturing Company which occupied the building continuously between 1903 and 1971. However, the terraces do not meet this criterion.

The place is important in demonstrating aesthetic characteristics and/or a high degree of creative or technical achievement in New South Wales.

The Harbour Rocks Hotel is a good example of a late Victorian Italianate Style warehouse with prominent pediments and symmetrical styling. The building makes a positive contribution to the streetscape. The former stores have aesthetic significance as an unusual and imposing warehouse which forms an important visual element in Harrington Street, with Suez Canal on one side and the terraces at 42-52 Harrington Street on the other. It also forms part of a strong visual precinct of buildings with Nos. 42–52 and Nos. 55–71 on the other side of the street, and relates to 39-47 Argyle Street. The former stores meet this criterion at State level for their contribution to the State Significant area of The Rocks. The terraces have aesthetic significance as it forms part of a strong visual precinct with the former stores building at Nos. 34–40 and Nos. 55–71 on the other side of the street and also relates to the buildings at 39–47 Argyle Street. The terraces make an important contribution to the streetscape. The terraces meet this criterion at State level.

The place has a strong or special association with a particular community or cultural group in New South Wales for social, cultural or spiritual reasons.

The former stores are of State heritage significance for their contribution to The Rocks area which is of State Heritage significance in its own right. The terraces do not meet this criterion.

The place has potential to yield information that will contribute to an understanding of the cultural or natural history of New South Wales.

Any remains associated with the hospital garden, artefact deposits or features association with the hospital building or auxiliary structures such as kitchens or wells, have the potential to retain information about a number of themes, such as alienation of the place after 1788, provision of early health facilities and the ongoing development of the site.

The place possesses uncommon, rare or endangered aspects of the cultural or natural history of New South Wales.

The former stores do not meet this criterion as there are a number of other examples of their kind, some better preserved internally within the local area.

The place is important in demonstrating the principal characteristics of a class of cultural or natural places/environments in New South Wales.

The former stores building is a good example of a Late Victorian Italianate Style warehouse with prominent pediments and symmetrical styling. It retains evidence of its former use such as hoisting beams, loading platforms and doors and internal hatch openings. The former stores meet this criterion at local level. The terrace at 42–52 Harrington Street is representative of the terrace housing constructed for the working classes throughout The Rocks area and other parts of Sydney in the late nineteenth century and visible in many historic photos. The plainness of the exterior is more likely to reflect economy rather than style. The terraces meet this criterion at local level.

== See also ==
- Australian non-residential architectural styles
- 32 Harrington Street
