= Property and Development NSW =

Statutory body in New South Wales, Australia

Statutory authority overview
- Formed: 1 July 2016
- Preceding agencies: Government Property NSW; Sydney Harbour Foreshore Authority; Teacher Housing Authority of NSW; Waste Assets Management Corporation
- Jurisdiction: New South Wales
- Headquarters: 4 Parramatta Square 12 Darcy Street, Parramatta NSW 2150
- Minister responsible: Steve Kamper, Minister for Lands and Property
- Statutory authority executive: Leon Walker, Chief Executive Officer, Property and Development NSW
- Parent department: Department of Planning, Housing and Infrastructure
- Key documents: Government Property NSW Act 2006; Sydney Harbour Foreshore Authority Act 1998; Teacher Housing Authority Act 1975; Waste Recycling and Processing Corporation (Authorised Transaction) Act 2010
- Website: www.nsw.gov.au/departments-and-agencies/property-and-development-nsw

Property and Development NSW is a statutory body of the Government of New South Wales that manages the state's significant property portfolio and its places. Formed on 1 July 2016, Property and Development NSW encompasses the entities of the former Government Property NSW (GPNSW), the former Sydney Harbour Foreshore Authority (SHFA), Teacher Housing Authority of NSW (THA) and Waste Assets Management Corporation (WAMC).

Services provided by Property and Development NSW include:

- leading property reform
- active portfolio and asset management
- delivering transactions and major projects
- place making and heritage conservation, and
- valuation services

The authority is led by chief executive officer, presently Leon Walker.
