= 32–36 and 38–40 Gloucester Street facades, The Rocks =

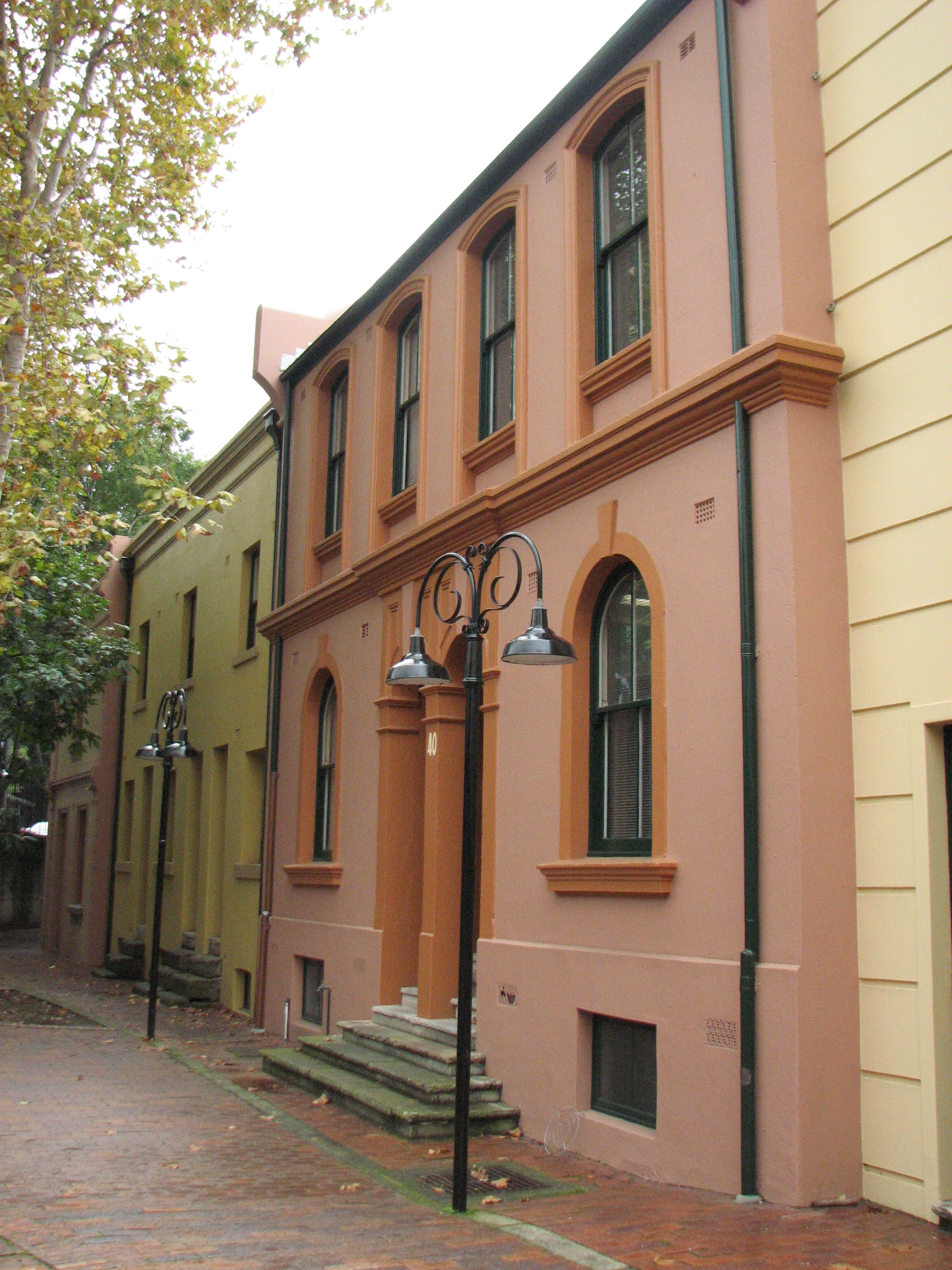
- 32–36 and 38–40 Gloucester Street facades, The Rocks, New South Wales

- Location within Sydney Location within Australia
- 33.8594°S 151.2073°E
- Location: 32–36 Gloucester Street; 38–40 Gloucester Street; The Rocks, City of Sydney, New South Wales, Australia

History
- Built: 1885

Site notes
- Architectural style: Victorian Italianate
- Owner: Property NSW

New South Wales Heritage Register
- Official name: Terrace; Part of development known as 40 Gloucester Street
- Type: State heritage (built)
- Designated: 10 May 2002
- Reference no.: 1604; 1605
- Type: Terrace
- Category: Residential buildings (private)

32–36 and 38–40 Gloucester Street facades, The Rocks is a heritage-listed former residence located at 32-36 and 38-40 Gloucester Street, in the inner city Sydney suburb of The Rocks in the City of Sydney local government area of New South Wales, Australia. It was built during 1885. It is also known as part of development known as 40 Gloucester Street. The property is owned by Property NSW, an agency of the Government of New South Wales. It was added to the New South Wales State Heritage Register on 10 May 2002.

== History ==
Meehan's survey of 1807 shows this area west of the gardens adjacent to the Hospital gardens. The first evidence of any structure on this site appears in 1857. A one-storey, four roomed, stone and shingled roofed house was owned and occupied by David Whitebrow. Some time after 1863 Whitebrow, a Master Mariner, and his wife moved in as tenants, eventually buying the property c. 1867. This family remained the owners of the property till 1901 when the Government resumed ownership of the property. Percy Doves plan of 1880 shows a structural layout for this site that is similar to the 1857–65 plan. However, the Sydney City Plan of 1887 reveals additional changes to this site. These changes are reflected in the Council Assessment Books of 1882, which records the presence of a three-storey brick and slate roofed terrace which is divided into three units.

The terraces were leased till c. 1980. In 1985–86 the facades of Nos. 26-40 Gloucester Street were retained as part of an office development known as No. 40 Gloucester Street. The work was completed in mid 1986. The original road level has been established and the line of the original kerb paved in sandstone. A flight of stairs has also been created leading from Gloucester Street to Cambridge Street on the southern side of No. 40 Gloucester Street in the tradition of lanes and stairs which are a feature of The Rocks.

According to the Council Rate Assessment records in 1851 this site contained two, one storey stone and shingle roofed houses. Between 1867–1869 No. 38 was demolished and this site remained a vacant block till 1883. No. 40 was occupied by different people till the house was demolished c. 1880. By 1884 Sands Sydney Directory records the presence of tenants at this site so it is reasonable to presume that a new residence has been constructed. The new structure being a three-storey, six room brick terrace with an iron roof, divided into two units. In the 1890s these premises were used as boarding houses by different tenants and were continually leased till the early 1980s. In 1985 the facade was retained and the pitched roof reinstated the remainder being demolished to become part of the office complex known as 40 Gloucester Street.

== Description ==
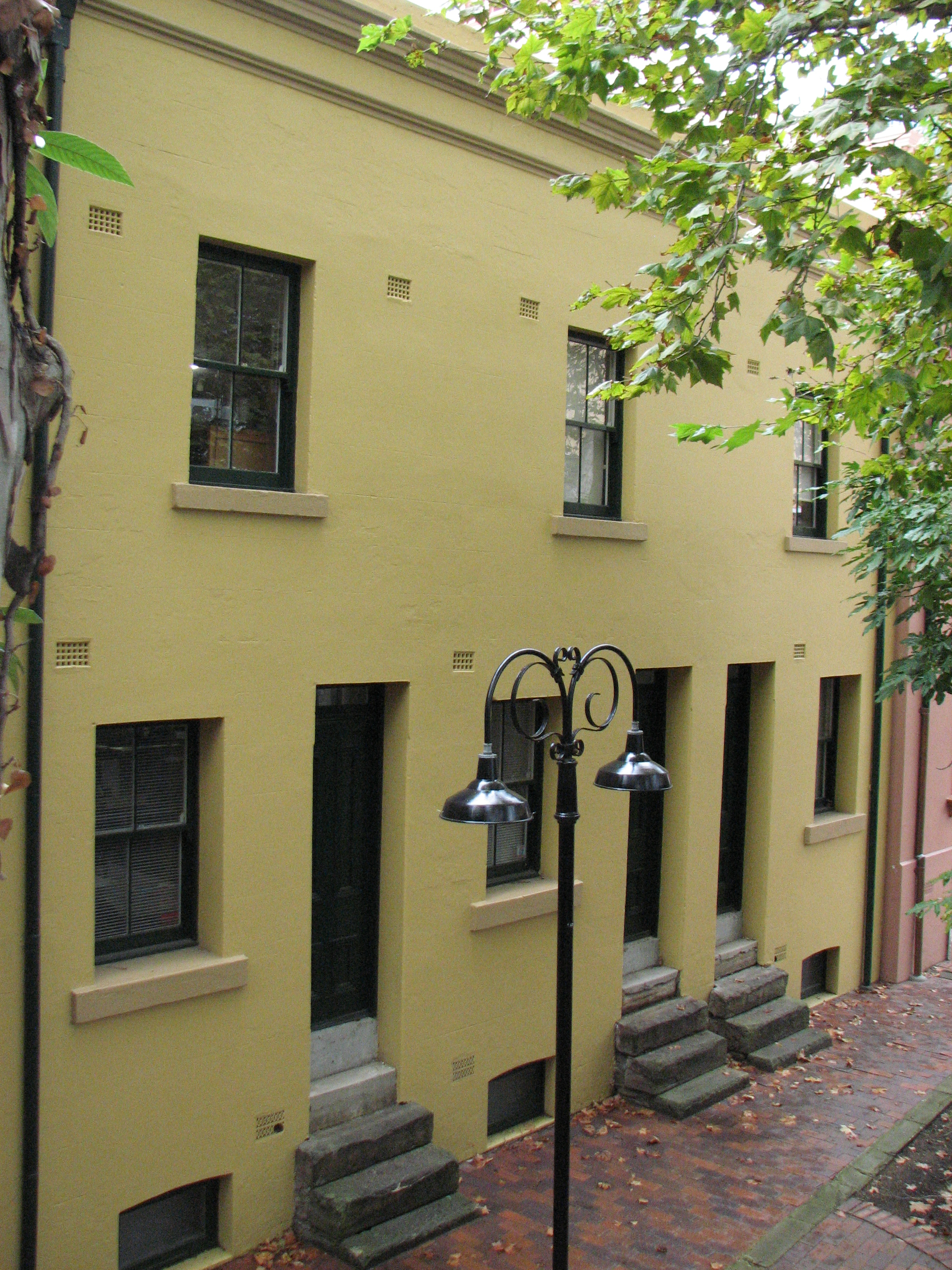
32-36 and 38-40 Gloucester Street facades, The Rocks

=== 32–36 Gloucester Street ===
The terrace at Nos. 32–36 Gloucester Street is a plain fronted Mid Victorian terrace continuous in height and fenestration with Nos. 24-26 and Nos. 28-30 Gloucester Street. The windows are double hung, four pane.

==== Condition ====
As at 3 May 2001, Archaeology Assessment Condition: Mostly disturbed. Assessment Basis: Recently restored. Terraced into hill slope. Cellars.

==== Modifications and dates ====
- Early 20th century: Nos. 22–24 Gloucester Street were demolished.
- 1985–86: The facades of Nos. 26–40 Gloucester Street were retained as part of an office development known as No. 40 Gloucester Street. The terrace at Nos. 42-44 Gloucester Street was demolished as part of this development and a two-storey infill building, sympathetic in scale and materials, was erected in its place. The work was completed in mid 1986. The original road level has been established and the line of the original kerb paved in sandstone. A flight of stairs has also been created leading from Gloucester Street to Cambridge Street on the southern side of No. 40 Gloucester Street in the tradition of lanes and stairs which are a feature of The Rocks.

=== 38–40 Gloucester Street ===
Nos. 38–40 Gloucester Street is a two-storey late Victorian Italianate style stuccoed terrace with basement. Its most distinctive features are the very tall decorated arched doorway openings and the arched windows with plain keystones. All the windows at ground level are double hung with one pane in the upper window, two in the lower. The windows of the upper storey are double hung with four panes.

Style: Italianate Terrace; Storeys: Three.

==== Condition ====
As at 3 May 2001, Archaeology Assessment Condition: Mostly disturbed. Assessment Basis: Recently restored. Terraced into hill slope. Cellars.

==== Modifications and dates ====
- 1983: As a result of the new development (Nos. 26-40 became a part of an office complex known as 40 Gloucester Street) the facades of 26-40 Gloucester Street have been retained at considerable expense. The terrace at Nos 42-44 Gloucester Street was demolished as part of this development and a two-storey infill building, sympathetic in scale and materials, was erected in its place. The original road level has been established and the line of the original kerb paved in sandstone. A flight of stairs has also been created leading from Gloucester Street to Cambridge Street in the tradition of lanes and stairs which are a feature of The Rocks.

== Heritage listing ==
=== 32–36 Gloucester Street ===
As at 1 April 2011, the terrace façade at 32–36 Gloucester Street and its site are of State heritage significance for their historical and scientific cultural values. The site and remnant structure are also of State heritage significance for their contribution to The Rocks area which is of State heritage significance in its own right.

The site of the terrace façade at 32–36 Gloucester Street has historical significance due to its continual occupation since the 1850s. It is aesthetically significant for its contribution to the streetscape as demonstrated by the surviving scale and form of the original building. The façade is part of a row of terrace house façades at 26-72 Gloucester Street (excluding Nos. 42–44, demolished in 1985), which remain basically unaltered in external appearance since their construction. As part of this row the façade at 32-36 Gloucester Street demonstrates "a rare juxtaposed study of the English terrace house form and its evolution as translated in Australia", (as identified by the National Trust). The changes which Terrace Façade survived have the ability to demonstrate a significant part of the story of The Rocks over time, including the civic improvements by the NSW Government, including the 1980s redevelopment of the site to create an office block, when the Government involvement resulted in the design that incorporated the Terrace Façade into the new structure. These changes demonstrate various attitudes to heritage conservation policy and practice in different periods, and demonstrate the impact of resident and community action on the Government policies for the retention of buildings in The Rocks.

Terrace was listed on the New South Wales State Heritage Register on 10 May 2002 having satisfied the following criteria.

The place is important in demonstrating the course, or pattern, of cultural or natural history in New South Wales.

The remnant façade of the Terrace at 32–36 Gloucester Street provides evidence of the street levels before the major realignment in 1911, through the former terrace floor levels located on the Gloucester Street lower level. The surviving façade fabric provides evidence of the design of terrace houses in Australia in the Victorian period. The fabric demonstrates the residential character of The Rocks in Victorian period. The original creation of the terrace was part of the speculative housing developments, built to generate rental income c. 1850s, and significantly modified with the same purpose c. 1880s. The terrace was subjected to resumption by the Government in 1900, used as working class accommodation after that date and redeveloped in the 1980s. The surviving façade is an example of the 1980s "façade-ist" approach to the conservation practice. It is demonstrative of this, now abandoned, understanding of significance based merely on the presentation of an item to the general public. The item meets this criterion on State level.

The place has a strong or special association with a person, or group of persons, of importance of cultural or natural history of New South Wales's history.

The original terrace was a rental property, purchased and modified by Whybrow family in the 1880s, and owned by their relatives until the Government resumptions. The association with the Whybrows family is not considered to meet the threshold of this criterion. The item does not meet this criterion.

The place is important in demonstrating aesthetic characteristics and/or a high degree of creative or technical achievement in New South Wales.

The surviving façade presents with a high degree of architectural integrity and period detailing fully compatible with the surviving Victorian imagery of much of the Gloucester Street. While the building is now used as offices, the appearance of the façade maintains a reference to past residential use, and strongly contributes to the aesthetic character of the streetscape. The building has strong visual relationships with adjacent buildings, including the terraces at 26–30 and 38–40 Gloucester Street, which enhance the presentation of its aesthetic character. The item meets this criterion on Local level.

The place has a strong or special association with a particular community or cultural group in New South Wales for social, cultural or spiritual reasons.

The Gloucester Street Terraces' façades were preserved as a consequence of the activities of the Green Bans movement. Since the resumption of the area by the Government, the original terraces were occupied by the working class renters and associated with series of activities of the Government aiming to improve social condition of the residents, e.g. fixed rents established by the Fair Rents Act which made long term renting affordable, and allowed many tenants to stay at the same residence for years.

The place has potential to yield information that will contribute to an understanding of the cultural or natural history of New South Wales.

It is considered that any such potential of the original structure was lost due to the extensive excavations and demolition of the houses behind the façade line c. 1986, however, the façade was identified by the National Trust to be of potential interest for further research of evolution of terrace houses' façade forms in NSW. The item meets this criterion on State level.

The place possesses uncommon, rare or endangered aspects of the cultural or natural history of New South Wales.

The surviving façades are remnant of an item built to a unique design, albeit within the characteristic architectural style of its date of creation. The item meets this criterion on Local level.

The place is important in demonstrating the principal characteristics of a class of cultural or natural places/environments in New South Wales.

The surviving façade is representative of the architectural style of the terraces, and this design was noted in the studies of the National Trust on development of terrace houses in Australia. The item meets this criterion on State level.

=== 38–40 Gloucester Street ===
As at 1 April 2011, the terrace façade at 38–40 Gloucester Street and its site are of State heritage significance for their historical and scientific cultural values. The site and remnant structure are also of State heritage significance for their contribution to The Rocks area which is of State heritage significance in its own right.

The site of the Terrace Façade at 38–40 Gloucester Street has historical significance due to its continual occupation since the 1850s. The Terrace façade is part of a row of terrace house façades along Gloucester Street at Nos 26–72 (excluding Nos. 42–44, demolished in 1985), which remain basically externally unaltered in appearance since their construction. As part of this row the façade at 38–40 Gloucester Street demonstrates "a rare juxtaposed study of the English terrace house form and its evolution as translated in Australia", (as identified by the National Trust). The changes which the façade survived have the ability to demonstrate a significant part of the story of The Rocks over time, including the civic improvements by the NSW Government, including the 1980s redevelopment of the site to create an office block, when the Government involvement resulted in the design that incorporated the Terrace Façade into the new structure. These changes demonstrate various attitudes to heritage conservation policy and practice in different periods, and demonstrate the impact of resident and community action on the Government policies for the retention of buildings in The Rocks.

Terrace was listed on the New South Wales State Heritage Register on 10 May 2002 having satisfied the following criteria.

The place is important in demonstrating the course, or pattern, of cultural or natural history in New South Wales.

The remnant façade of the Terrace at 38–40 Gloucester Street provides evidence of the street levels before the major realignment in 1911, through the former terrace floor levels located on the Gloucester Street lower level. The surviving façade fabric provides evidence of the design of terrace houses in Australia in the Victorian period. The fabric demonstrates the residential character of The Rocks in the Victorian period. The original creation of the terrace was part of the speculative housing developments, built to generate rental income c. 1883. The terrace was subjected to resumption by the Government in 1900, used as working class accommodation after that date and redeveloped in the 1980s. The surviving façade is an example of the 1980s "façade-ist" approach to the conservation practice. It is demonstrative of this, now abandoned, understanding of significance based merely on the presentation of an item to the general public. The item meets this criterion on State level.

The place has a strong or special association with a person, or group of persons, of importance of cultural or natural history of New South Wales's history.

The original terrace was a rental property, used as a boarding house by a series of owners and tenants, none of which left a particularly identifiable mark in the local history. The item does not meet this criterion.

The place is important in demonstrating aesthetic characteristics and/or a high degree of creative or technical achievement in New South Wales.

The surviving façade presents with a high degree of architectural integrity and its period detailing is fully compatible with the surviving Victorian imagery of much of the Gloucester Street. While the building is now used as offices, the appearance of the façade maintains a reference to past residential use, and strongly contributes to the aesthetic character of the streetscape. The building has strong visual relationships with adjacent buildings, including the terraces at 26-30 and 32-36 Gloucester Street, which enhance the presentation of its aesthetic character. The item meets this criterion on Local level.

The place has a strong or special association with a particular community or cultural group in New South Wales for social, cultural or spiritual reasons.

The Gloucester Street Terraces' façades were preserved as a consequence of the activities of the Green Bans movement. Since the resumption of the area by the Government, the original terraces were occupied by the working class renters and associated with series of activities of the Government aiming to improve social condition of the residents, e.g. fixed rents established by the Fair Rents Act which made long term renting affordable, and allowed many tenants to stay at the same residence for years.

The place has potential to yield information that will contribute to an understanding of the cultural or natural history of New South Wales.

It is considered that any such potential of the original houses was lost due to the extensive excavations and demolition of the houses behind the façade line c.1986, however, the façade was identified by the National Trust to be of potential interest for further research of evolution of terrace houses' façade forms in NSW. The item meets this criterion on State level.

The place possesses uncommon, rare or endangered aspects of the cultural or natural history of New South Wales.

The surviving façades are remnant of an item built to a unique design, albeit within the characteristic architectural style of its date of creation. The item meets this criterion on Local level.

The place is important in demonstrating the principal characteristics of a class of cultural or natural places/environments in New South Wales.

The surviving façade is representative of the architectural style of the terraces, and this design was noted in the studies of the National Trust on development of the terrace houses in Australia. The item meets this criterion on State level.

== See also ==
- Australian residential architectural styles
