= 123–125 George Street, The Rocks =

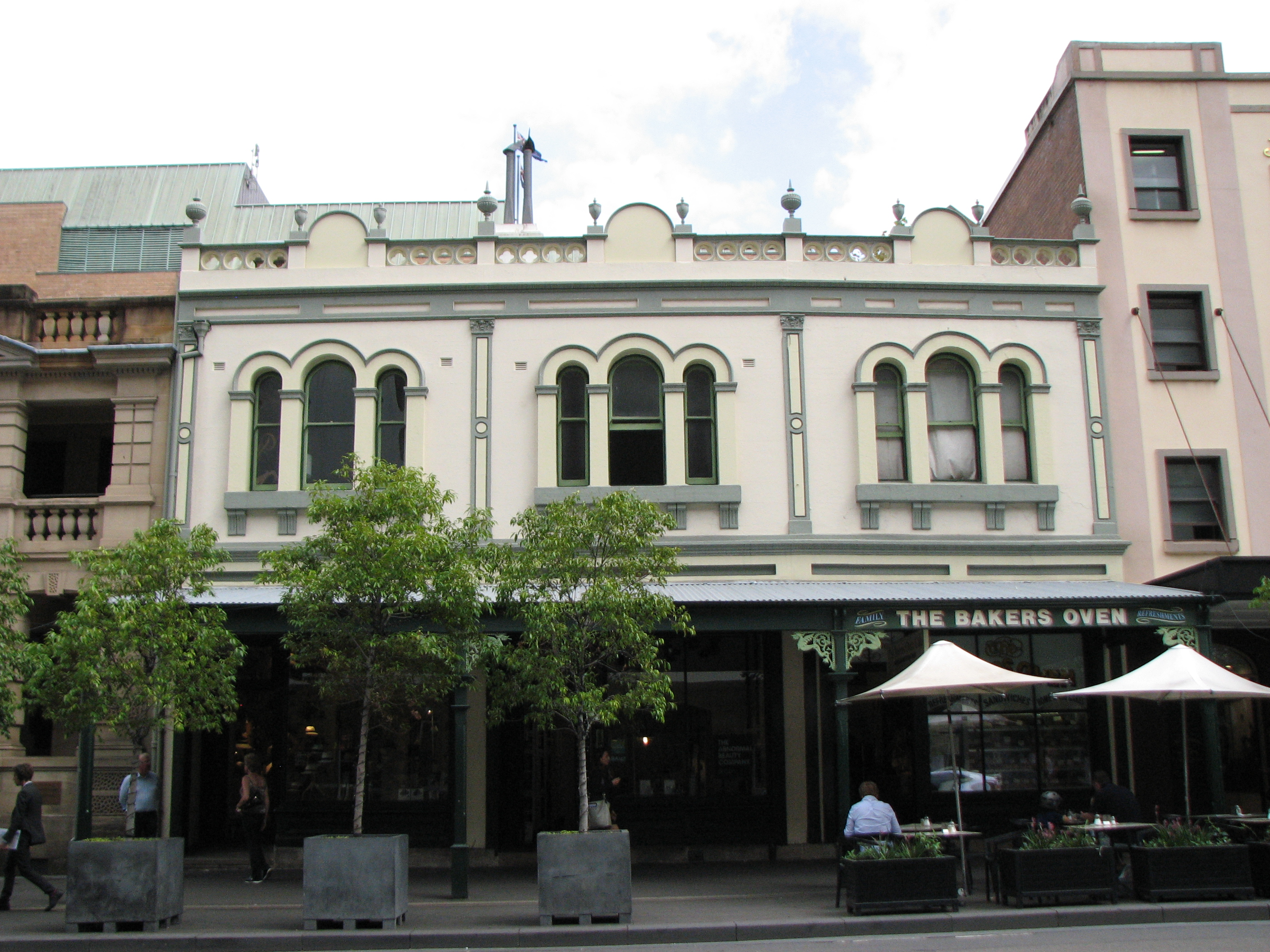
- 123–125 George Street – the lefthand and centre of the three terraced buildings

- Location within Sydney Location within Australia
- 33.8601°S 151.2084°E
- Location: 123–125 George Street, The Rocks, City of Sydney, New South Wales, Australia

History
- Built: 1882
- Built for: Thomas Playfair

Site notes
- Architectural style: Victorian Free Classical
- Owner: Property NSW

New South Wales Heritage Register
- Official name: Shop and Residence
- Type: State heritage (built)
- Designated: 10 May 2002
- Reference no.: 1583
- Type: Shop
- Category: Retail and Wholesale

123–125 George Street, The Rocks are heritage-listed shops and former residences located in the inner Sydney suburb of The Rocks in New South Wales, Australia. It was built for Thomas Playfair during 1882. The property is owned by Property NSW, an agency of the Government of New South Wales. It was added to the New South Wales State Heritage Register on 10 May 2002.

== History ==
William Davis's tenements extended across the land granted to him in 1836. His Town grant of 12 perches on 29 October 1843 remained vacant except for houses to the rear of the property. Davis erected a shop to the George Street frontage of north corner of his 1836 Town grant in c. 1830. This brick walled and shingle roofed shop was added to in 1842 by a similar building to the northern side (extending into land grant of 1834) In 1845 the Sydney Municipal Rate Books described the two single storey shops as having two rooms and the northern premises boundaries being 4 metres (13 ft) wide and 21 metres (68 ft) deep (no. 123) and the other (No. 125) being 4 metres (14 ft) wide and 9 metres (28 ft) deep. Both shops were "in bad repair". The tenements to the rear of 123 were described in 1863 as "old, ruinous and unhealthy". Davis's will of 1843 gave J. Edwards the title to property of the 1834 grant plus part of the 1836 grant. J Edwards conveyed the property to Henry Byrns in 1863. In 1870 W. Hooper, a greengrocer occupied No.123 and T. Barry, bootmaker occupied No.125. The shops continued as a greengrocer, J. Paddon and a bootmaker, J. McAuley, until September 1881 when they and the rear buildings were pulled down. Thomas Playfair purchased the properties from H. Byrns and in 1882 erected two two-storey four roomed shops out of brick and stone walls and iron roof on the sites of No. 123 and 125. J. Paddon continued as a fruiterer in the new shop No. 123 and C. W. Danielson, bootmaker in the other. Shop No. 125 became an outfitter and importer outlet in 1885. Playfair continued as landlord until the NSW Government resumed the property in 1900.

Archaeology notes: Hospital. Granted to William Davis as 12 perches on 29 October 1834.

== Description ==
Three late Victorian two storey shops, built c. 1880 of stuccoed brick. Unusual plainly moulded Romanesque style windows of three bays to the first floor. Two of the shops retain their original shopfronts, while the third has been altered.

Nos. 123 and 125 George Street are near-identical buildings, the timber shop front of 123 being new and a copy of 125 (original). Nos. 123 & 125 are connected internally and operate as one shop. The interior layout is original except for openings between rooms. Most ceilings are modern, original joinery generally remains. The decorative sheet metal parapet wall is a "replica" (c. 1970s?) of the damaged original masonry parapet. No. 121 is an original shop front of a different type to 123 & 125.

Style: Victorian Free Classical; Storeys: 2; Facade: Brick & stone walls; Roof Cladding: Corrugated iron; Floor Frame: Timber.

=== Condition ===
As at 27 April 2001, Archaeology Assessment Condition: Partly disturbed. Assessment Basis: Floors level with George Street, terraced up to former level of Nurses Walk. Recent building techniques (Bakehouse Place).

== Heritage listing ==
As at 31 March 2011, this pair of shops and residence and site are of State heritage significance for their historical and scientific cultural values. The site and building are also of State heritage significance for their contribution to The Rocks area which is of State Heritage significance in its own right. Numbers 123 to 125 are associated with Thomas Playfair, Mayor of Sydney in 1885. Playfair was involved in the profitable marine trade and invested in property in the local area, of which 121 George Street is one such property. Significant aspects of the building include the architectural form and detail including the original/recreated shopfronts. Internally, the remaining original layout and other features including joinery, fireplaces and stairs etc. which contribute to the significance of the pair.

Shop and Residence was listed on the New South Wales State Heritage Register on 10 May 2002 having satisfied the following criteria.

The place is important in demonstrating the course, or pattern, of cultural or natural history in New South Wales.

This pair of shops and residence and site are of State heritage significance for their historical and scientific cultural values. The site and building are also of State heritage significance for their contribution to The Rocks area which is of State Heritage significance in its own right. Numbers 123 to 125 George Street were built in 1882 as commercial premises as part of the business precinct lining the harbour-side of The Rocks, and are associated with the evolving pattern of urban fabric in the area.

The place has a strong or special association with a person, or group of persons, of importance of cultural or natural history of New South Wales's history.

Numbers 123 to 125 are associated with Thomas Playfair, Mayor of Sydney in 1885. Playfair was involved in the profitable marine trade and invested in property in the local area, of which 121 George Street is one such property.

The place is important in demonstrating aesthetic characteristics and/or a high degree of creative or technical achievement in New South Wales.

The buildings' facades are fine examples of the Victorian Free Classical style, executed to give a sense of decorum to what would otherwise have been simple commercial / residential structures. The buildings have streetscape value as two buildings in a group of three that were designed to appear as one property. The buildings' scale and alignment to the street are typical of that found along the business precinct of George Street in The Rocks area. The street façades have remained relatively intact since they were constructed in 1882.

The place has a strong or special association with a particular community or cultural group in New South Wales for social, cultural or spiritual reasons.

The buildings have had a continuous commercial use since they were built in 1882. They have been used as fruit shops, ham and beef shops, smallgoods shops, a wine depot, a bookmaker's, importers' offices, outfitters, and, in 1933, No 123 was used by a pest extermination company. The site retains elements of combined shops and residences, once common throughout both The Rocks and Sydney in general.

The place has potential to yield information that will contribute to an understanding of the cultural or natural history of New South Wales.

The fabric, although somewhat modified, has the ability to yield information on the configuration of late Victorian commercial/residential buildings and aspects of the way of life of the people who inhabited them.

The place possesses uncommon, rare or endangered aspects of the cultural or natural history of New South Wales.

The site has high potential to reveal further subsurface archaeological deposits associated with the early European occupation of the site and the surrounding area.

The place is important in demonstrating the principal characteristics of a class of cultural or natural places/environments in New South Wales.

The buildings at 123 and 125 George street are expressive of the close weaving of the social fabric of The Rocks area in the nineteenth century, and demonstrate the close links between the residential and commercial activities of the community.

== See also ==
- Australian residential architectural styles
