= Samson's Cottage =

Heritage building in Sydney, Australia

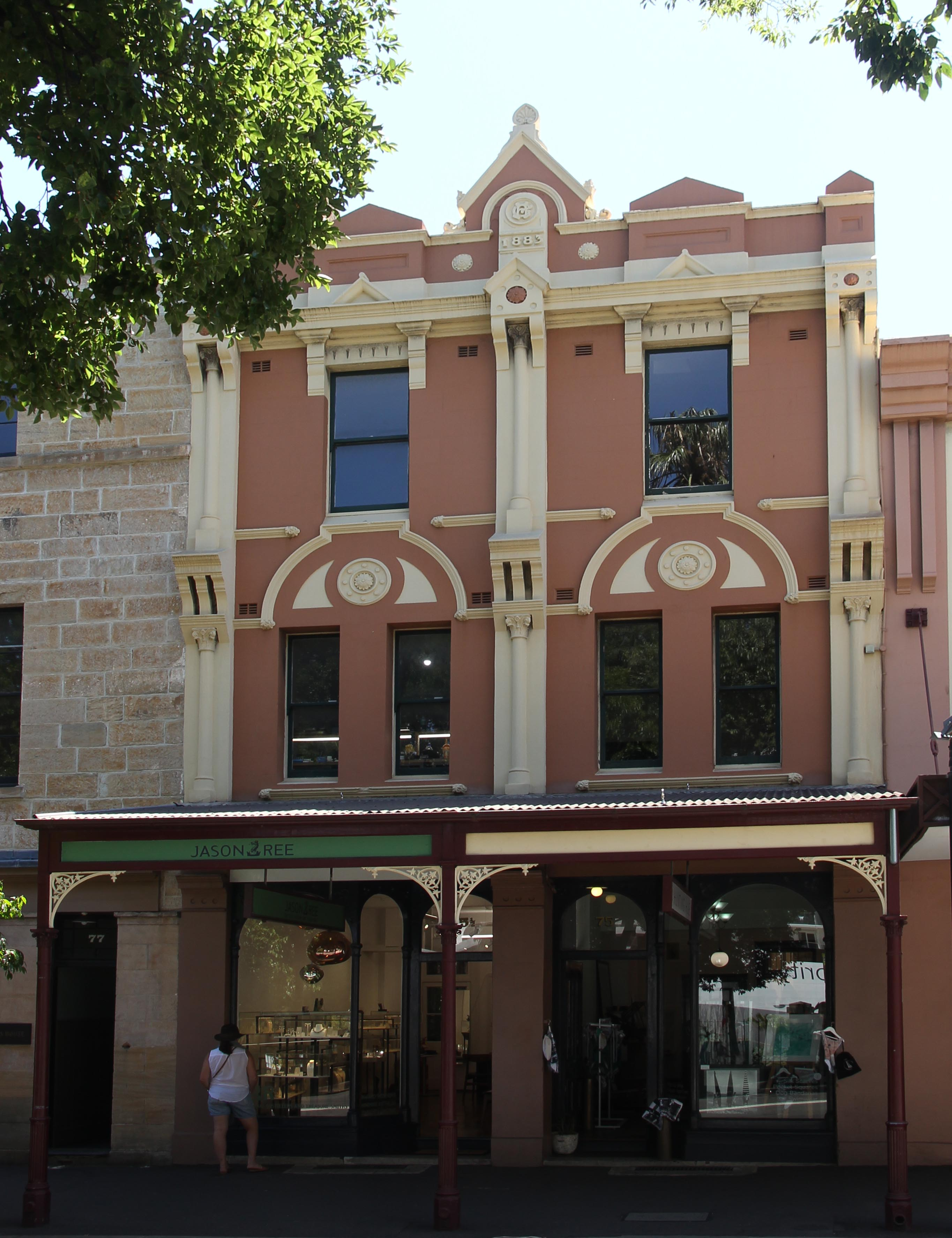
- Samson's Cottage, pictured in 2019, operating as retail outlets.

- Location within Sydney Location within Australia
- 33.8587°S 151.2087°E
- Location: 75–75.5 George Street, The Rocks, City of Sydney, New South Wales, Australia

History
- Built: 1883–
- Built for: William Cormack

Site notes
- Owner: Property NSW

New South Wales Heritage Register
- Official name: Samson's Cottage
- Type: State heritage (built)
- Designated: 10 May 2002
- Reference no.: 1597
- Type: Shop
- Category: Commercial

Samson's Cottage is a historic building in Sydney, Australia. It was built for William Cormack and built from 1883, and over the years, it has housed a Chinese laundry, an art gallery and an antique shop. It is located at 75–75.5 George Street in the inner city suburb of The Rocks in the City of Sydney local government area. The property is owned by Property NSW, an agency of the Government of New South Wales. It was added to the New South Wales State Heritage Register on 10 May 2002.

== History ==
In 1790 this parcel of land was part of the proposed second stage of Sydney Hospital. William Balmain was granted a lease which included this lot, and by 1807 he had released the property to the Government. By March 1837 William Carr and George John Rogers were trustees of the property and in October 1838 Sir George Gipps granted the land to Carr and Rogers.

In February 1839 Frederic Wright Unwin became the owner of the property and on 21 June 1843 conveyed lot 7 of the subdivision of Lots 1 & 2 of Section 85 to William Samson, a stevedore. Samson completed the erection of a two-storey house to the rear of the lot in 1844. The three roomed house was constructed of stone and brick walls and the roof was clad in shingles. In 1853 Samson erected a single storey shop containing three rooms to George Street frontage. The shop walls were constructed out of "Wood and Brick" and the roof was shingled. The Cottage of William and Martha Samson was considered "large" by the rating assessors in 1858.

In 1882 Martha Samson sold Lot 7 to William Cope and Cunningham Archibald Atchison and in the year they conveyed the Cottage and shop to Alexander William Cormack, importer, of Snails Bay near Sydney. Tenants of the shop until 1882 (when it was demolished) were fruiterers and grocers. In 1882-83 the shop to George Street was pulled down and during 1883 Cormack erected a three-storey building containing two shops to George Street and lodging rooms over. The walls were constructed in brick and the roof clad with iron. The premises was divided into two tenements, each with nine rooms and were numbered 75 and 75.5. The tenants of the shops until 1900 (till they were resumed by the Government) were tobacconists, hairdresser, confectioner and bootmaker.

Archaeology notes: Lease to William Balmain by 1800. Lease to William Gaudry, January 1810. Granted as Lot 2, Section 85 to William Carr and G. J. Rogers, solicitors, as trustees for James Shepherd, Richard Wood, Nathaniel Dermot, James Webber and Edmund Pontifex, assignees of estate of John Plummer and William Wilson, formerly Fenchurch Street, London, merchants and bankrupts. George Street frontage not developed until 1883.

=== Samson's Cottage wall remains ===
In 1916, 75.5 George Street was leased as a household to Hong On Jang, a shipping provider (Sand's Directory). It is assumed that he was recognised to have elite social status of a merchant, perhaps similar but not to the extent of Quong Tart. As a shipping provider, he was linked between the source of supply and visiting ships and would have interacted with the European community. Jane Lydon notes the coincidence that Hong On Jang as a shipping provider (1916 - 1924) coincides with the operating years of the Australian-China Mail Steamship.

Hong On Jang also offered board to his countrymen on his premises, first at his Harrington Street residency between 1904–11 and later on George Street from 1916 - 24. He was involved with the S.S Courtfield incident where on Christmas Day, 1908, the Collector of Customs sent a telegram to the Melbourne Head Office regarding eight Chinese stowaways found on the S.S Courtfield. The ship had arrived in Sydney from Hong Kong and through an interpreter, they were able to extract the information that these men were from rural Southern China and had arranged through a stranger in Hong Kong to come to Australia. The stowaways claimed that they did not know who was to meet them in Sydney but letters found on board were addressed to Hong On Jang in George Street asking him to house them until they could be sent further inland Sydney to their relatives. To resolve this incident, Chinese merchants of Sydney rallied together and raised 100pounds to send the men back on the first ship to China. This incident obviously did not tarnish Hong On Jang's reputation as other shipping companies (1910: Eastern and Australian Steamship Co. Ltd.; 1911 Norddeutscher Lloyd, P.P. Lohmann and Co., General Agents; 1911 Gibbs Bright and Co.) made requests to the Collector of Customs to allow Chinese passengers on their ships to board in Harrington Street temporarily before sailing to their final destination.

An archaeological excavation of the rear yard of 75.5 George Street was conducted by Lydon in 1990 and objects recovered demonstrate that there was a period of Chinese occupation in the early 20th century. Lydon later wrote that while the archaeological record of Chinese occupation in Sydney is limited, she singles out 75.5 George Street as the exception. Her investigation shows that the boarders lived in a shed in the yard of 75.5 George Street. A large amount of Chinese ceramics (mainly storage vessels and also celadon rice bowls, stone ware "ginger-jars" and a stoneware 'sand-pot') were recovered and Lydon noted that majority of the Chinese ware was not intended for a foreign market. European ceramics were also recovered along with a large amount of glass alcohol bottles and thirty-eight small glass vials with their necks snapped off. The glass vials have the Chinese characters "Tung Kwan Kok" printed on their bases and are assumed to be the maker's mark. These small vials were once thought to hold opium but are now believed to have held medicinal products. Since opium was banned in 1901 and was often used in patent painkillers and medicinal tinctures, it is suggested that addicts may have had resorted to opium-based products. Dolly Bonnet, who grew up in The Rocks during the 1920s, recalls that Chinese men would smoke opium in Kendall Lane, however, no artefacts associated with opium smoking such as opium pipes were recovered from 75.5 George Street.

Sheep bones along with a handful of pig, rabbit and cattle bones were also found from this period. Fish bones dominate the faunal assemblage including snapper, bream and wirrah cod and with the recovery of the "sand-pot", which was used for cooking rice as well as braising and making stews, it can be suggested that the traditional Chinese diet of fish and rice was upheld in 75.5 George Street, with the occasional supplement of meat. "Sand-pots" have rarely been found in an archaeological context outside of China. Its single presence at 75.5 George Street has led Lydon to also suggest that the custom of sharing food in order to create bonds between the Chinese were upheld in Hong On Jang's household.

Hong On Jang (or Que On Jang, who is listed as the occupant in the 1923 - 24 Sands Directory) ended his lease of 75.5 George Street in 1924. The building was then leased out to European tenants.

In 1944, 75 George Street was utilised as a Chinese laundry and residence. Dolly Bonnet recalls the laundry drying out the back of Kendall Lane. According to the SCA Tenancy Cards and SCA property files, the tenant between 1946–47 was Soo Tim. The business along with the fittings was sold to Henry James in 1947. It is unknown whether Henry James was European or of Chinese descent but the painted sign "Chinese Laundry" remained on the windows, James was open for business until 1974. George Auchinachie, an antique dealer, was the next occupant in 1975 and he operated under the name of "Chinese Laundry Antiques".

== Description ==
No 75-75.5 George Street is a pair of late Victorian shops having ornate well scaled stuccoed facades with projecting cornice and parapet above. A small pediment with the date 1883 rises above the parapet between the two facades. Pilasters decorated with columns, Corinthian capitals and cornices rise to the full height of the façade separating them from the two adjacent buildings and dividing the two shops. Style: Victorian; Storeys: 3 plus Basement; Roof Cladding: Iron; Floor Frame: Timber

Archaeology Notes: Building on George Street, 1883. Vestige of earlier building on Kendall Lane, brick side walls at first floor level. Wall remains (c. 1840) incorporated into new building in 1992.; Built By: 1840s

=== Condition ===
As at 23 July 1999, good – extensive amount of fabric of exceptional/considerable significance.

Archaeology Assessment Condition: partly disturbed. Assessment Basis: basements to building on George Street. Otherwise surviving vestiges of former buildings. Deposits probably survive between buildings. Investigation: Full excavation of cottage High degree of integrity. Archaeology partly disturbed.

=== Modifications and dates ===
- 1997 (75.5)
- 1998 (75)

== Heritage listing ==
As at 31 March 2011, this pair of Victorian shops and site are of State heritage significance for their historical and scientific cultural values. The site and building are also of State heritage significance for their contribution to The Rocks area which is of State Heritage significance in its own right.

The buildings are located in an area which has been continuously settled since the arrival of Europeans in Australia, and the site has been more or less in continuous use as shops with attached residences/lodgings since its construction in the Victorian Period. It has been added to an 1840s building and contains elements of the 1840s which had been intended for an earlier building. It therefore illustrates the historic process of urban development and, in this particular case, of non-development due to economic circumstances in the 1840s. It demonstrates how early settlers of modest means were able to acquire land and develop it gradually prior to the economic boom of the late 1850s. Its bipartite division demonstrates a closer settlement and development of the land and together with Samson's Cottage wall remains illustrates the development of Sydney at ever higher densities. The loss of the rear yards to public use has destroyed evidence of its former residential use. This increasing public pedestrianisation of formerly private areas both lessens the site's significance and increases the importance of maintaining what little of the site is left.

Its façade is well-modelled on Victorian mannerist façade which is an important, rare mannerist contribution to the streetscape of George Street North.

It is an important component of George Street North and complements the buildings of different periods in the immediate vicinity.

The method of construction, especially the manner in which the 1880s building has made use of the 1840s building to its south for support, illustrates the techniques of construction of the period. As the site has been in almost continuous use by Europeans for two centuries the ground under the building yield archaeological evidence of the land's earlier occupation.

Samsons Cottage should also be considered to have high Chinese cultural value and significance due to its utilisation as a boarding house by Hong On Jang during the early 20th century. Hong On Jang provided accommodation to Chinese sojourners and passer-throughs.

An archaeological excavation conducted in 1990 of the rear yard of Samson's Cottage further contributes to its Chinese cultural significance. Chinese objects found in situ around Sydney were considered to be a rare discovery and large amounts of Chinese ceramics, which were not intended for export outside of China, were recovered from the rear yard.

From 1944 until 1974, 75 George Street was utilised as a Chinese laundry, one of the occupations adopted by Chinese sojourners who made the decision to remain in Australia.

Samson's Cottage was listed on the New South Wales State Heritage Register on 10 May 2002 having satisfied the following criteria.

The place is important in demonstrating the course, or pattern, of cultural or natural history in New South Wales.

It has been more or less in continuous use as shops with attached residences/lodgings since its construction in the Victorian Period. In this regard, its degree of significance is representative of the area.

It has been added to an 1840s building and contains elements of the 1840s which had been intended for an earlier building. It therefore illustrates the historic process of urban development and, in this particular case, of non-development due to economic circumstances in the 1840s. In this regard, its degree of significance is rare in the area.

It demonstrates how early settlers of modest means were able to acquire land and develop it gradually prior to the economic boom of the late 1850s. In this regard, its degree of significance is representative in the area.

Its bipartite division demonstrates a closer settlement and development of the land and, together with Samson's Cottage wall remains illustrates the development of Sydney at ever higher densities. In this regard, its degree of significance is representative in the area.

The loss of the rear yards to public use has destroyed evidence of its former residential use. This increasing public pedestrianisation of formerly private areas both lessens the site's significance and increases the importance of maintaining what little of the site is left. In these regards, its degree of significance is representative in the area.

Samsons Cottage wall remains: 75.5 George Street can be considered to have high Historical Significance due to the unique archaeological assemblage recovered from the 1990 excavation. Whilst archaeological evidence of Chinese inhabitancy has rarely been found in Sydney, this building is an exception. Chinese ceramics found contemporary to this period are recognised as being rare and were not intended to be exported out of China (e.g. 'sand-pot').

Fish bones, which dominated the bones assemblage, indicate that the Chinese traditional diet of fish was maintained and occasionally supplemented with lamb, rabbit and cattle. The discovery of the "sand-pot" (used for cooking rice and also braising and stew) has led Lydon to believe that the inhabitants dined together, one of the traditional methods to form a bond within the household.

Glass alcohol bottles recovered has also led Lydon to the conclusion that the Chinese inhabitants were adopting a social aspect of Australian culture. Alcohol was only consumed for medicinal purposes or at religious occasions in China. This is not to imply the assimilation of culture but rather the access to a larger market.

The place has a strong or special association with a person, or group of persons, of importance of cultural or natural history of New South Wales's history.

Samsons Cottage wall remains: 75.5 George Street is associated with Hong On Jang, a Chinese merchant and shipping provider. Hong On Jang regularly boarded his countrymen within his household at his Harrington Street residence between 1904–11 and at 75.5 George Street between 1916–24. He was also involved with the S.S. Courtfield incident when 8 stowaways from China were found on board along with letters addressed to him, asking for him to temporarily board these men.

As a Chinese merchant, Hong On Jang would have been recognised as being part of an elite class. He was a link between the source of supply and visited ships and it is assumed he would have had regular interaction with the European community.

The place is important in demonstrating aesthetic characteristics and/or a high degree of creative or technical achievement in New South Wales.

The building's George Street façade features a Victorian Mannerist design, which is uncommon for the George Street North area.

It is an important component of George Street North and complements the buildings of different periods in the immediate vicinity. In this regard, its degree of significance is representative in the area.

The place has a strong or special association with a particular community or cultural group in New South Wales for social, cultural or spiritual reasons.

Samsons Cottage wall remains: 75.5 George Street is of high social significance due to the artefacts recovered from its rear yard. Archaeological evidence of Chinese inhabitancy is rarely found in Sydney and Chinese ceramics that are seldom found outside of China were recovered. It is speculated by Lydon that the ceramics recovered (i.e. 'sand-pot') that within the Hong On Jang household the traditional custom of sharing meals was practised in order to create a social bond.

75.5 George Street is also socially significance because of its previous function as a boarding house. Hong On Jang provided accommodation to labourers who worked within the vicinity of The Rocks and also to Chinese sojourners passing through Sydney.

The place has potential to yield information that will contribute to an understanding of the cultural or natural history of New South Wales.

The method of construction, especially the manner in which the 1880s building has made use of the 1840s building to its south for support, illustrates the techniques of construction of the period. In this regard, its degree of significance is rare in the area.

As the site has been in almost continuous use by Europeans and Chinese for two centuries the ground under the building which was not removed for the current could yield archaeological evidence of the land's earlier occupation. In this regard, its degree of significance is representative in the area.

Samsons Cottage: 75.5 George Street has the potential to assist with future research on Chinese households and its archaeological assemblage can provide a comparison for any other future discoveries within Australia

The place possesses uncommon, rare or endangered aspects of the cultural or natural history of New South Wales.

The Chinese assemblage recovered from an archaeological excavation of its rear yard is considered to be a rare find within Sydney and some ceramic objects such as the "sand-pot" are seldom found outside of China.

The place is important in demonstrating the principal characteristics of a class of cultural or natural places/environments in New South Wales.

75.5 George Street is representative of a boarding facilities set up for the Chinese sojourner who came to make a living in Sydney.

70 George Street, which was used as a Chinese laundry between 1944 - 1974, is representative of one of the Chinese occupations taken up by Chinese sojourners who made the decision to remain in Australia. Other occupations include market gardeners and vendors and cooks.

== See also ==
- Old Ambulance Station, The Rocks
- Raphael Mackeller Stores
- Samson's Cottage wall remains
- Unwin's Stores
