= Pitt (ship) =

Several ships have been named Pitt:

- Pitt (1799 ship) was launched at Ulverston and proceeded to sail to the West Indies and New York. A French privateer captured her in 1806 but she quickly returned to British ownership and sailed as a West Indiaman. She continued trading with the West Indies and North America until she was last listed in 1833.
- Pitt (1802 ship) was launched in 1800 in "America", probably under a different name, or possibly as Pitt, but in New Providence. She first appeared in British records in 1802. She then traded as a West Indiaman between 1808 and 1811 she may have served the British Royal Navy in South America as a hired armed brig. From 1812 she traded with the Iberian Peninsula and possibly the Baltic. She was last listed in 1818.

== See also ==
- HMS Pitt, any of several warships of the British Royal Navy
- Pitt (East Indiaman)
- William Pitt (ship)
