= Samson's Cottage wall remains =

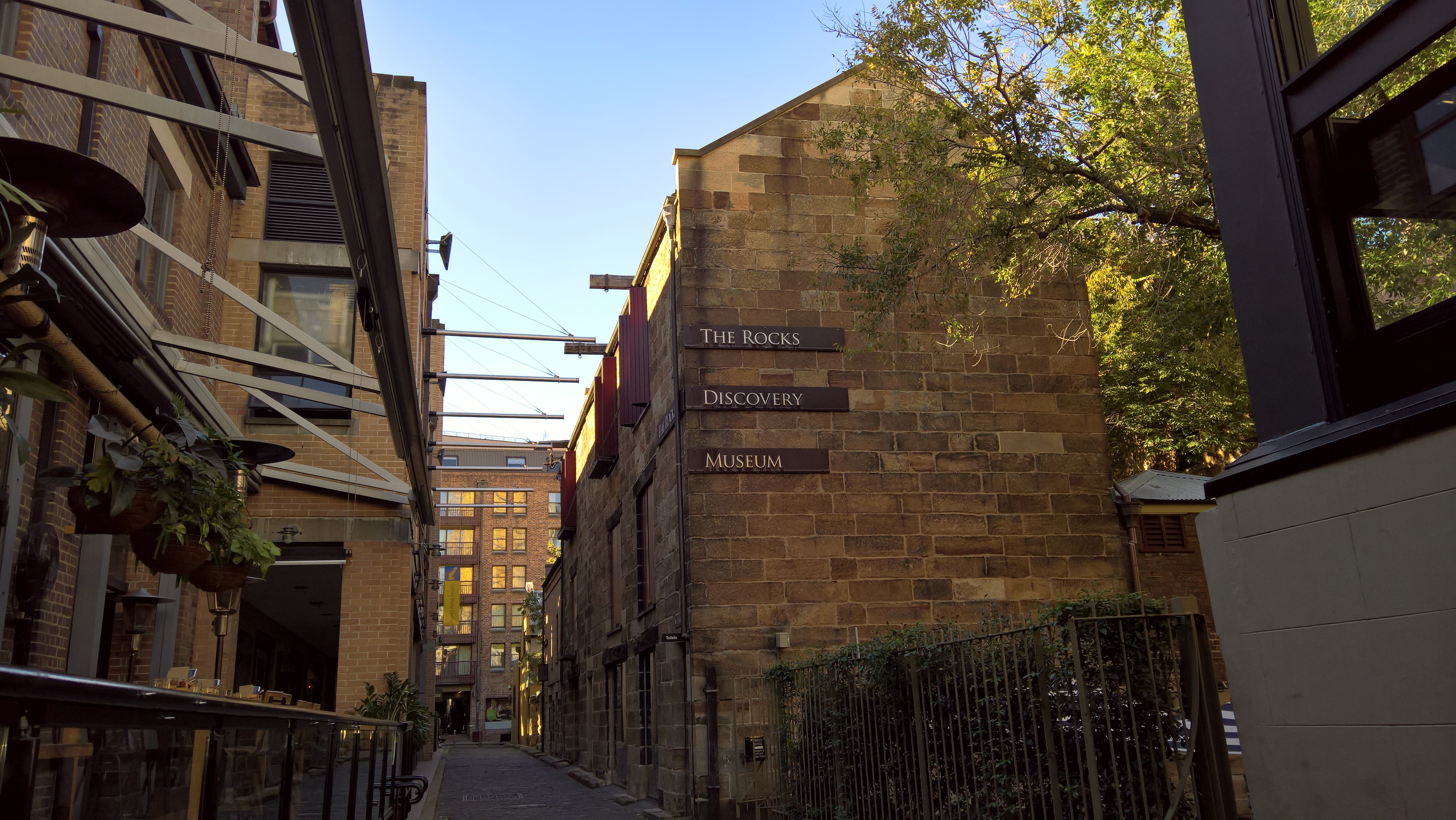
- Samson's Cottage wall remains, 8 Kendall Lane, The Rocks, NSW. Foreground portion of the building on the right.

- Location within Sydney Location within Australia
- 33.8587°S 151.2088°E
- Location: 8 Kendall Lane, The Rocks, City of Sydney, New South Wales, Australia

History
- Built: 1844
- Built for: William Samson

Site notes
- Owner: Property NSW

New South Wales Heritage Register
- Official name: Samson's Cottage (wall remains); Puppet Cottage (Samsons)
- Type: State heritage (built)
- Designated: 10 May 2002
- Reference no.: 1577
- Type: Shop
- Category: Retail and Wholesale

Samson's Cottage wall remains is a heritage-listed former residence and now retail building located at 8 Kendall Lane, in the inner city Sydney suburb of The Rocks in the City of Sydney local government area of New South Wales, Australia. It was built for William Samson in 1844. It is also known as Samson's Cottage (wall remains) and Puppet Cottage (Samsons). The property is owned by Property NSW, an agency of the Government of New South Wales. It was added to the New South Wales State Heritage Register on 10 May 2002.

== History ==
In 1790 this parcel of land was part of the proposed 2nd stage of Sydney Hospital. William Balmain was granted a lease which included this lot, and by 1807 he had released the property to the Government. By March 1837 William Carr and George John Rogers were trustees of the property and in October 1838 Sir George Gipps granted the land to Carr and Rogers. In February 1839 Frederic Wright Unwin became the owner of the property and on 21 June 1843 conveyed lot 7 of the subdivision of Lots 1 & 2 of Section 85 to William Samson, a stevedore.

Samson completed the erection of a two-storey house to the rear of the lot in 1844. The three roomed house was constructed of stone and brick walls and the roof was clad in shingles. In 1853 Samson erected a single storey shop containing three rooms to George Street frontage. The shop walls were constructed out of "Wood and Brick" and the roof was shingled. The Cottage of William and Martha Samson was considered "large" by the rating assessors in 1858. In 1882 Martha Samson sold Lot 7 to William Cope and Cunningham Archibald Atchison and in the same year they conveyed the Cottage and shop to Alexander William Cormack.

In 1882–83 the shop on George Street was pulled down and during 1883 Cormack erected a three-storey building containing two shops to George Street and lodging rooms over. The walls were constructed in brick and the roof clad with iron. The premises was divided into two tenements, each with nine rooms and were numbered 75 and 75.5. The southern wall of Samson's cottage formed part of the wall to Joseph Raphael's store and stable constructed 1853. The remaining walls are a very good indication of the house's former size and materials used.

In 1991–92 a new infill building was constructed on the site of Samsons Cottage incorporating the remaining sections of the former house. The form of the new building is similar to that of the original cottage, built in 1844 and demolished in the 1920s. The small mezzanine area was located to give visitors an unimpeded view of the south wall of the original cottage contained within the new building. Archaeological work before construction revealed foundations and valuable historical information. The building, designed as a multi purpose space, was the location of The Rocks Puppet Cottage from 1992-2005 (a free to visit initiative funded by the Sydney Harbour Foreshore Authority) and since 2006 is currently being used as The Rocks Discovery Museum.

== Description ==
The original two storey cottage had stone and brick walls and a shingle roof and was pulled down in 1883, however parts of the northern, western and southern walls of the building still remain. The southern wall of Samson's cottage formed part of the wall to Joseph Raphael's store and stable, constructed in 1853. The cottage has been rebuilt in 1991-2 in its original form.

Storeys: Two; Facade: Stone (1844); Brick (1991); Side Rear Walls: Stone and brick walls (1844); Roof Cladding: Shingle (1844); Iron (c.1880)

=== Modifications and dates ===
- 1883: Cottage partially demolished.
- 1991–92: The remaining sections of the north, west and south walls of the original building were incorporated into a new infill building. A small terrace was constructed at the rear, overlooking the courtyard system, which was extensively repaved and landscaped. The toilet block was upgraded to provide public toilets.
- 2005: Conservation and adaptive reuse of the building for the Rocks Discovery Museum involved cutting a doorway in the upper wall and building overhead walkway to enable disabled access to the 2nd floor of the museum. A lift was installed and overhead loft built to enable a research area for the museum.

== Heritage listing ==
As at 31 March 2011, Samson's Cottage (wall remains) and site are of State heritage significance for their historical and scientific cultural values. The site and building are also of State heritage significance for their contribution to The Rocks area which is of State Heritage significance in its own right.

The remaining walls portray extremely well the development of the site and adjoining property in a rare visual cut away section. The scale, form, colour, texture, and material of the fabric are all conveyed very well. Illustrative of the changing development and growth of the residential and commercial, and industrial precinct of The Rocks and Sydney, it contributes greatly to the streetscape and rear courtyards. The rear courtyard portrays the early subdivision pattern of the 1840s by Unwin. It is an example of mixed usage with an early residence in a commercial and later industrial precinct with the construction of the Kendall Factory. The remaining walls clearly indicate the scale and fabric of this "large" two storey 1844 residence of William Samson. The height of the building, the steep pitch of the gable roof and type of materials used, are all evident from the remaining fabric. The southern wall of the residence which has been built into the Coach house is significant in illustrating the position of the fireplace, and its later extension with the construction of the Coach house. The stone wall to Kendall Lane and the distinct remaining impression of the south wall contributes the existing streetscape to the Lane. The remains of the cottage effectively illustrates the early practice of building common or party walls. In particular the incorporation of the southern and northern wall of Samson's cottage into the Coach house and Ambulance station. The typical construction method of a residence in an easily identifiable cross section form.

Samson's Cottage wall remains was listed on the New South Wales State Heritage Register on 10 May 2002 having satisfied the following criteria.

The place is important in demonstrating the course, or pattern, of cultural or natural history in New South Wales.

The rear courtyard portrays the early subdivision pattern of the 1840s by Unwin. It is an example of mixed usage with an early residence in a commercial and later industrial precinct with the construction of the Kendall Factory.

The place is important in demonstrating aesthetic characteristics and/or a high degree of creative or technical achievement in New South Wales.

The remaining walls clearly indicate the scale and fabric of this "large" two storey 1844 residence of William Samson. The height of the building, the steep pitch of the gable roof and type of materials used, are all evident from the remaining fabric. The southern wall of the residence which has been built into the Coach house is significant in illustrating the position of the fireplace, and its later extension with the construction of the Coach house. The stone wall to Kendall Lane and the distinct remaining impression of the south wall contributes the existing streetscape to the Lane.

The place has a strong or special association with a particular community or cultural group in New South Wales for social, cultural or spiritual reasons.

Example of a residence located to the rear of a commercial block with a single storey shop to the front built in 1853.

The place has potential to yield information that will contribute to an understanding of the cultural or natural history of New South Wales.

The remains of the cottage effectively illustrates the early practice of building common or party walls. In particular the incorporation of the southern and northern wall of Samson's cottage into the Coach house and Ambulance station. The typical construction method of a residence in an easily identifiable cross section form.

== See also ==
- Raphael Mackeller Stores
- Samson's Cottage
- Media related to Samson's Cottage wall remains at Wikimedia Commons
