= Unwin's Stores =

Heritage building in Sydney, Australia

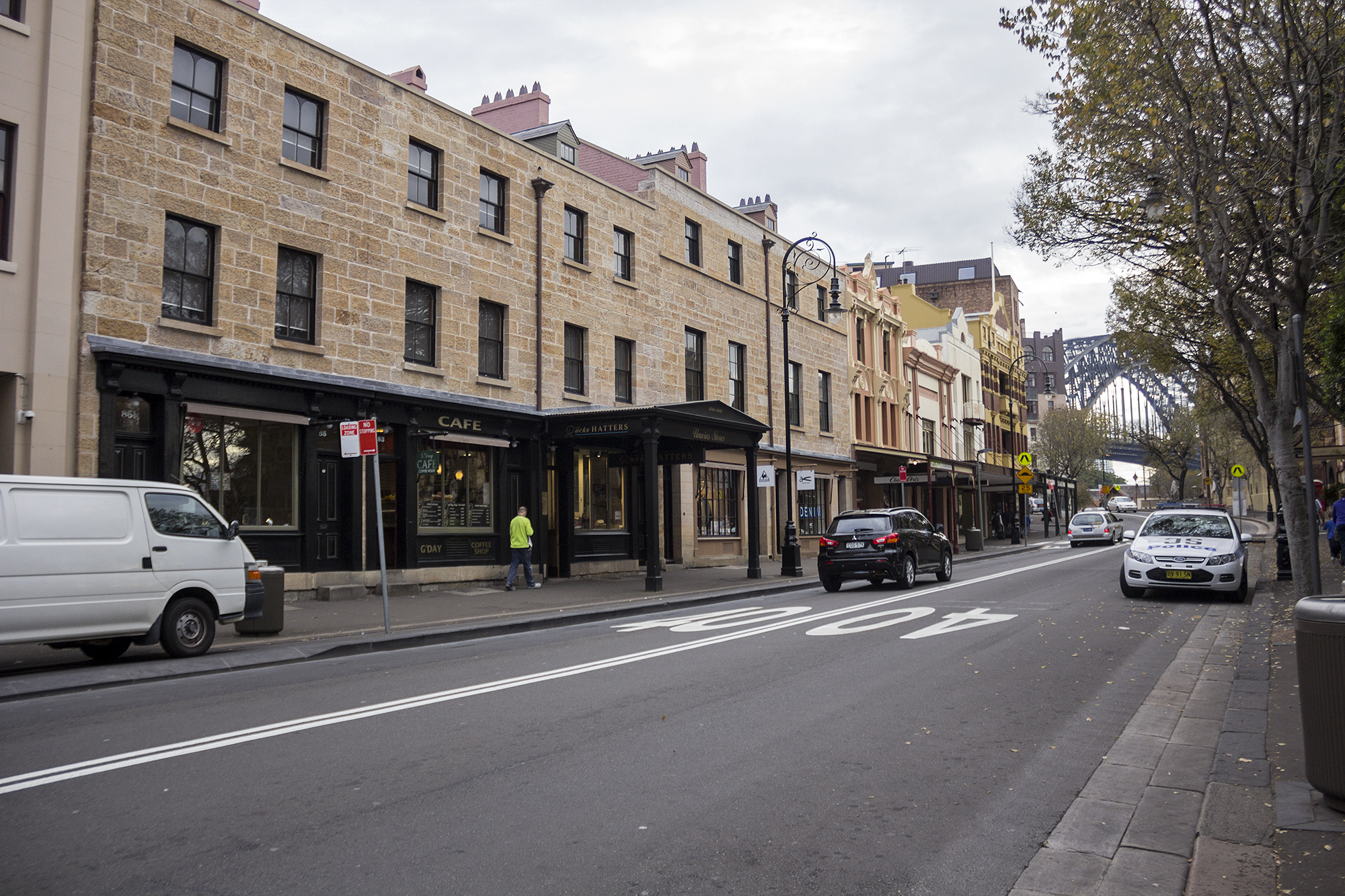
- Restored building housing the former Unwin's Stores, pictured in 2014

- Location within Sydney Location within Australia
- 33.8589°S 151.2087°E
- Location: 77–85 George Street, The Rocks, City of Sydney, New South Wales, Australia

History
- Built: 1843–1846

Site notes
- Architectural style: Colonial Georgian
- Owner: Property NSW

New South Wales Heritage Register
- Official name: Unwin's Stores; (Unwins)
- Type: State heritage (built)
- Designated: 10 May 2002
- Reference no.: 1613
- Type: Other - Retail & Wholesale
- Category: Retail and Wholesale
- Builders: Frederick Wright Unwin (built for)

The Unwin's Stores are heritage-listed shops and formerly a residence located at 77–85 George Street in the inner city Sydney suburb of The Rocks in the City of Sydney local government area of New South Wales, Australia. It was built from 1843 to 1846 for Frederick Wright Unwin. It is also known as Unwins. The property is owned by Property NSW, an agency of the Government of New South Wales. It was added to the New South Wales State Heritage Register on 10 May 2002.

== History ==
Frederic Wright Unwin constructed this building between 1843-46. Each tenement of three stories contained dwelling, kitchen and shop. The land on which Unwin's stores now stands was originally part of Sydney's first hospital and gardens. The site of 77 George Street was originally granted to William Carr and George John Rogers by Sir George Gipps in 1838. Land occupied by 79–85 George Street had been granted to John Piper in June 1828 by the Governor of the Colony.

Pre-1869 occupants were Raphael (clothier and outfitter), Nom Hing & Co. (merchants), Sun Kung Wor (merchants); 1869 – "Brecknock Arms" hotel; 1881 – 'Steam Packet Hotel'; 1889 – "Pacific Hotel". 79 George Street: 1855 – the 'American Hotel'; 1860 – doctors surgery, surgeons Frederick McKeller, Egan Myles, George Hamilton and William Shaw; 1879–98 – Tin War & Co., importers, managed by Tin War and Chin Fook. 81 George Street: 1857 – hairdressers and boarding house; 1867–74 – the "Steam Tug and Manly Beach Steamers" office; 1880 – 'Plimsoll Hotel'; 1887 – "Phoenix Hotel". 83 George Street: 1855 – Brockstein & Cohen, watchmakers, jewellers, opticians; 1871–82 – tenants included Mark Burge and Neil Quinn, bootmakers, and the pawnbroker, Duffey; 1887–95 – Post & Telegraph Office (C. L. Tucker, postmaster); 1895–1910 – restaurant managed by Mrs M. A. Dutton. 85 George Street: 1855 – Theodore Matthews, nautical instrument maker; 1861–76 – George Costin, hairdresser and tobacconist; 1876–1900 – tenants included an oilskin maker, outfitter, bootmaker, importers, Sun Yee Lee & Co. and Gee Ick, and restaurateurs F. P. Warner and Mrs E. Archdeacon.

The earliest Chinese tenants to lease one of the buildings of the Unwin's Stores were Chinese merchants, Nom, Hing & Co (1861–63); Nom, Woh & Co (1864–66) and Sun Kung Wor (1867–68) who all leased 81 George Street (equivalent to present day 77 George Street).

The next Chinese occupant was Tin War & Co. who leased 79 George Street from 1877 to 1897. In the Sands Directory, they are recorded as "Tin War & Co., merchants" (1877–82) and as "Tin War and Chin Fook, store keepers" (1883–97). The manager of Tin War & Co., Jasper Ung Quoy, was questioned at the Royal Commission into Chinese Gambling and Immorality. (Gambling Commission: 103ff.) A self-proclaimed respectable businessman, Ung Quoy, had been living in Australia up to 21 years and was the secretary of the Chinese society, Pow on Tong. He claimed to be against gambling and 15 years prior to the Commission's inquiry, he was elected by other respectable businessmen to investigate Chinese gambling in Sydney. However, Quong Tart's clansmen halted his investigations. When questioned about his business, Ung Quoy informed the Commission that Tin War & Co. were importers and acted as agents for the shipping firm E. And A. Company. Tin War & Co. also sold opium without a licence, even though it was illegal for Chinese to sell or import opium. Ung Quoy claimed that all the custom collectors and police knew about it and that Tin War only sold the item in bulk. When questioned whether Tin War & Co. conducted any gambling within its cellar, Ung Quoy responded: ' What do you ask me that for? I am as good as a European' and denied any gambling activity when asked again.

Other Chinese businesses also leased buildings of the Unwin's Stores while Tin War & Co. operated at 79 George Street for 20 years. Sun, Yee, Lee & Co. leased 85 George Street from 1882 to 1886, except in 1884 when they occupied 83 George Street and 85 George Street was leased to Yee Sung Loong & Co. for one year. Gee Ick & Co., importers, leased 85 George Street from 1888 to 1895 and also opened other branches in Wexford Street, Campbell Street and Hay Street.

From 1898 to 1905, there are no listed Chinese occupants in the Unwin's Stores. In 1906, 83 George Street was leased for two years to On War Jang, grocers, and in 1909 the same store was leased to Ping Fong & Co., grocers. In 1913, King Nam Jang, grocers, leased 85 George Street. King Nam Jang was started by Lo King Nam, who as a 16-year-old migrant arrived in NSW from South-east China in 1877. Under the name of Young Cumines, he was one of the earliest successful applicants for naturalisation in 1882, supported by his employers, the Cumines family. His adopted European surname is a family name still used by his descendants today. In the 1880s, Lo King Nam moved to The Rocks and established a providoring business and guesthouse. He raised seven children in The Rocks and at least one of his grandchildren was born in 85 George Street. Lo King Nam returned to China in 1921 and died there in 1939.

The well-known business created by Lo King Nam provided fresh food and supplies to ships that were trading between Australia and China. It was a business that involved the whole family and they became well known in the Rocks. Dolly Bonnette, a resident in The Rocks since the 1920s, remembers the proprietors as "Mr and Mrs King" and they were a store that served only to a Chinese clientele. She claimed to often visit the back of the store in Kendall Lane to play with their daughters and their sons would assist the customers.

Dolly also recalls that King Nam Jang provided temporary accommodation for "Anybody that had nowhere to go... or that they were drunk or anything... a shilling a bed for the night". She also mentions that at King Nam Jang, they housed newly arrived Chinese men (only men according to Dolly) until they could be sent further inlands to their relatives and usually to work in the market gardens. The men who stayed for a night or for a while longer would walk around the back to Kendall Lane in order to access their accommodation in the basement via ladders. Lydon describes the alterations as 'The basements were closed in and outbuildings were constructed in the rear yards to provide more space' Lydon suggests that the act of enclosing themselves and "manipulation of their environment" was response against white hostility that judged their lifestyle and customs and attempted to assimilate them into European society.

Workers of King Nam Jang also had occasional interaction with the Australian government. They were often used as interpreters by the Department of Immigration and during World War II; the NSW Government paid the Cumines family to house Chinese refugees from New Guinea at King Nam Jang. However, they were not always seen in a positive light. During World War I, King Nam Jang was suspected of harbouring deserters and stowaways. In 1924, Dick King, manager of King Nam Jang, was involved in a suspicious incident of custom officers rivalry. Senior Boarding Officer L.L. Clifford suspended Inspector Donohoe from duty because a packet of electrotype was apparently recovered from one of Donohoe's drawers. In Clifford's report to his superiors, he claimed that the packet read "Lam Kee Macao Opium" and that it was addressed to "King, Nam, Jang, 85 George Street, North". Clifford insinuated in his report that Donohoe and King were conspiring to smuggle opium into the country. However a recent translation of the Chinese Characters on the packet indicate that "opium" is not mentioned at all. King Nam Jang was in business for nearly 90 years when it first began in 1913. Lo King Nam's descendants are involved and well known within the Australian Chinese community. Henry Cumines, Lo King Nam's grandson, was born in 85 George Street in 1921 and would help out in the store. He went on to become a successful businessman and ran an export company in the Pacific Islands. Henry died in 2002.

Kong Chong, owner of a Chinese laundry, leased 81 George Street in 1917. The business was listed to the end of the Sand's Directory except in 1923 where Abraham Chernow, a second hand dealer, was listed as the occupant.

- Archaeological History 77–79 – Lease to William Balmain by 1800. Lease to William Gaudry, January 1810. Granted as Lot 2, Section 85 to William Carr and G. J. Rogers, solicitors, as trustees for James Shepherd, Richard Wood, Nathaniel Dermot, James Webber and Edmund Pontifex, assignees of estate of John Plummer and William Wilson, formerly Fenchurch Street, London, merchants and bankrupts.
- Archaeological History 81–85 – Grounds of original Sydney Hospital. Also included Surgeon's quarters nearby. Granted to John Piper as 184 rods on 4 June 1828.

== Description ==
Unwin's Stores comprise a row of sandstone commercial buildings, originally with residences over, fronting George Street. These five sandstone buildings, originally built as shops and dwellings, were erected by Frederic Wright Unwin between 1843 and 1846. They were constructed during a depression in the Colony's economy, in the decade prior to the discovery of gold. Thus, their architectural style reflects not only the prevailing style, Colonial Georgian, but also the relative austerity of the area during this period.

Style: Georgian; Storeys: Three plus basement; Facade: Sandstone; Roof Cladding: Corrugated iron (Coachhouse [south section]: slate roof); Shingles (originally); Floor Frame: Timber (hardwood).

Archaeology notes: Three storey sandstone warehouse and shops, 1844–1845. Part of the neighbouring warehouse, 1853–1854, on Kendall Lane. Vestiges of former buildings in courtyard, below level of Kendall Lane.; Built By: 1840s

=== Condition ===
As at 3 May 2001, Archaeology Assessment Condition: Partly disturbed. Assessment Basis: Basements under building on George Street. Level of courtyard below Kendall Lane, but surviving vestiges of former buildings. Although not a comprehensive archaeological excavation, the monitoring identified the site as having a high archaeological potential; particularly in the form of rubbish pits in the rear yards. Refurbishment works in the Coach House required a watching brief for ground disturbance. The Excavation Director was Damaris Bairstow. Simultaneously Carl Doring was commissioned to conduct an industrial archaeological study of the machinery still in situ. Investigation: Archaeological Excavation, Industrial Study.

Archaeology Assessment Condition: Partly disturbed. Assessment Basis: Basements under buildings on George Street. Investigation: Watching brief. Archaeology partly disturbed.

=== Modifications and dates ===
- No. 81: c. 1910.

== Heritage listing ==
As at 1 April 2011, the Unwin's Stores and site are of State heritage significance for their historical and scientific cultural values. The site and building are also of State heritage significance for their contribution to The Rocks area which is of State Heritage significance in its own right.

The row of buildings known as Unwin's Stores makes an important contribution to the outstandingly well-preserved group of nineteenth century shops which comprise the George Street North streetscape. They provide evidence of the city's maritime and business development on Sydney's main thoroughfare in the second and third quarters of the nineteenth century, and had a central location and role in this development. Their uses include a mixture of storage and the operation of a range of maritime businesses, residences, public houses and other small businesses characteristics of the area. The buildings illustrate the layout and nature of the early commercial area in terms of form, scale, materials and detailing. Despite modification, the buildings demonstrate the early subdivision in 1841 by Frederic Unwin, and the use of space demanded by urbanization. They demonstrate the scale and use of the city in the 19th century. A great deal of the original 1840s fabric survives and the surviving structures above and to a lesser extent, below ground offer physical evidence of more than a century and a half of use.

Unwin's Stores constitute a continuing resource for investigation and public interpretation, demonstrating the "realities of inner-city working class life in the 19th century". The buildings and associated garden walls demonstrate construction methods used in the 1840s. The site offers evidence which potentially contributes to a range of research themes, particularly the economic, political, social and physical development of the first urban settlement in Australia.

The Unwin's Stores should be considered of high local significance in regards to Chinese Australian heritage as it has had long-term Chinese occupation since 1861. The location of the stores, being situated within the vicinity of Circular Quay and The Rock's Chinatown, has made it to be considered by Chinese merchants as a prime position for conducting business. One of the businesses to occupy a building of the Unwin's Stores was Tin War & Co. from 1877 to 1897. Tin War's manager, Jasper Ung Quoy, was one of the witnesses called upon in the Royal Commission against Chinese Gambling and Immorality. Another well-known business was King Nam Jang, which was owned and run by the Cumines family, who at present day have up to five generations that has lived in Australia.

The buildings' associations with the first hospital and the Surgeon-General's Residence, with F W Unwin, with the Chinese community, with the early development of Sydney Cove and the development of Sydney's first commercial area are all significant. The continuity of small-scale commercial use up to the present day is significant.

Unwin's Stores was listed on the New South Wales State Heritage Register on 10 May 2002 having satisfied the following criteria.

The place is important in demonstrating the course, or pattern, of cultural or natural history in New South Wales.

This building is probably the longest continuously occupied row of shops in Australia. The yards portray the early subdivision in 1841 by F W Unwin. There is an important association with this very historic precinct of Sydney, in particular George Street, The Rocks.

The Unwin's Stores should be considered to be of high historical significance in regards to Australian Chinese heritage. This is due to the long-term Chinese occupation recorded for different buildings of the Unwin's Stores. The first Chinese tenants to lease one of the stores were in 1861. Its location near Circular Quay and The Rock's Chinatown made the Unwin's Stores a favourable position to conduct business to a Chinese clientele and ships docking in Sydney. While little is known about majority of the tenants, others such as Jasper Ung Quoy and the Cumines family are better known and documented.

The place has a strong or special association with a person, or group of persons, of importance of cultural or natural history of New South Wales's history.

The Unwin's Stores should be considered of high local significance in regards to Chinese Australian heritage as it has had long-term Chinese occupation since 1861. The location of the stores, being situated within the vicinity of Circular Quay and The Rock's Chinatown, has made it to be considered by Chinese merchants as a prime position for conducting business. One of the businesses to occupy a building of the Unwin's Stores was Tin War & Co. from 1877 to 1897. Tin War's manager, Jasper Ung Quoy, was one of the witnesses called upon in the Royal Commission against Chinese Gambling and Immorality. Another well-known business was King Nam Jang, which was owned and run by the Cumines family, who at present day have up to five generations that has lived in Australia.

The Unwin's Stores can be considered to have high historical association significance with Jasper Ung Quoy. Ung Quoy was the manager of Tin War & Chin Fook (79 George Street) and his testimony at the Royal Commission into Chinese Gambling and Immorality provides some insight into the Chinese - European relationship in Australia at the turn of the century. He was an advocate for the prohibition of gambling although when trying to fight it, he himself came across obstacles in his investigation. When questioned by the Royal Commission whether Tin War offered any gambling in its basements, his outburst about being "as good as a European" demonstrates that it was not enough for Chinese to be honest and hard-working but also necessary for them to be assimilated into European culture to be consider of high moral standing.

85 George Street also has high historical association significance with the Cumines family. Lo King Nam began leasing the building in 1913 and King Nam Jang became the home and birthplace for family members. Older residents of The Rocks recalled their business and their services as either an interpreter or guesthouse was employed by the government. The enclosed nature of their basement and the decision to cater only to a Chinese clientele further demonstrate the hostility felt by the Chinese migrants from the European community.

The place is important in demonstrating aesthetic characteristics and/or a high degree of creative or technical achievement in New South Wales.

The courtyards illustrate clearly the usage of the rear yards in connection with the early commercial buildings, i.e. the construction of cellars, fireplaces, stores, and covered ways. The treatment of the original and later fabric used in the construction, i.e. rough coursed stonework and stretcher bond brickwork. It conveys the typical spatial areas to the rear yards of the buildings in commercial precincts in terms of form, scale, materials and detailing.

The place has a strong or special association with a particular community or cultural group in New South Wales for social, cultural or spiritual reasons.

The association with Frederic W Unwin and precinct of Surgeon General's residence c. 1800. The association with the early development of Sydney Cove.

The Unwin's Stores are of high social significance to the Australian Chinese community. Its buildings represent a long-term occupation by Chinese migrants since 1861. The alternations of 85 George Street's rear yard remembered by Dolly Bonnette demonstrate the difficult process of social acceptance of the Chinese neighbour by the European community.

85 George Street hold high social significance for the Cumines Family and perhaps also to the Chinese migrants and World War II refugees who were housed at King Nam Jang temporarily.

The place has potential to yield information that will contribute to an understanding of the cultural or natural history of New South Wales.

The courtyards portray the early method of construction in stonework of cellars and boundary walls, and brickwork of stores, W.C. Later methods of alterations and additions are shown by building off the original walls, rather than rebuilding.

Jane Lydon conducted an archaeological investigation of the rear of the Unwin's Stores in 1991, however, the rear yards of 83 and 85 George Street were not a part of the excavation. From the 1991 excavation, only a small amount of Chinese objects were recovered from the phases of Chinese occupation. Any possible future construction in the rear yards of the Unwin's Stores, specifically 85 George Street has the potential to yield Chinese artefacts and to contribute to the current research on Chinese in the Rocks and NSW.

The Cumines Family, along with other member of the Australian Chinese community such as Allen Yip often do presentations on their predecessor's experience of early Sydney and Australia. With the assistance from these members of Australian Chinese community there is potential for further and more intimate research to be conducted on the Chinese migratory experience to the existing body of work. Recent publication on Chinese within Sydney include Shirley Fitzgerald's' Red Tape, Gold Scissors' and Jane Lydon's 'Many Inventions: The Chinese in The Rocks 1890-1930.'

The place possesses uncommon, rare or endangered aspects of the cultural or natural history of New South Wales.

The continual Chinese occupation of a building can be considered quite rare within Sydney, as witnessed in 85 George Street by King Nam Jang. Another site of continual Chinese occupation is 50 - 54 Dixon Street, Haymarket, which has been owned by Goon Yee Tong, Loon Yee Tong and Luen Fook Tong societies since 1917 and rooms of this building have been used as their clubrooms up to the present day.

The place is important in demonstrating the principal characteristics of a class of cultural or natural places/environments in New South Wales.

The Unwin's Stores can be considered to be representative of long-term occupation of a building or set of buildings for Chinese business.

== See also ==
- Australian residential architectural styles
- Raphael Mackeller Stores
