= Raphael Mackeller Stores =

Historic building in New South Wales, Australia

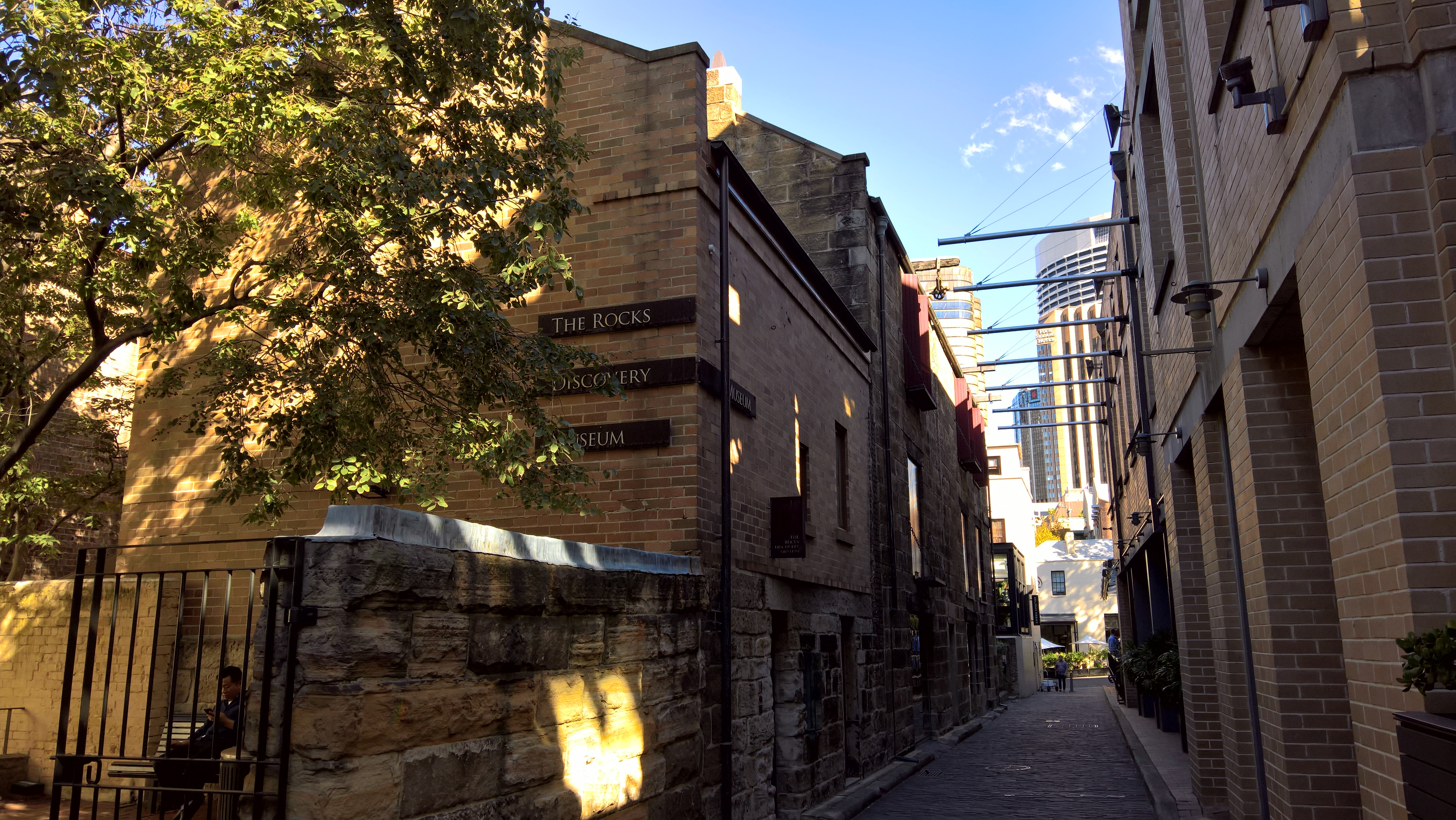
- Raphael Mackeller Stores, 4–6 Kendall Lane, The Rocks NSW. Foreground of building on left.

- Location within Sydney Location within Australia
- 33.8589°S 151.2087°E
- Location: 4–6 Kendall Lane, The Rocks, New South Wales, Australia

History
- Built: 1853–1854

Site notes
- Architectural style: Colonial
- Owner: Property NSW

New South Wales Heritage Register
- Official name: Coach House; The Rocks Toy Museum; Unwin's Coach House; The Coachhouse
- Type: state heritage (built)
- Designated: 10 May 2002
- Reference no.: 1539
- Type: Coach House/ Station
- Category: Transport - Land
- Builders: Built for Joseph George Raphael

The Raphael Mackeller Stores is a heritage-listed former store and now museum located at 4–6 Kendall Lane in the inner city Sydney suburb of The Rocks in the City of Sydney local government area of New South Wales, Australia. It was built from 1853 to 1854 for Joseph George Raphael. It is also known as The Rocks Toy Museum, Unwin's Coach House, Coach House, and The Coachhouse. The property is owned by Property NSW, an agency of the Government of New South Wales. It was added to the New South Wales State Heritage Register on 10 May 2002.

== History ==
The Raphael Mackeller Stores were reputedly erected as stores and possibly as stables and later used for small-scale manufacturing activities. Vacated in the 1980s the buildings were left disused for several years. The buildings still contain some machinery related to their former manufacturing and/or store functions. Although commonly known and referred to in the past as "The Coach House", the doorways and the lane access are barely adequate for manoeuvring a horse and cart or coach, making it unlikely that the building was ever used as a coach house.

The Raphael Mackeller Stores are two narrow stone buildings facing Kendall Lane. They were built along the rear boundary of the properties now called Nos. 77, 79 and 81 George Street North (earlier known as Nos. 81, 83 and 85 George Street respectively), being Unwin's Stores. The Raphael Mackeller Stores is generally considered as separate from the George Street properties it is purported to have originally served.

The subject land was originally granted to Captain John Piper in June 1828 by Lieutenant General Ralph Darling, Governor of the Colony. The allotment was part of the Sydney Hospital's stage 2 plan in the 1790s. When the land was not required for future extensions, William Balmain was granted a lease on the property and by 1807 he had surrendered the lease to the NSW Government. Frederick Wright Unwin gained title to the land in 1839, and his subdivision of 1841 included these properties.

Construction proper of the shops and houses fronting George Street commenced a few years earlier in 1843 by Unwin. No. 85 George Street was completed in November 1844 and No. 79 George Street was finished in the later half of 1845. Dr Frederick Mackellar purchased the four tenements in February 1853 for £2,100 and his trustees re-leased the buildings to the Crown and the then NSW Minister for Public Works in December 1902 for the sum of £5,932/15/4. The Mackeller Store located to the rear of 79-81 George Street was erected in 1853-4 by Dr Frederick Mackeller, physician and surgeon and owner of 79-81 George Street, as an extension of the original store building (Raphael Stores) built to the rear of 77 George Street.

The Raphael Store (at the rear of 77 George Street) was built in 1853 as store/warehouse. It was probably built for Joseph George Raphael, a merchant, publican, clothier, seaman's shipping agent, member of the NSW Parliament, and owner of 77 George Street. The building was constructed around the southern wall and chimney of Samson's Cottage (partially demolished). The present Samson's Cottage was rebuilt in 1991 to the same configuration. The close match in style and construction between the two sections (Raphael and Mackeller Stores) suggests a close cooperation between the owners and possibly the same builder.

For most of its history the Raphael Mackeller Stores were occupied by tenants of Unwin's Stores, including several Chinese businesses. In 1860 Nom, Hing & Co., Chinese merchants were the tenants. In 1864 Henry Murray, grocer was a part tenant followed by in 1865 Nom, Who & Co. and from 1866 to 1868 Chin Long was the storekeeper. The most recent tenant before the original conservation and adaptive reuse works in the late 1980s was Stanton Catchlove & Co who moved into 2 Kendall Lane in 1930 and manufactured sheep dip and soft soap. The company gradually took over 4 Kendall Lane from 1932 to 1936. They also ran a ship's chandlery from c. 1946. Stanton Catchlove moved out in 1986 and in 1990 was operating in Alexandria.

By May 2005, the Raphael Mackeller Stores was in use as the Rocks Toy Museum. This involved extensive conservation and adaptive reuse of the building to accommodate modern services and fitout occurring in 1988- 1990. In 2005, the Raphael Mackeller Stores were once again converted to accommodate the Rocks Discovery Museum (opened in December 2005), at which time, further conservation and interpretation works occurred.

== Description ==
The Raphael Mackeller Stores or Coach House is a narrow stone building facing Kendall Lane. It was built along the rear boundary of properties now called Nos. 77, 79 and 81 George Street North (earlier known, as Nos. 81, 83 and 85 George Street, respectively). The Coach House is now generally considered as separate from the George Street properties it originally served, and is now usually referred to as the Coach House or as Nos. 2 & 4 Kendall Lane. The justification for the "Coach House" name is fairly tenuous, but it seems to be the currently accepted name and so is used here as well.

The Coach House was reputedly erected as a store and stables over the period 1853–1854. It was later used for small-scale manufacturing activity, but was vacated in the 1980s and left disused. It still contains some machinery related to its former manufacturing and/or store functions. The doorways and the lane access are barely adequate for manoeuvring a horse and cart, let alone a coach, making it unlikely that the building was ever used as a coach house.

The three storey sandstone coach house was built in two stages. The first part on 77 George Street was built in 1853 and the second part on 79 George Street was built to the south in 1853–1854. This is visible from the continuous vertical joint that runs along the western and eastern facades of the building. The rough face sandstone block walls have six loading bays on the first and second floors, with three on the ground floor and one on Kendall Lane. The doors are framed and braced and all have hardwood lintels. Two cat head beams are at roof level to the north and middle doors projecting through above the loading bays. A pulley mechanism remains over the top level northern door. A corrugated iron gable roof has capped sandstone gable ends at the north and south ends of the building and over the continuous joint in the Kendall Lane Coachhouse at the boundary between Nos 77 and 79-81 George Street. The north wall is the original sandstone wall to the 1844 Samson's Cottage.

=== Industrial archaeology ===
==== Lineshafting and Associated Motor Drive ====
At ground floor level of No. 2 Kendall Lane, there is a short lineshaft mounted high on the east wall, near the ceiling. The shaft has a diameter of 38 millimetres (1.5 in) and is approximately 4 metres (13 ft) long. It is mounted in four plain sleeve metal (probably brass) bearings on four fabricated steel cantilever brackets attached to the east wall, with the axis of the shaft at approximately 540 millimetres (21 in) out from the wall, and approximately 2,400 millimetres (94 in) above the uneven floor.

The shaft has five pulleys for use with flat leather belts, but all of the belts have gone. Three of the pulleys are solid discs made of laminated wood, and the other two (larger) pulleys have laminated wood rims and wooden spokes. The pulleys are (from north to south end of the shaft):

(a) 710 millimetres (28 in) diameter (spoked) x 80 millimetres (3.1 in) face width; (b) 255 millimetres (10.0 in) diameter (spoked) x 80 millimetres (3.1 in) face width; (c) 190 millimetres (7.5 in) diameter (solid) x 160 millimetres (6.3 in) face width; (d) 200 millimetres (7.9 in) diameter (solid) x 150 millimetres (5.9 in) face width; (e) 180 millimetres (7.1 in) diameter (solid) x 115 millimetres (4.5 in) face width;

The largest pulley, (a), is at the northern end of the shaft, in line with the motor pulley, and was obviously used for the flat belt transferring mechanical power from the electric motor to the shaft. The smallest pulley,(e), is located at the southern end of the lineshaft, directly beneath a hole in the floor above, and was used for a belt transmitting power from the lineshaft to a small mixing machine at first (middle) floor level, used by Stanton Catchlove for making semi-liquid soap. The other three pulleys are located in between (a) and (e), and were used for flat belt drives to other machinery (since removed) at ground floor level, mainly mixing machines for making 44-imperial-gallon (0.00020 ML) much sheep dip and soft soap, again for Stanton Catchlove.

The shaft was probably installed in c. 1928 by Vita-Lick, or in c. 1930 by Stanton Catchlove, and was certainly used for many years by Catchlove. However, the pulleys look much older than 1930, and it is possible that the shaft was installed earlier, or that the pulleys were second-hand from some other site. The motor for driving the lineshaft was tucked beneath a wooden staircase at the northern end of the ground floor area, and is partly guarded (for operator safety) by a roughly made chain-wire mesh screen. The motor was a relatively modern "C & W' Type A, 3 phase AC, 3 horsepower (2.2 kW), variable speed, 550-1950 rpm, electric motor, made by Charles and Hunting, Melbourne. The motor ran at constant speed internally, but the output shaft speed is set at any speed between 550 rpm and 1950 rpm by varying the setting of internal intermediate conical drive pulleys. The internal conical drive setting, and hence output speed, is varied by means of a handwheel and flexible shaft connected to the motor easing. The pulley on the motor output shaft is cast-iron, 100 millimetres (3.9 in) diameter x 80 millimetres (3.1 in) face width, indicating that the lineshaft ran at a modest 80 to 280 rpm.

==== Mixer ====
At middle floor level in the north section of the Coach House (No. 2 Kendall Lane), there is a small mixing machine which was used by Stanton Catchlove & Co. for making semi-liquid soap. The machine has a cylindrical sheet-metal drum, about 350 millimetres (14 in) diameter x 560 millimetres (22 in) tall, with an open top and a lift-off thin pressed-metal lid, like a billy lid. The drum has a hemispherical bottom in which three concentric sets of circular mixing blades revolved, each set consisting of six semicircular rods spaced 60 degrees apart. The blades are on a short horizontal shaft connected by gears to an upper shaft which carries a pair of flat-belt pulleys. The upper shaft also acts as a pivot on which the drum could be tilted to discharge the contents.

Power was provided by a continuously running flat leather belt, which came up through a hole in the floor from the ground-floor lineshaft immediately beneath the mixer, and passed around the machine's pulleys. A handle with metal prongs enabled the mixer operator to slide the belt onto one pulley which was keyed to the gear shaft, and which then drove the mixing blades, or to slide the moving belt onto the second pulley which was not keyed but which rotated freely on the shaft and allowed the blades to stop. The combination of motor speed range, pulley sizes, and gearing ratio, gives the mixer blades a theoretical speed of 70 rpm to 250 rpm.

The mixer was probably installed by Catchlove on occupying the Coach House in c. 1930, but might have been in use earlier at their previous premises. The machine had no visible brand, but appeared to be a "mass" produced mixer rather than a one-off custom-made item. It resembles a food mixer, and it is likely that the blades could be removed for cleaning. The drum appears to be made of tin-plated or galvanised sheet steel, with some of the galvanizing or plating flaking off. More sturdy brackets, pivots etc., are riveted to the outside of the drum at strategic locations. The drum still contains a residue of (presumably) soap. The whole mixer is very dirty, but in fairly intact condition, except that the drive belt is missing, and a drain cock has been removed from a threaded outlet at the bottom of the drum.

==== Winch and Catshead Pulley ====
A large manually-powered winch is bolted to the top floor of the north section of the Coach House (No. 2 Kendall Lane), just inside and facing the top loading doorway over Kendall Lane. The winch has a fairly modern steel wire cable wrapped around the winching drum. The free end of the cable passes out through a small hole above the loading doors, passes over a pulley attached to the external catshead beam protruding above the doorway, and ends with a hook.

The winch and hook were obviously intended for hoisting heavy loads from the laneway up to the middle or upper floor levels, or for lowering loads to the laneway. The load rating of the winch, cable and catshead beam, is not visible, although a safe load rating is normally required to be clearly displayed next to any lifting device. Such a notice may have been removed, but possibly the winch was never inspected after the relevant regulations came into force.

The winch has a pair of A-shaped cast-iron side frames, marked with the name of the manufacturer, "BROWN LENOX & Co, LONDON". The frames are joined by three horizontal tie rods with threaded ends, which pass through holes at the apex and at each foot of the A-frame, and are secured by square nuts. Also mounted horizontally between the pair of A-frames are the cast-iron winch drum (near the centre of the frame), a winding handle shaft, and an intermediate gear shaft (both near the apex of the frame, which is at about waist height).

At one end of the winch drum there is a large 64 or 65 tooth gear wheel. Above that is a much smaller 10 tooth pinion gear on the winding handle shaft, which has a large crank handle at each end, enabling the pinion gear to be turned by two men. Normally, the small pinion gear would be engaged directly with the large drum gear, and about 6.5 turns of the handles would be required to get one turn of the winch drum.

Next to the handle shaft is another shaft with a set of 24 tooth and 10 tooth intermediate gears, which are normally disengaged and sitting idle, but which, by a simple arrangement, can be slid across to be interposed as a second reduction stage between the handle pinion gear and the main drum gear. This gives extra gear reduction, so that about 15.5 turns of the handles are needed for one turn of the drum. Engaging the intermediate gears allows much heavier loads to be lifted occasionally, although they would be raised more slowly, a versatile arrangement well suited to a small store like this one.

On the side of the main drum gear there is a narrow brake drum, around which is wrapped a brake band. The upper end of the brake band is attached to a fixed pin in the top of one leg of the A-frame side casting. The lower end of the band is connected to a long lever, allowing the operator to apply considerable tension to the brake band, and thus control the lowering of the load. If preferred, one or both winding handles could be removed to stop them spinning during lowering of the load. The nuts or threaded knobs which were used to secure the handles to the shaft have been lost, but the handles are still in place.

At the opposite end of the drum there is a toothed ratchet which originally had a pawl to engage it, to lock the drum and the load in a fixed position. The engaging pawl has gone, and several teeth of the ratchet are broken, indicating that there were problems with the pawl breaking or not engaging properly, and the load getting away.

The floor beneath the winch is strengthened locally by two cross-planks, held by the same bolts which secure the feet of the winch to the floor joists. Above the winch there is a makeshift wire tie from the winch to the overhead roof truss. the purpose of the tie is unclear, but possibly it was intended to prevent the floor shaking during hoisting, or possibly there was some concern that the winch might fall through the floor.

The date of installation of this winch has not been determined, but winches of a very similar type can be seen in a c. 1887 photograph of railway construction work, and in a c. 1898 photograph of a water reservoir being built. It is quite likely that this Coach House winch is of about the same vintage, i.e. about 100 years old. It has been in the same location since first installed in the building. The date of its installation is not known. It may have been installed new in the 1880s or 1890s, but equally may have been moved in from another location by a later tenant.

=== Summary of the building fabric ===
Style: Colonial; Storeys: Three; Facade: Sandstone; Roof: Slate on timber truss; Floor: Stone flagging on ground floor, timber boarding on timber framing first and second.

=== Condition ===
As at 25 May 2006, major conservation works c. 1988-90. No major excavations, only service trenches through Unwin's Courtyards through existing trenches. Conservation and adaptive works were carried out in 2005 to convert the building into The Rocks Discovery Museum. the archaeology is partly disturbed.

=== Modifications and dates ===
- c. 1988–90 – Some sandstone replacement, New shop fronts to ground floor and doors sets to upper warehouse openings. Extensive repairs. New roofing and upper floor ceiling lining. Floors reinforced with steel beams.
- 2005 – Conservation and adaptive works carried out to convert the building into The Rocks Discovery Museum.

== Heritage listing ==
As at 29 January 2009, the Raphael Mackeller Stores are a rare surviving example of stores with workshops for light industry above located in Sydney and dating from the 1850s period. It has state historical significance for the industrial usage associated with The Rocks as an inner city commercial precinct of Sydney with the light manufacturing usages continuing in the mid-1980s. As part of the Kendall Lane/Unwin Stores Precinct and The Rocks as a whole it conveys very clearly the character of Sydney's mid to late 19th century period of development. The exterior and interiors of the building are of state aesthetic significance and the buildings hold research potential in retaining many original or later finishes and fixtures which interpret its industrial nature. The late nineteenth century catshead beams and pulley are rare surviving examples in their original location. The Raphael Mackeller Stores and site are of state heritage significance for their historical and scientific cultural values. The site and building are also of state heritage significance for their contribution to The Rocks area which is of state heritage significance in its own right.

The Raphael Mackeller Stores or Coach House was listed on the New South Wales State Heritage Register on 10 May 2002 having satisfied the following criteria.

The place is important in demonstrating the course, or pattern, of cultural or natural history in New South Wales.

The Raphael Mackeller Stores has historic value because of its immediate visual association with an early phase of Sydney's history. The coach house is associated with a very historic precinct of Sydney, George Street, The Rocks, indicating early commercial activity.

The place has a strong or special association with a person, or group of persons, of importance of cultural or natural history of New South Wales's history.

The Raphael Mackeller Stores is associated with the merchants and professionals Frederick Mackellar (solicitor, father of long-term parliamentarian Sir Charles Mackellar and grandfather of poet Dorothea Mackellar), Joseph George Raphael (merchant, seaman shipping agent, clothier, publican and member of NSW parliament) and Frederic Wright Unwin, who were all instrumental in the early development of the commercial precinct of George Street North and Kendall Lane.

The place is important in demonstrating aesthetic characteristics and/or a high degree of creative or technical achievement in New South Wales.

The Raphael Mackeller Stores is a well detailed colonial sandstone three storey building which is relatively intact and has had sympathetic restoration works carried out. It is an extremely significant townscape element to Kendall Lane portraying the original form, scale, detail and material of the 1850s. The internal layout has been largely untouched and hence portrays the full character of the building.

The place has a strong or special association with a particular community or cultural group in New South Wales for social, cultural or spiritual reasons.

The Raphael Mackeller Stores have social significance as an important feature in The Rocks Conservation Area, and contributes strongly to the character of The Rocks. The Raphael Mackeller Stores are held in high esteem as indicated by their listings on the State Heritage Register, the National Trust register and the now defunct Register of the National Estate, and thus is recognised by an identifiable group/s and has importance to the broader community.

The place has potential to yield information that will contribute to an understanding of the cultural or natural history of New South Wales.

The construction of the Raphael Mackeller Stores indicates the early method of building and finishing in the 1850s, using hardwood flooring, beams, columns and sandstone block walls. The common wall between the south and north parts also indicates the practice of using adjacent boundary walls where possible.

The Lineshaft: The lineshaft and pulleys are typical of small-scale factories c.1900 to 1940, when electric motors were too expensive to be fitted to each individually driven machine. The arrangement with all wooden pulleys and combination of both spoked and solid wooden pulleys is fairly unusual. Although this lineshaft is not an outstanding example, it has some significance as representing a technology which was very important and is now rare. The main significance of the lineshafting is its indication that small-scale manufacturing activity was carried on in this building for more than 50 years.

Soap Mixer: The mixer is not an outstanding artefact, but has a local significance as a specific reminder of one aspect of the manufacturing activities carried on in this building for more than 50 years. The mixer complements the lineshaft, being the only remaining example of the machinery previously driven by the lineshaft.

Winch & Catshead Pulley: The winch and associated catshead pulley are very significant, because they represent the original and long-standing function of the Raphael Mackeller Stores as a typical small multi-storey store warranting manual-powered hoist machinery, but not warranting a major steam or hydraulically powered hoist. As such the winch and pulley are also representative of the once numerous but now rare winches of a similar type which must have operated in many other small multi-storey stores and warehouses in The Rocks and throughout the Sydney commercial and shipping district during the late 19th and early 20th century. The winches helped make the use of such stores viable. This winch is also significant for being in its working location, and in nearly complete working condition. The pulley has not been dated, but the winch is approximately 100 years old, and should certainly be considered an industrial relic.

The place possesses uncommon, rare or endangered aspects of the cultural or natural history of New South Wales.

The Raphael Mackeller Stores is not uncommon or rare.

The place is important in demonstrating the principal characteristics of a class of cultural or natural places/environments in New South Wales.

The Raphael Mackeller Stores is representative of early commercial stores constructed within the first century of European settlement in Sydney Cove. Together with the Union Bond Store and Argyle Stores located along George Street, Evans' Stores, Harrington Street and Campbell's Stores, Circular Quay West (amongst others), all built in a similar period (mid to late 1800s); the Raphael Mackeller Stores contribute to the history of The Rocks Precinct, the areas' early history of maritime based commerce and is representative of the developing economy of the young colony.

== See also ==
- Australian non-residential architectural styles
