= Mary Ann Piper =

Colonial Australian figure (1789–1872)

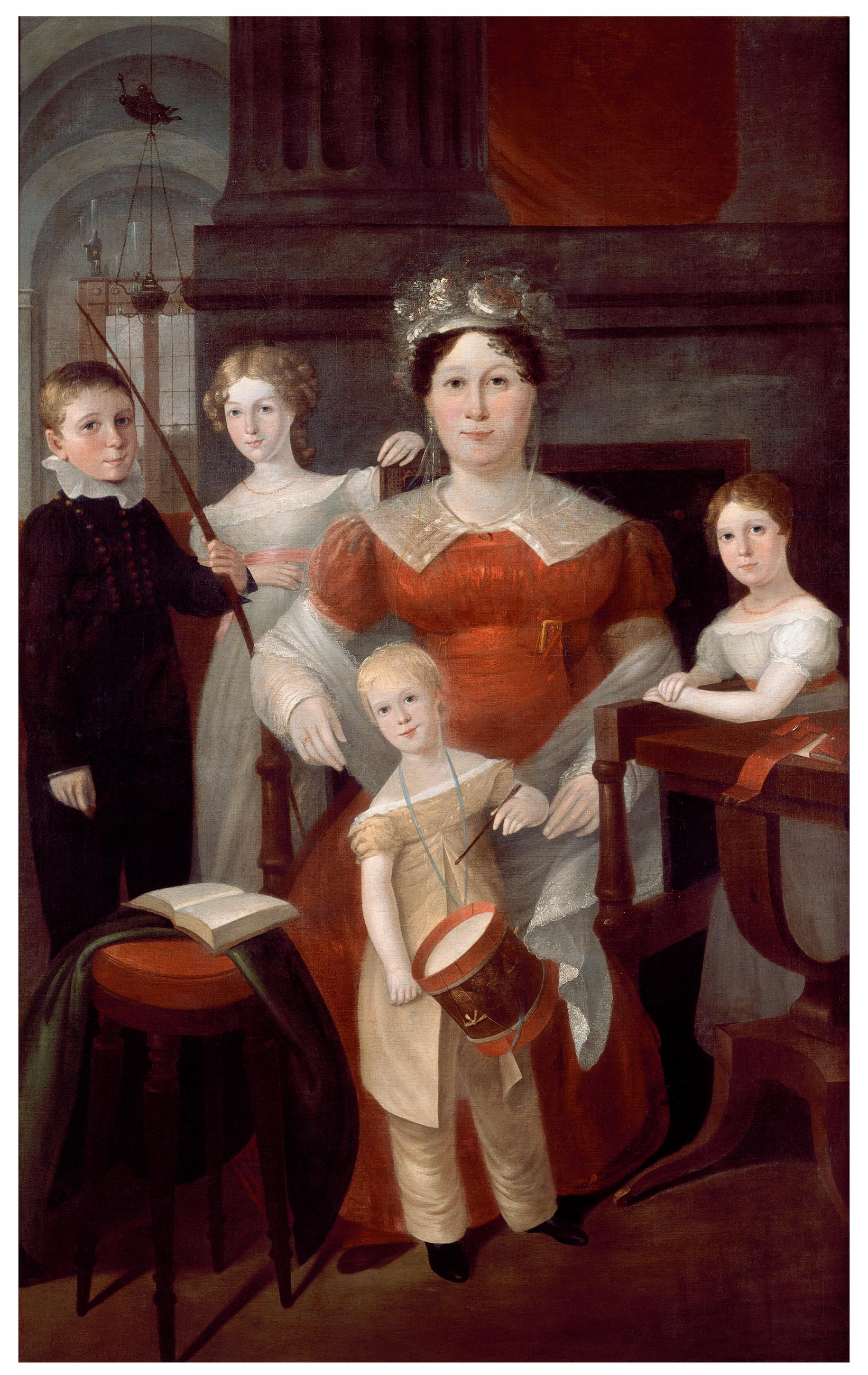
- Portrait by Augustus Earle, c. 1826
- Born: Mary Ann Sheers; 4 August 1789
- Died: 1872 (aged 82–83); Bathurst, New South Wales
- Spouse: John Piper
- Children: 15 (including John, Hugh, and Elizabeth)
- Parent(s): James Sheers and Mary Smith

Mary Ann Piper (née Sheers; 4 August 1789 – 1872) was a figure in colonial New South Wales. The daughter of First Fleet convicts, she eventually married the military officer John Piper and entered the colony's elite.

== Early life and family ==
Mary Ann Sheers was born on 4 August 1789. Her parents were both convicts who arrived with the First Fleet in 1788: James Sheers, transported on the Scarborough, and Mary Smith.

In 1790, the family moved to Norfolk Island. She eventually met John Piper, then acting Commandant of the island. They began a relationship on the island, where their first children were born.

== Marriage and social life ==
In 1811, she accompanied Piper to England, returning to Sydney in 1814. On 10 February 1816, they were married by special license.

The family moved into Henrietta Villa at Point Piper in 1822. As the "Mistress of Point Piper," Mary Ann became a central figure in Sydney society, hosting extravagant gatherings for the colony's elite.

== Later life in Bathurst ==
Following Piper's financial collapse in 1827, the family relocated to the Bathurst plains. Mary Ann lived in Bathurst after her husband's death in 1851. She died at Westbourne in 1872 at the age of 83. Mary Ann was the subject of the 1826 oil painting Ann Piper and her children by Augustus Earle.
