= John Piper (British Army officer) =

English militra officer

Captain John Piper
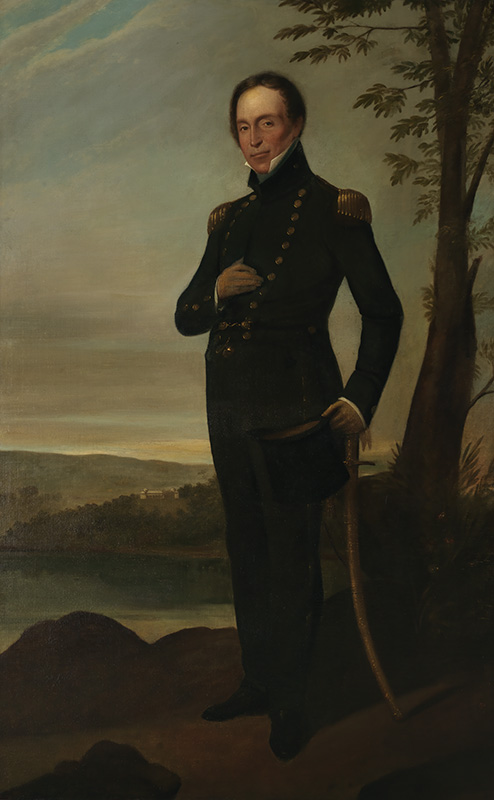
- Portrait by Augustus Earle, c. 1826
- Born: 20 April 1773; Maybole, Ayrshire Scotland
- Died: 8 June 1851 (aged 78) near Bathurst, New South Wales, Australia
- Spouse: Mary Ann Shears
- Children: 14
- Military career
- Allegiance: United Kingdom/Australia
- Branch: New South Wales Corps
- Service years: April 1791–1811 (20 years)
- Rank: Captain
- Commands: Lieutenant-Governor of Norfolk Island; New South Wales Collection of Customs Duties
- Other work: Bank of New South Wales (Chairman); Australian Agricultural Co.; Scot's Church, Sydney

John Piper (20 April 1773 – 8 June 1851) was a military officer, public servant and landowner in the colony of New South Wales. The Sydney suburb of Point Piper was named in his honour.

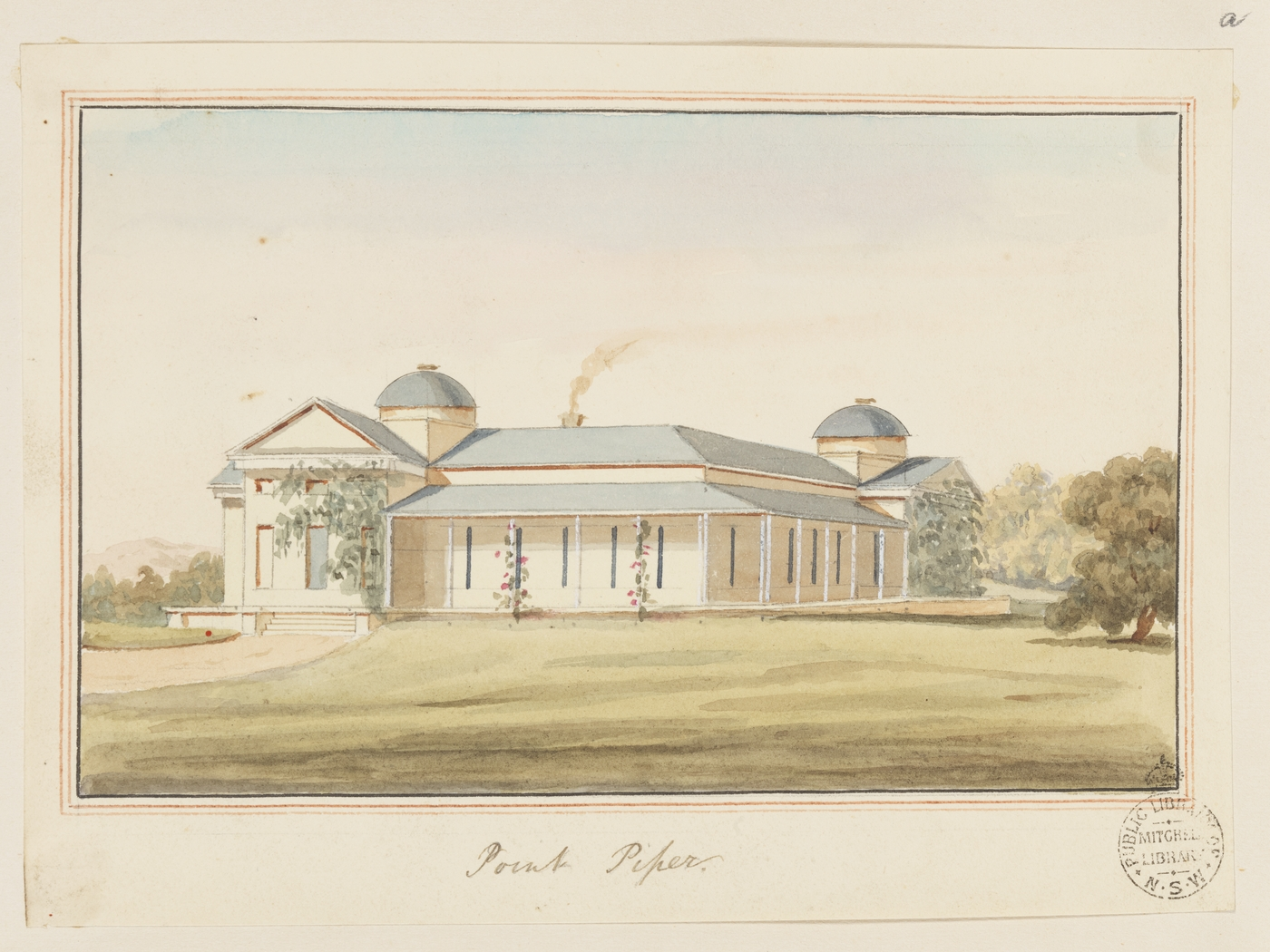
Point Piper House (Henrietta Villa), 1840s

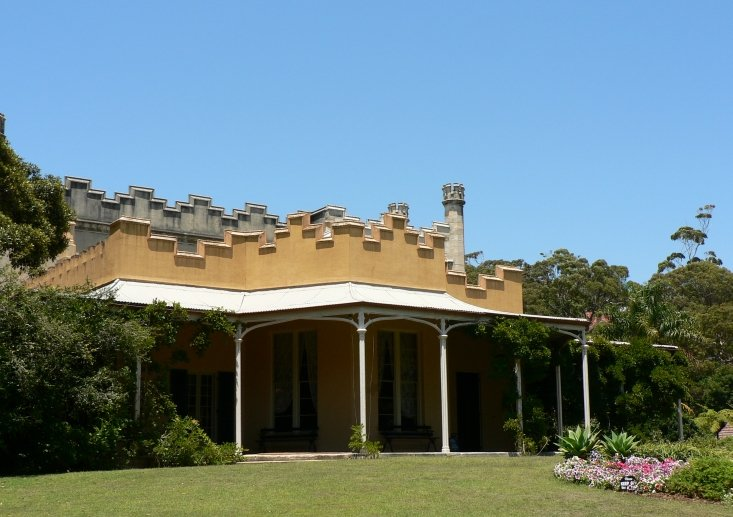
Vaucluse House, one of Piper's properties in Sydney

== Background ==
Piper was born in Maybole, Ayrshire Scotland, son of Hugh Piper, a local physician; his family came from Cornwall.

== Military career ==
He was commissioned as an ensign in the New South Wales Corps in 1791, and sailed on the convict ship Pitt, arriving in Sydney in February 1792. In 1793 he was sent, at his own request, to the convict settlement of Norfolk Island, perhaps because of a scandalous love affair. There was certainly an illegitimate daughter born around this time.

Piper was promoted lieutenant and returned to Sydney in 1795; from 1797 to 1799 he was on leave. In 1800 Piper was promoted to the local rank of captain. Piper supported John Macarthur in the struggle between the New South Wales Corps and Governor King, and acted as his second in a duel with Colonel Paterson, his commanding officer. Piper was arrested and court-martialled in 1802, but apologised and was acquitted, to King's disgust.

Piper returned to Norfolk Island in 1804 and, when Lieutenant-Governor Joseph Foveaux left on prolonged sick leave, became acting commandant. His rule was mild, one of the convicts later writing that he "had the good will and respect of everyone, for he had always conducted himself as a Christian and a gentleman." He was promoted to the full rank of captain in 1806. During Piper's period of leadership on Norfolk Island the British government decided it was too costly to maintain, and planned to close the settlement and transfer the inhabitants to Sydney or Van Diemen's Land. Piper showed both tact and organising ability in arranging for the transfers, especially of those settlers who had built up farms and families on the island.

Piper returned to Sydney in 1810, having avoided all the turmoil of the Rum Rebellion. He sailed for England in 1811, but resigned his commission and returned to Sydney in February 1814, as Naval Officer.

== Administrative career ==
In 1816 he married Mary Ann Shears, the daughter of two First Fleet convicts, who had already borne several children by him.

As Naval Officer, Piper was responsible for the collection of customs duties, excise on spirits, harbour dues, control of lighthouses, and crime on water. This post proved very remunerative, and he was able to purchase the property now known as Vaucluse House. He was granted 77 hectares (190 acres) on what is now Point Piper and built Henrietta Villa (also called the Naval Pavilion) at the large cost of £10,000. He was appointed a magistrate by Governor Macquarie in 1819, was chairman of directors of the Bank of New South Wales, sat on the local committee of the Australian Agricultural Co., was president of the Scots Church committee, and was involved in many social and sporting activities. As well as Point Piper he had 192 hectares (475 acres) at Vaucluse, 460 hectares (1,130 acres) at Woollahra and Rose Bay, a farm of 119 hectares (295 acres) at Petersham, 280 hectares (700 acres) at Neutral Bay, 32 hectares (80 acres) at Botany Bay, 810 hectares (2,000 acres) at Bathurst, 120 hectares (300 acres) in Van Diemen's Land, and a zero point four zero hectares (one acre) of commercial land in George Street, Sydney.

Piper however, had financial difficulties; in 1826 he raised a mortgage of £20,000. He was forced to resign his bank chairmanship after an enquiry into its affairs in January 1827, and that April was suspended from his position as Naval Officer when mismanagement of customs collection was discovered.

Subsequently, Piper unsuccessfully tried to drown himself one evening after ordering his boat crew to sail his barge five miles from land beyond Sydney's North Head with the pretense of assessing the requirements for building a lighthouse on North Head. On the return with a steady breeze and the sails hoisted he leapt out at the stern and disappeared. It took his crew some time to pull down the sails and turn the boat to row back to where their master was sinking. With a struggle they saved him in time and succeeded in bringing him safely home. In later days he thanked divine providence for his rescue and was desirous of amending his life.

Piper was forced to sell most of his property to repay his debts in full. He then moved to his farm "Alloway Bank", at Bathurst and became an important person in the town with visits by Governor Darling and later Governor Bourke. He was chairman of the committee which raised the funds to build St Stephens Presbyterian church. Piper was forced to mortgage the property in the drought of 1838 to 1841, and the subsequent economic depression of 1844 forced the Pipers to leave the property. Piper was saved by his friends who re-established the family to a property of 500 acres, called Westbourne, beside the Macquarie River at Bathurst. Here Piper died on 8 June 1851, and Mary Ann continued to live until her death twenty years later, supported by her numerous children.

Marjorie Barnard claims that "John Piper was a man of his times. He personified the colonial dream." He was an officer during the military rule, a civil servant when New South Wales became a civil state, and a land pioneer during the pastoral age. "He was honourable, generous, and so well loved that he was forgiven things which would have wrecked a stronger man. … He was a master of the bright illusion."
