= William Pitt (ship) =

Several vessels have been named William Pitt for William Pitt, 1st Earl of Chatham (1708–1778), a.k.a. William Pitt the Elder, British prime minister (1766–1768) or William Pitt the Younger (1759–1806), son of the above and British prime minister (1783–1801, 1804–1806).

Three have sailed for the British East India Company (EIC):

- William Pitt (1785 EIC ship) was launched on the River Thames in 1785 as an East Indiaman. She made six voyages for the British East India Company (EIC). During her fourth she served as an ad hoc warship in a naval campaign during which she saw action. Thereafter she served as a transport, including one voyage in 1801-1802 transporting rice from Bengal to Britain. She was sold for breaking up in 1809.
- William Pitt (1803 ship) was built in Liverpool. She made three complete voyages for the EIC, and on the first of these she transported convicts to New South Wales. She was lost in a gale to the east of Algoa Bay in December 1813 while homeward bound from her fourth voyage.
- William Pitt (1805 EIC ship) was launched on the Thames. She made seven voyages for the EIC between 1805 and 1819. In 1810 and 1811 she participated as a transport in two British military campaigns. She was sold for breaking up in 1820.

Other vessels:

- The hired armed lugger William Pitt, of twelve 4-pounder guns and 10777/94 tons (bm), served the British Royal Navy under contract from 11 August 1796. Six Spanish gunvessels captured her off Gibraltar on 6 June 1799.
