= Old Ambulance Station, The Rocks =

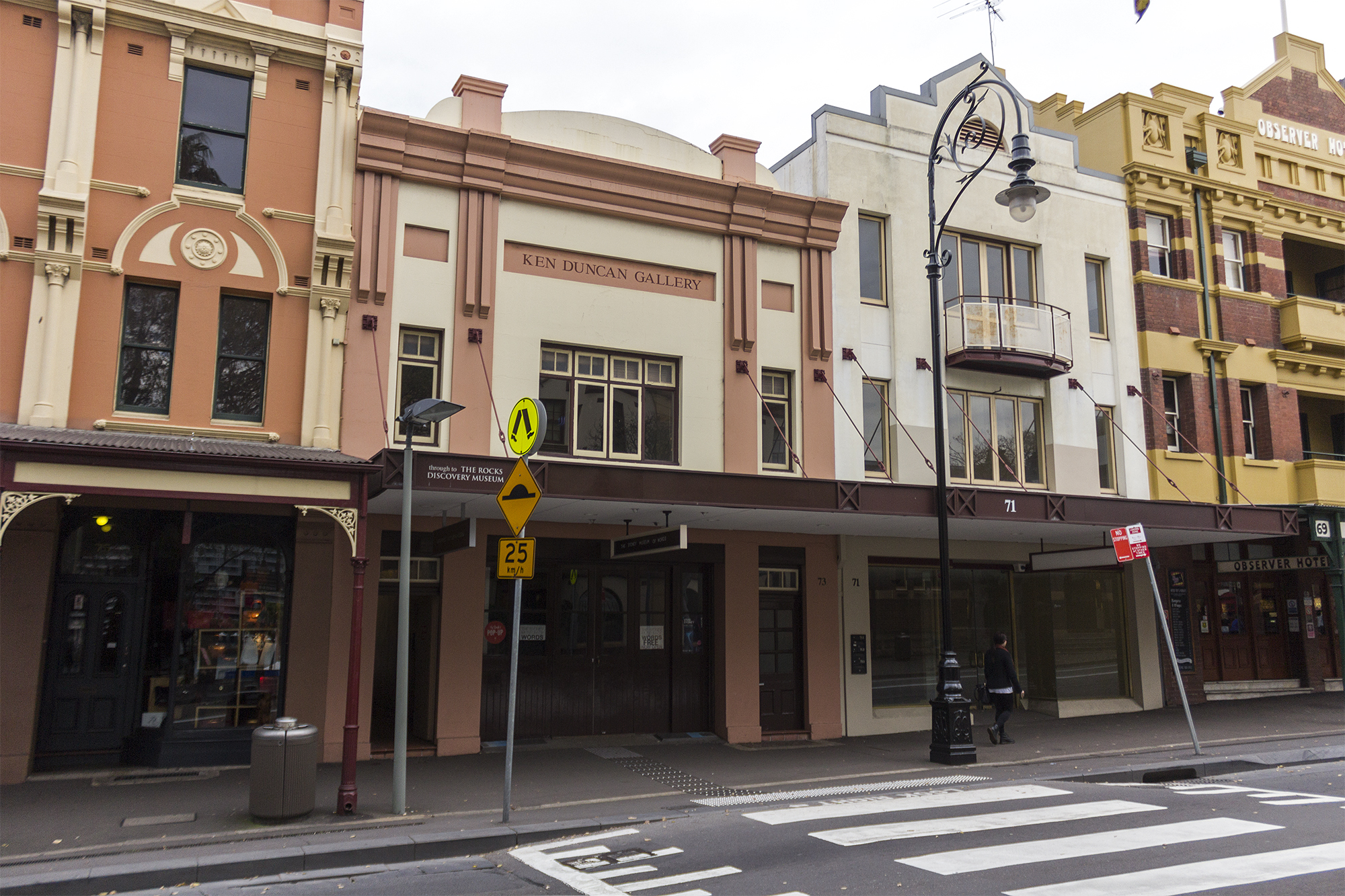
- The former ambulance station and now Ken Duncan Gallery, pictured in 2014

- Location within Sydney Location within Australia
- 33.8585°S 151.2088°E
- Location: 73 George Street, The Rocks, City of Sydney, New South Wales, Australia

History
- Built: 1842–1843

Site notes
- Architect(s): Howie Moffot & Co (1927-8 front facade)
- Architectural style: Victorian Georgian
- Owner: Property NSW

New South Wales Heritage Register
- Official name: Shop, Ken Duncan Gallery; Ambulance Station
- Type: State heritage (built)
- Designated: 10 May 2002
- Reference no.: 1589
- Type: Ambulance Station
- Category: Health Services

The Old Ambulance Station, The Rocks is a heritage-listed former ambulance station and public house and now the headquarters of The Argyle Network, a technology recruitment business located at 73 George Street in the inner city Sydney suburb of The Rocks in the City of Sydney local government area of New South Wales, Australia. It was built from 1842 to 1843 and the front facade was designed in 1927–8 by Howie Moffot & Co. It is also known as the Former Central District Ambulance Station and Ken Duncan Gallery. The property is owned by Property NSW, an agency of the Government of New South Wales. It was added to the New South Wales State Heritage Register on 10 May 2002.

== History ==
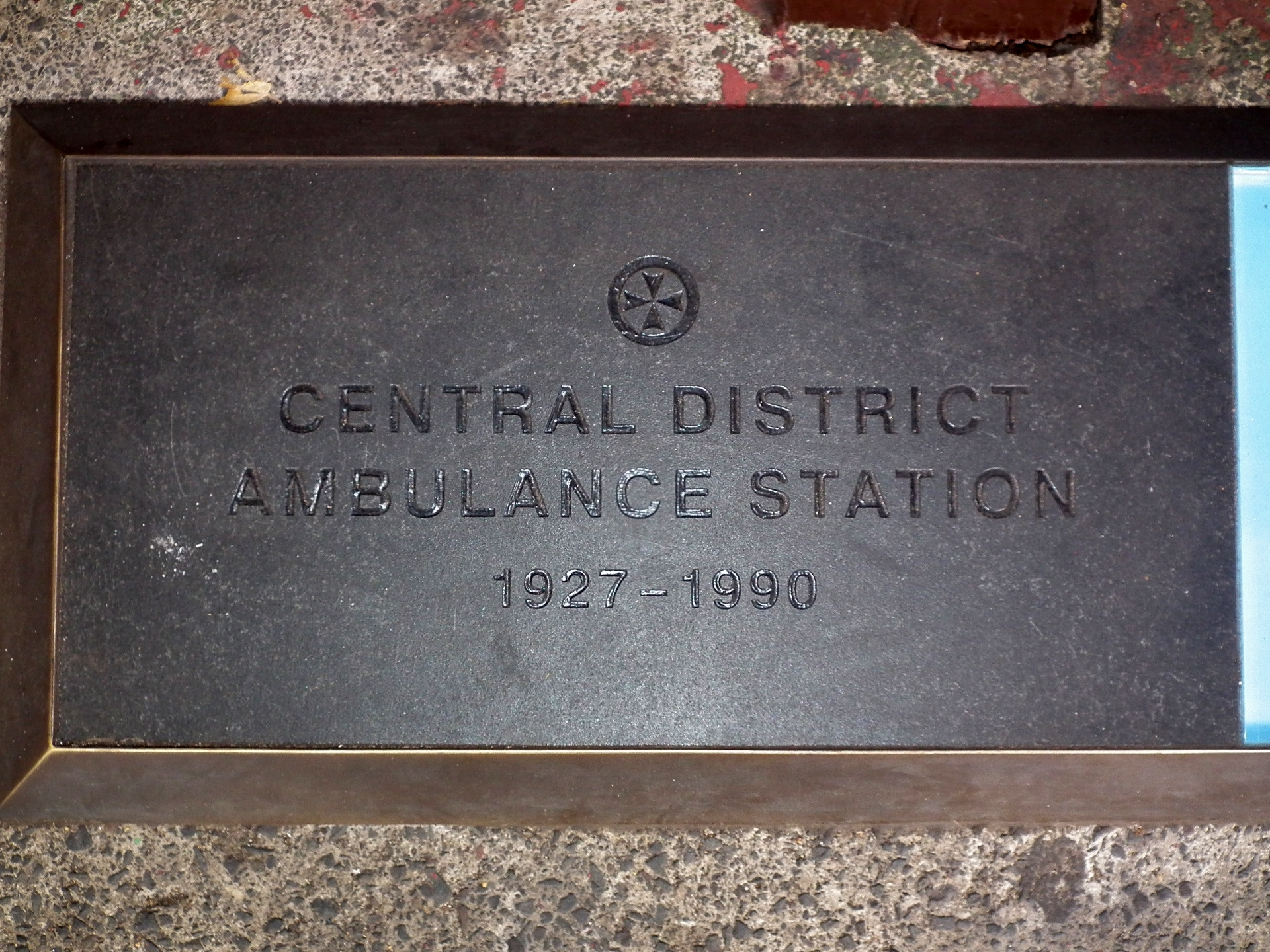
A plaque to mark the site as the location of the Central District Ambulance Station from 1927 to 1990.

The site was a part of the first hospital site. Lot 2 of Sydney City Section 85 was originally granted to William Carr and George John Rogers by Crown grant in October 1838. In February 1839, Frederic Wright Unwin became one of the owners of the Carr & Williams grant and on 26 February 1842 Unwin conveyed to Matthias Hooper lot 8 of Unwin's subdivision.

Hooper erected a public house on lot 8 in 1842–1843 which was called the "Kings Head". The three-storey building containing ten rooms was constructed with brick walls and a slated roof. The public house was described as having "every convenience". The building was 25 feet wide by 40 feet deep. Hooper was the publican of the "Kings Head" until he conveyed the property to William Carss in December 1849. Carss employed Edward Hancock to manage the public house during 1850. In March 1853, W. Carss and his wife conveyed the "Kings Head" to William Anthony Wright. Wright leased the hotel to George F Ewen, publican, who managed the inn from 1854 to 1859. During 1855 Wright erected stores to the rear of the lot, along the southern boundary against Mrs. Samson's Cottage. On 21 January 1856 W. A. Wright conveyed the public house to Thomas Goudie a confectioner of Sydney. During 1860-61 James Goudie managed the inn which was still known as the "Kings Head".

In September 1870, Goudie conveyed the property to Andrew Henry Julius Baass, accountant, who in the same month sold the property to Joseph George Raphael, merchant. Raphael changed the hotel's name to the "Great Pacific Hotel" in 1874 and in c. 1870 the stone perimeter walls were erected to the north and west boundaries of the allotment. In 1885, the hotel's name was changed again to the "P & O Hotel" by the new licensee Mrs. Mary A. Ferguson who remained until 1891. In December 1900 the property was resumed by the NSW Government. The P&O; Hotel operated until at least 1909. The Salvation Army, Naval and Military Home was established in 1911 and remained the tenants until 1927 when the building was renovated.

In March 1927 Howie Moffot & Co. submitted plans for alterations to the building and in 1928, after the completion of the facade and internal works, the Circular Quay Depot of the Central District Ambulance Service began operations.

In 1950 the Housing Commission was responsible for the leasing of the property, rent was charged at £5 per annum.

In 1971 the upstairs rooms were rewired, painted and refurnished to provide school and demonstration facilities for Introductory Training Classes for recruits for the Central District. At the end of 1973 classes ceased when responsibility for training was transferred to the NSW Ambulance Board. In the mid-1980s there was a proposal to establish an Ambulance Service Museum on the premises and for a time several old Ambulances were on display.

By late 1990 the premises were found to be infested with white ants and the floor boards, particularly on the first floor were unsound and creating an occupational and safety issue. The premises were vacated on 9 November 1990 and the lease relinquished to the Sydney Cove Redevelopment Authority.

From 2008 to 2018 the Ken Duncan Gallery occupied the premises, after which, it became the headquarters of The Argyle Network, an Australian Technology recruitment business.

=== Archaeology notes ===
- Lease to William Balmain, by 1800.
- Lease to William Gaudry, January 1810.
- Granted as Lot 2, Section 85 to William Carr and G. J. Rogers, solicitors, as trustees for James Shepherd, Richard Wood, Nathaniel Dermot, James Webber and Edmund Pontifex, assignees of estate of John Plummer and William Wilson, formerly Fenchurch Street, London, merchants and bankrupts.
- Current building built 1840s.
- Converted to Ambulance Station 1920s.
- Renovations for shop and residence 1994.

== Description ==
Ambulance depot, 1928. Older buildings at rear. Sandstone rear wall along back boundary. Sandstone brick wall on side boundary. Various dates to these structures. 1842–1843, 1870; Built By: 1840s

The building at No. 73 George Street North, The Rocks, the former Ambulance Station, is a two-storey masonry walled structure with a cellar and attached roof over a rear yard enclosed by sandstone boundary wall on two sides (now demolished). The building used to cover the entire site between George Street and Kendall Lane at the rear. The single pitched gable roof is of corrugated iron and is screened from George Street by parapets.

Style: Georgian Art Nouveau; Storeys: three including basement; Facade: 1928 Modelled Facade; Side Rear Walls: Sandstone brickwork; Roof Cladding: Corrugated Iron; Floor Frame: Timber, Concrete; Ceilings: 1st floor pressed metal.

=== Condition ===
As at 3 May 2001, archaeological condition assessed as partly disturbed. Assessment basis: Floor level with George Street, and terraced up to level of Kendall Lane. Investigation: Monitoring during works 1994. Evidence of deposits.

=== Modifications and dates ===
In March 1927 Howie Moffot & Co. submitted plans for alterations to the building and in 1928, after the completion of the facade and internal works, the Circular Quay Depot of the Central District Ambulance Service began operations.

== Heritage listing ==
As at 31 March 2011, the site became of State heritage significance for its historical and scientific cultural values. The site and building are also of State heritage significance for their contribution to The Rocks area which is of State Heritage significance in its own right.

The main building is significant in that it retains a majority of building fabric dating from 1842 and its site was an allotment subdivided by Frederic Unwin. The main building is also significant in remaining possibly the oldest surviving identifiable hotel building in The Rocks area. The sandstone and brick perimeter walls to the rear yard are significant in dating from the middle 19th century and demonstrate the hotel's yard evolution. The main building retains the potential for its return to its near original configuration and street appearance to complement this highly significant surviving 19th-century townscape precinct in George Street. The building and site has been associated with many uses throughout its long history, its use as a hotel being of predominate significance, and it illustrated the changing social fabric of the area which once had a concentration of public houses demonstrating the importance of the consumption of alcohol to the economy of the area. The construction of the building clearly demonstrates the form of 19th-century building techniques and the improved standards pertaining to a c. 1840 hotel building. The size and scale of the building continues to make an important contribution to the streetscape of George Street and sympathetic relationship to nearby similar buildings. The site has important associations extending back in history to the establishment of the first hospital in the colony in 1788 and also has significant associations with many 19th-century historical figures, including Surgeon William Balmain, Frederick Garling, Frederic Unwin. The site development illustrates the way an intensive urban use character evolved reflecting the growth of The Rocks Area generally.

High Significance Fabric: Remaining 19th-century fabric of east, west, south and elevations; remaining early 19th-century fabric of north elevation; remaining 19th-century wall enclosures. Medium Significance Fabric: Remaining late 19th-century fabric of north elevation; timber joists and pressed metal ceiling (first floor) Low Significance Fabric: 20th-century components of north, west and south elevations; 20th-century roof forms; visible 20th-century alterations, including joinery (ground floor); 20th-century partition wall and joinery, timber flooring and fluorescent lights and electric fan (first floor).

Shop, Ken Duncan Gallery was listed on the New South Wales State Heritage Register on 10 May 2002 having satisfied the following criteria.

The place is important in demonstrating the course, or pattern, of cultural or natural history in New South Wales.

The adaptation of the original Colonial hotel into an Art Nouveau utility building effectively illustrates the redevelopment of the Rocks, and Sydney. It has value as a greatly altered but remaining identifiable example of the early development in Sydney. The changing uses of the building are very significant i.e. hotel, Salvation Army, Naval and Military Home and Ambulance Station, in portraying the changing history of the precinct and Sydney. The infill building allows the historic pattern of early subdivision in 1841 by Frederic W. Unwin of The Rocks are to be clearly understood. The building has associations with significant 19th-century historical figures, including surgeon William Balmain, Frederick Garling senior and junior and Frederick Unwin.

The place is important in demonstrating aesthetic characteristics and/or a high degree of creative or technical achievement in New South Wales.

The later Art Nouveau facade is well detailed, and illustrates an important surviving adaptation of an early hotel building into a utility building. The form, scale, detailing and material of the facade contributes greatly to this very significant streetscape. This is particularly relevant with the many nearby buildings in The Rocks of the same architectural style, i.e. c. 1920-30's which all contribute to give the area a strong and rich historical character. The fine 1880s rock faced perimeter wall is significant as well detailed rear and side boundary wall.

The place has a strong or special association with a particular community or cultural group in New South Wales for social, cultural or spiritual reasons.

The use of the former early 1842 public house or hotel with "every convenience" is very significant to this period of the Rocks precincts and Sydney. The Salvation Army, Naval and Military Home use between 1911 and 1927 . The change of use to an Ambulance Station in 1927 is significant.

The place has potential to yield information that will contribute to an understanding of the cultural or natural history of New South Wales.

The form of early construction with a sandstone basement and three-storey brick building. The sandstone retaining walls supporting the brick wall above indicate an important early method of construction. The later 1927 alterations to the building and the transformation of the facade into a modern style of the time.

== See also ==
- Australian non-residential architectural styles
