= Pitt (East Indiaman) =

List of ships with the same or similar names

Two vessels with the name Pitt, after Pitt the Elder, have served as East Indiamen for the East India Company (EIC).

- Pondichéry, was the former French East Indiaman Pondichéry, which the British captured in 1757. Private owners purchased her and renamed her Pitt. She then made three voyages for the EIC, the first, under Captain William Wilson, resulting in the mapping of Pitt's Passage, and Pitt Strait. She disappears from records after her third voyage.
- Pitt, launched in 1780 as Fortitude, was captured and recaptured on her maiden voyage. She later made five voyages for the EIC between 1786 and 1798; during this time she also made one voyage transporting convicts from Britain to Port Jackson, New South Wales. She was sold in 1798 and broken up in 1801.
