= 145 George Street, The Rocks =

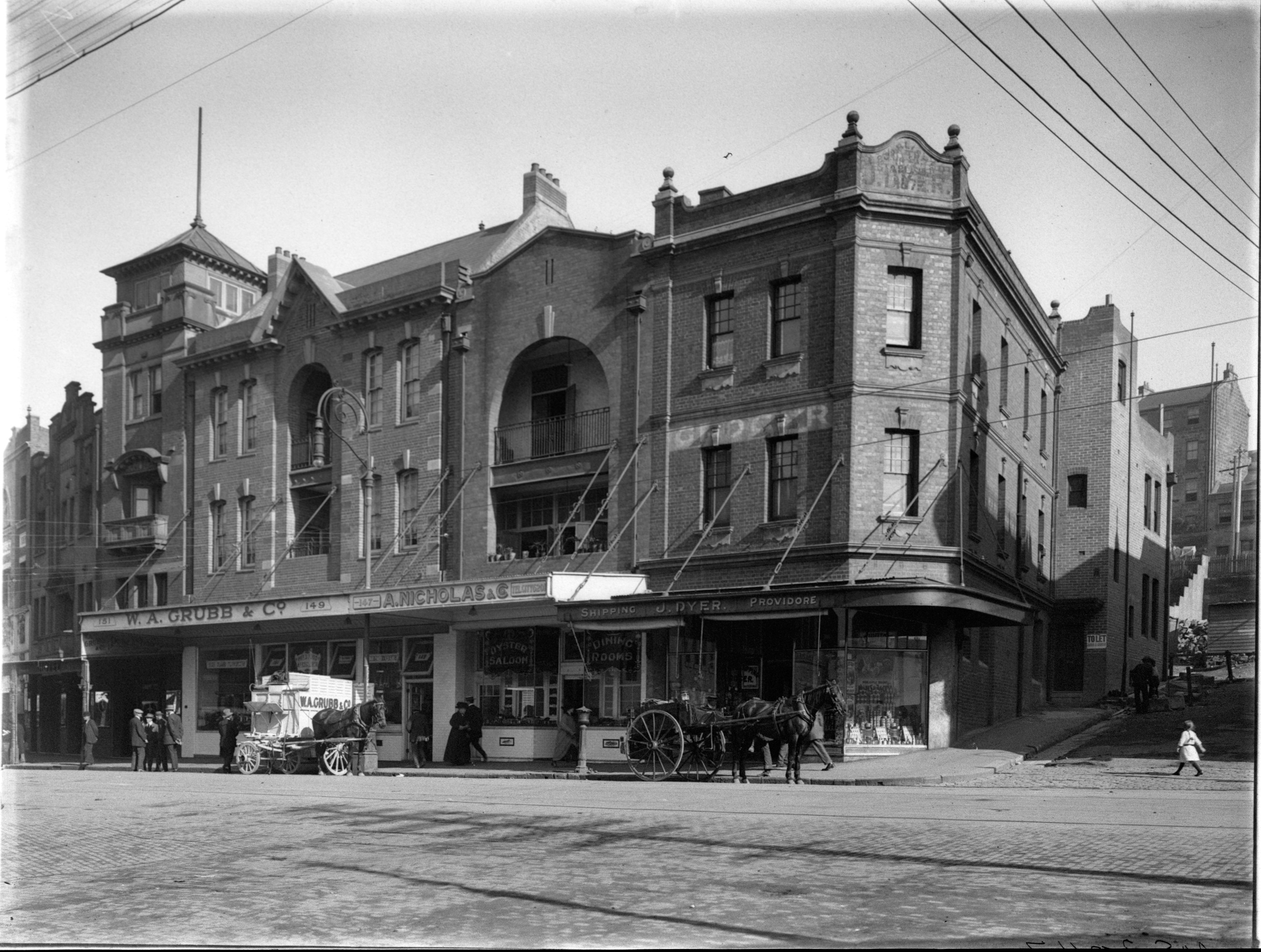
- 145 George Street, The Rocks, located on the corner of Globe Street; undated.

- Location within Sydney Location within Australia
- 33.8607°S 151.2083°E
- Location: 145 George Street, The Rocks, City of Sydney, New South Wales, Australia

History
- Built: 1892

Site notes
- Owner: Property NSW

New South Wales Heritage Register
- Official name: Shop and Residence; Currently part of Duty Free Store complex
- Type: State heritage (built)
- Designated: 10 May 2002
- Reference no.: 1584
- Type: Shop
- Category: Retail and Wholesale

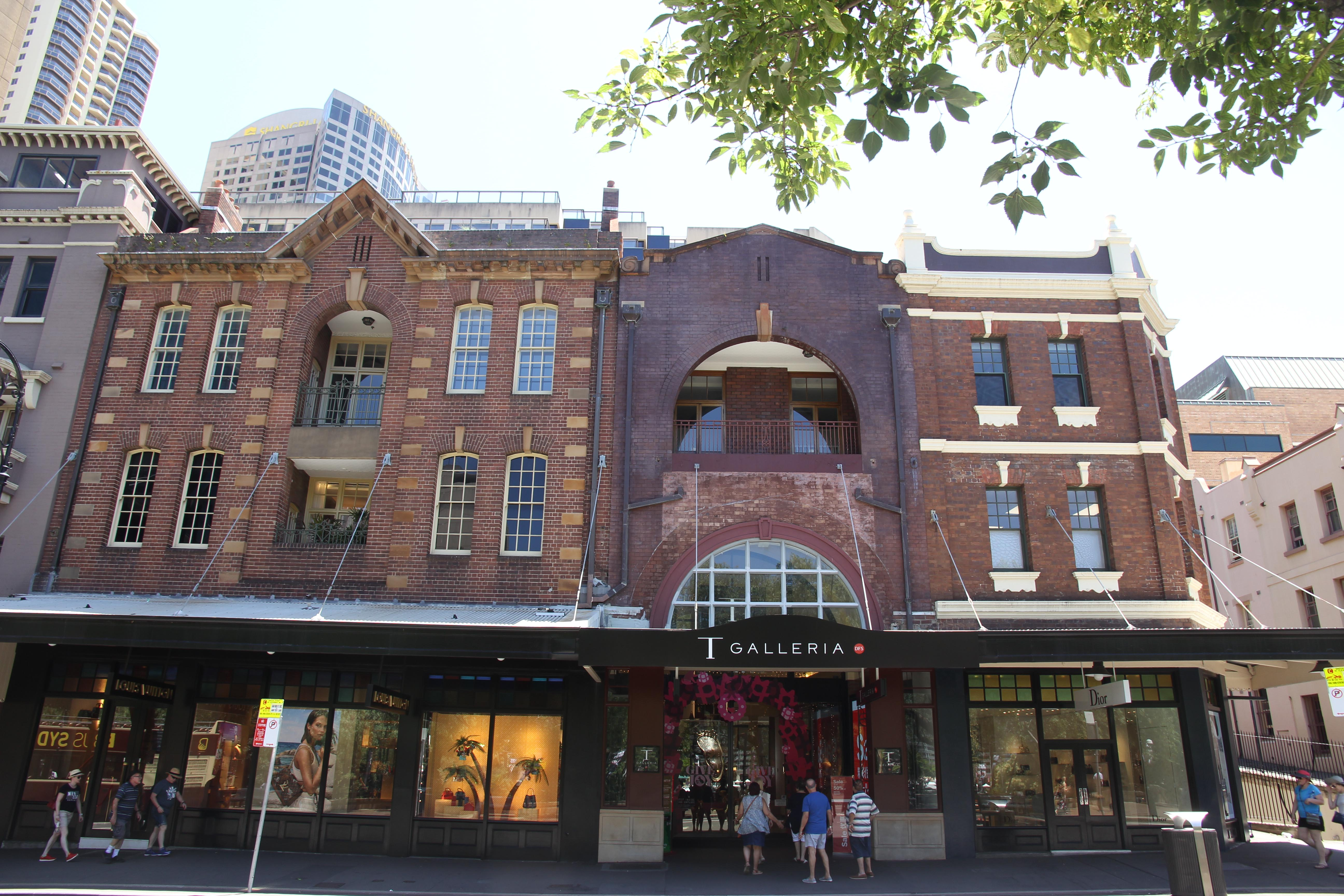
Photo taken in 2019, of the same scene as in the earlier photo, above

145 George Street, The Rocks is a heritage-listed duty-free store complex and former retail building and residence located at 145 George Street, in the inner city Sydney suburb of The Rocks in the City of Sydney local government area of New South Wales, Australia. It was built in 1892. It is also known as Currently part of Duty Free Store complex. The property is owned by Property NSW, an agency of the Government of New South Wales. It was added to the New South Wales State Heritage Register on 10 May 2002.

== History ==
As indicated by James Meehan's Survey of 1807 this site was first occupied by Surgeon General John White at Lot No. 4 and Captain William Raven at Lot No. 5. In c. 1835 Mrs Underwood was the owner of three storey stone shops and houses each with seven rooms. By 1845 a two-storey brick house and shop with a shingle roof and five rooms was built. Also on this same allotment at the corner of George and Globe Streets a two-storey stone and brick house and store was erected. The five roomed house had "every convenience". In 1861 this building was used as a "Bowling Alley" managed by William Ogilvie. In 1871 in the tenements erected by Underwood, a public house was opened. The inn was called the "Nil Desperandum Hotel". By 1882 three two storey tenements were erected between the butcher shop and the brick and stone shop on the north side of the Public House, known as the New York Hotel. These shops and dwelling were constructed of brick and they were roofed in iron. In 1891 the building to the south corner of Globe and George Streets was pulled down. By 1891 George McEvoy had erected houses to the Harrington Street frontage. The four storey buildings were of brick and stone and the roofs were slated. In c. 1906 these houses were pulled down. In 1892 a three-storey brick and slate roofed shop and dwelling was erected for the Trustees of the Church of England to 145 George Street. In 1900 the area was resumed under the Observatory Hill Resumption Act. In c. 1907 the New York Hotel was demolished and by 1908 Tooth & Co. Ltd. erected the brick and iron roofed building to 153–155 George Street. In 1912 the tenements to 149 and 151 George Street were pulled down, and in the same year a two-storey brick office building was erected to the rear of 145 George Street. During 1913 Quay Chambers at 149–151 George Street were erected. The tenement to 147 George Street was demolished in 1914 and in that same year the present three storey brick building was erected. In the 1970s the ground floor shop was occupied by Downtown and Dyer, Grocers.

In the 1980s the Duty Free Shop Group complex was constructed and the interior of the building gutted for the complex.

The site was identified as having European occupation since at least 1791, with other structures by 1822. From then on, site development was intense. In the 1890s, and following the resumption in 1900 the current buildings facing George Street were constructed.

== Description ==
The building is a three-storey face brick building on the corner of Globe Street, erected in 1892 as shops and offices. The building design can be described as an example of the transitional architecture of the late Victorian and early Federation periods. The upper parapet, rendered sills and keystones are typical of Victorian period detail, with the use of face brick more typical of the Federation period. As part of the development works of the 1980s a section of the building in Globe Street was demolished. At the time of the redevelopment the original awning and shopfront were reconstructed. In Globe Street a large services panel was inserted onto the rear of the ground floor and a new angled corner and false rear wall with blind windows facing the open gallery was created at that time.

Style: Late Victorian and Early Federation; Storeys: 3; Facade: Brick.

=== Condition ===
As at 27 April 2001, Archaeology Assessment Condition: Destroyed? Assessment Basis: Modern development. Basement car parks. No archaeological work appears to have been undertaken for this site although the 1986 Assessment indicated a potential, and important, resource. The subsequent building operations appear to have obliterated much of this resource. Possible deposits survive beneath shops on George Street frontage. Investigation: Historical research and assessment of archaeology: destroyed.

=== Modifications and dates ===
- DFS complex: 1988 (the redevelopment involved the demolition of the rear of the George Street buildings, the removal of interior and the creation of new shopfront).
- In 1914 to 157–159 George Street Nathan Jacobs erected the New York Theatre. The New York Theatre was demolished in 1937.
- This site was acquired by the Public Transport Commission in 1946 and the City Circle Railway, which traverses the site, was opened in 1956.
- In the late 1980s the site was developed with a large commercial historic building erected behind 145–155 George Street whilst the facades of the buildings were adapted.

== Heritage listing ==
As at 18 November 2008, 145 George Street, The Rocks, was constructed in 1893 as part of a group of four buildings and has State heritage significance for its historic and social cultural values.

145 George Street has historic significance at State level for having been the site of early European settlement and has been continuously occupied by Europeans since 1788. The site has historic significance at local level for its associations with several phases of late 19th and 20th century urban renewal. Firstly, the commercial development of The Rocks in the last decade of the 19th century when the building was purpose-built as a grocery store; secondly, the demolition and rebuilding of much of The Rocks under the Observatory Hill Resumption Act following the 1900 plague outbreak; thirdly association with infrastructure works, including the construction of the City Railway link and the Cahill Expressway, which dramatically changed the visual curtilage of the group; and lastly, the 1980s creation of The Rocks as a tourist destination, when the interior and rear of the building was altered to accommodate the Duty Free Store Complex. 145 George Street has historic significance at local level for its associations with Downton & Dyer, a prominent local business that started as a grocery store in the late 19th century, developed as a wholesale business and is currently a major dry food supplier company that continues to operate in Sydney in larger premises under the same company name.

The East Elevation of 145 George Street has high aesthetic significance at local level associated with being a representative example of a Victorian Regency style commercial building designed in the last decade of the 19th century. In the 1980s the West Elevation, much of the ground floor and upper floor interiors were altered. While this has reduced the ability to interpret the building's significance, the eastern façade contributes to the aesthetic and historic diversity of the George Street streetscape. A street awning, in keeping with the original design, was reinstated. Shopfronts while not identical to the original, were sympathetic in design and character to turn of the century shopfronts.

145 George Street forms part of a group of four commercial buildings (Nos. 145, 147, 149–151 and 153–155 George Street) which front the eastern portion of the DFS (Duty Free Store) complex. This group of buildings, bounded by Globe Street and the Cahill Expressway, mark George St's southern entry to The Rocks precinct. The facades of the four late 19th century and early 20th century buildings have streetscape qualities and character that contribute to the overall richness of a coherent and harmonious brick and stucco group of buildings located within The Rocks. Within its location in The Rocks, which has State heritage significance, the subject site and the building group as a whole, contributes to a precinct unique to NSW with its historic associations and streetscape character. The group is an important part of The Rocks Heritage Conservation Area being sympathetic in scale and character and an extension of the remaining earlier buildings of George St, presenting a unified streetscape. The buildings are tangible evidence of the redevelopment of The Rocks in the last decade of the 19th century and first decade of the 20th century. 145 George Street has high social significance as a contributory element associated with the historic character of The Rocks, which is held in esteem by the local community and the people of NSW.

Shop and Residence was listed on the New South Wales State Heritage Register on 10 May 2002 having satisfied the following criteria.

The place is important in demonstrating the course, or pattern, of cultural or natural history in New South Wales.

145 George Street is a three-storey face brick building on the corner of Globe Street. The building was erected between 1892 and 1893 as shops and offices. 145 George Street has associations as a built element within George Street and Globe Street. George Street is the oldest street in Australia and Globe Street is one of the earliest cross streets. 145 George Street has high significance at local level associated with a corner shop operating continuously on the site and managed by the same proprietor, for almost ninety years. The business changed in over 80 years from a single-owner grocery store to a wholesale providores. The company moved from The Rocks to accommodate an expanding business. 145 George Street has moderate significance at local level for its associations with the phase of redevelopment of The Rocks in the 1980s when the precinct was transformed into a major tourist attraction. The item meets this criterion at State level.

The place has a strong or special association with a person, or group of persons, of importance of cultural or natural history of New South Wales's history.

145 George Street has moderate historic significance at local level for its association with the grocery company, Downton & Dyer Ltd, who operated from The Rocks from 1879 before Jesse Dyer moved to the premises at the corner of Globe and George Streets in 1893. The company amalgamated to become Downton & Dyer in 1918.

The place is important in demonstrating aesthetic characteristics and/or a high degree of creative or technical achievement in New South Wales.

The four brick buildings (Nos. 145; 147, 149–151 and 153–155 George Street) of heritage significance, which as a group, provide evidence of two phases of commercial activity in The Rocks just before and just after the plague outbreak and subsequent resumption of land at the turn of the century. Although compromised by the loss of rear sections, ground floor interiors and street awnings in the 1980s, it remains a coherent and harmonious brick and stucco group. The buildings are the representative of the commercial architecture of the Federation period and the transitional phase prior to the turn of the century. They are tangible evidence of the redevelopment of The Rocks in the early 20th century and also the more recent redevelopment period associated with the SCA. These buildings also provide evidence of historical association with prominent local business such as W. A. Grubb butchers. The Central Sydney Heritage Inventory contains separate listings for the building facades of 145–151 George St. and the former New York Hotel at 153-155 George Street: "Of environmental significance for its contribution to an architecturally diverse and historically important commercial streetscape of heritage significance as physical evidence of the growth and consolidation associated with the maritime activities at Circular Quay". The group of four buildings was classified as part of the George Street Business Precinct by the National Trust of Australia in the mid 1970s: "A group of four compatible Edwardian buildings containing interesting and lively fenestration which combine to present a picturesque street elevation. The group acts as a sympathetic extension to the remaining earlier buildings of George Street in scale and character to present a unified streetscape". The above listings indicate that the primary significance of the group is their contribution to the historic streetscape as well as their aesthetic value as a group of Federation period commercial buildings.

The place has a strong or special association with a particular community or cultural group in New South Wales for social, cultural or spiritual reasons.

The Rocks in general has considerable significance to the general community of Sydney and the people of NSW as a heritage precinct. The Rocks of which the subject site forms a part, is important to the community's sense of place and is subsequently held in esteem. Shopping is a major activity within The Rocks area. As the first commercial district of Sydney relating directly to the ports and shipping, the area has developed a strong commercial focus, which is currently maintained by tourism. The subject site has maintained its historic association with shopping and retail. The item meets this criterion at State level.

The place has potential to yield information that will contribute to an understanding of the cultural or natural history of New South Wales.

The earliest and most substantial phase of building on the subject site and in close proximity occurred by 1822. These earliest buildings, located along the George Street frontage, comprised the Underwood Buildings, an adjacent shop to the north and Thomas Moore's house. Archaeological evidence from a series of cottages erected on the southern section of the site during the 1820-30s has probably been removed by later 19th and 20th century developments. Due to considerable disturbance related to construction works, the subject site has little scientific/ research significance and does not meet this criterion.

The place possesses uncommon, rare or endangered aspects of the cultural or natural history of New South Wales.

There are numerous examples of Victorian/Federation style corner shop buildings within The Rocks that are similar to 145 George Street. The item does not meet this assessment criterion.

The place is important in demonstrating the principal characteristics of a class of cultural or natural places/environments in New South Wales.

The shops and shopping district of The Rocks are representative of the continuing commercial use of the area and the change to tourism. 145 George Street is one of the group of shop buildings that operated in The Rocks from the end of the 19th century until the late 20th century. 145 George Street is representative of this group and meets the criterion at local level.

== See also ==
- Australian non-residential architectural styles
- 147 George Street, The Rocks
- 149–151 George Street, The Rocks
- New York Hotel, also known as 153–155 George Street, The Rocks
