= 149–151 George Street, The Rocks =

Heritage-listed building in Sydney, Australia

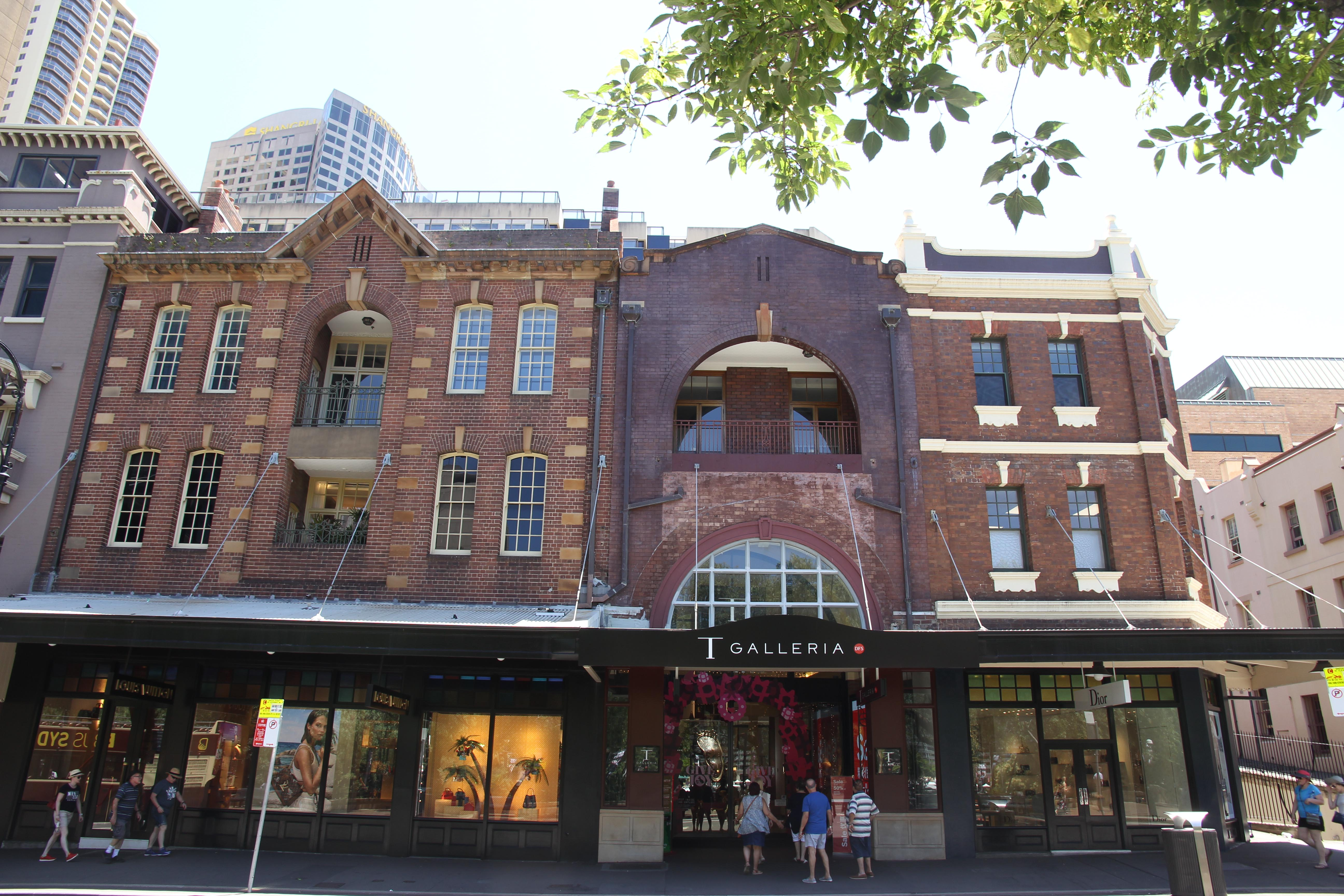
- 149-151 George Street is located on the left, pictured in 2019.

- Location within Sydney Location within Australia
- 33.8608°S 151.2082°E
- Location: 149–151 George Street, The Rocks, City of Sydney, New South Wales, Australia

History
- Built: 1913

Site notes
- Owner: Property NSW

New South Wales Heritage Register
- Official name: Shops and Residences; Currently part of Duty Free Store complex
- Type: State heritage (built)
- Designated: 10 May 2002
- Reference no.: 1594
- Type: historic site

149–151 George Street, The Rocks is a heritage-listed duty-free store complex and former retail building and residence located at 149–151 George Street, in the inner city Sydney suburb of The Rocks in the City of Sydney local government area of New South Wales, Australia. It was built from 1913 to 1913. It is also known as part of the Duty Free Store complex. The property is owned by Property NSW, an agency of the Government of New South Wales. It was added to the New South Wales State Heritage Register on 10 May 2002.

== History ==
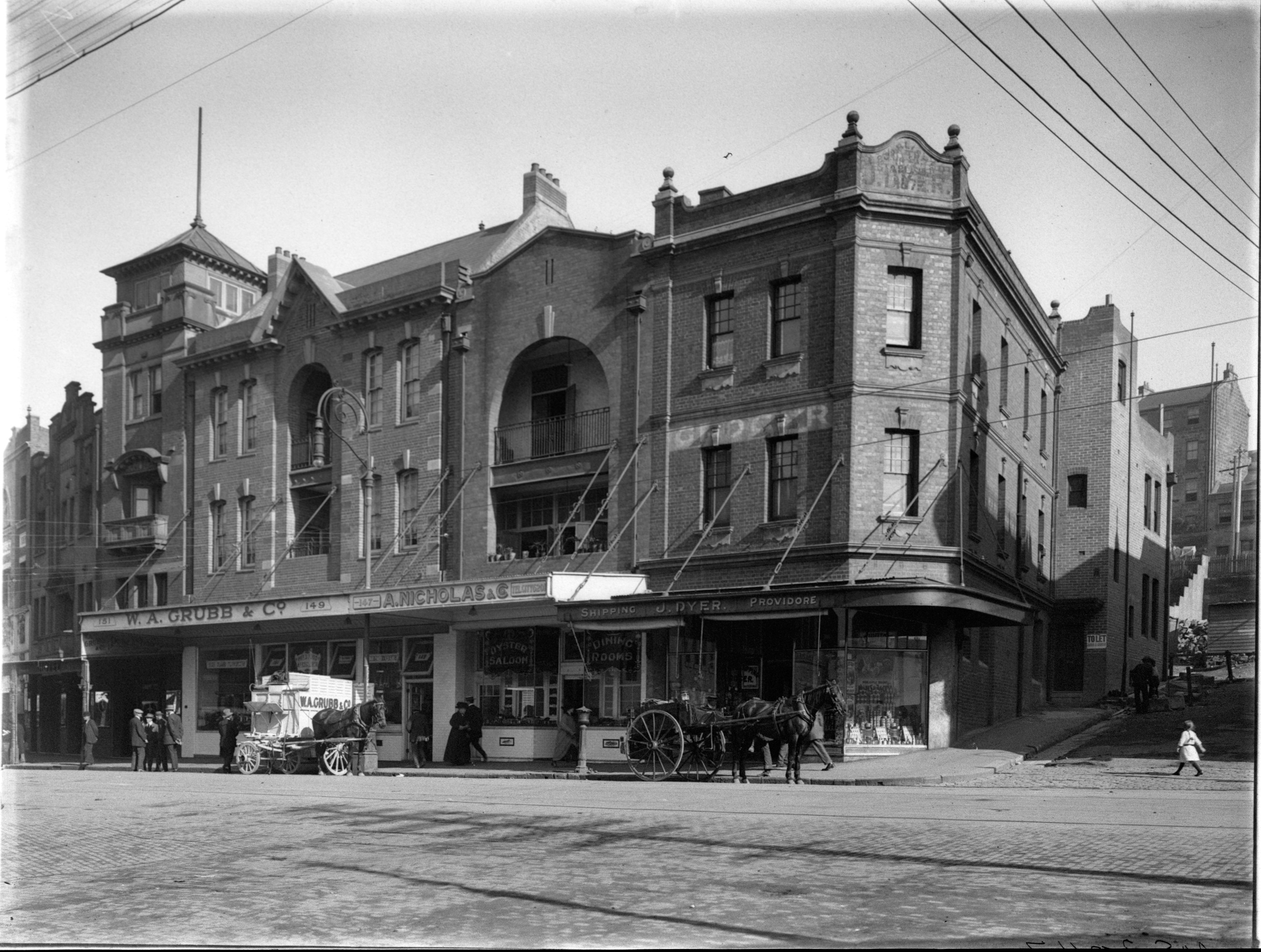
149–151 George Street, The Rocks, pictured at left, with awning W. A. Grubb, undated.

James Meehan's Survey of 1807 indicates that the subject site was first occupied by Surgeon General John White at Lot No. 4 and Captain William Raven at Lot No. 5. In c. 1835 Mrs Underwood was the owner and perhaps builder of three storey stone shops and houses each with seven rooms. By 1845 a two-storey brick house and shop with a shingle roof and five rooms was built. Also on this same allotment at the corner of George and Globe Streets a two-storey stone and brick house and store was erected. The five roomed house had "every convenience". In 1861 this building was used as a "Bowling Alley" managed by William Ogilvie. In 1871 in the tenements erected by Mrs Underwood, a public house was opened in today's No. 155 George Street, named the "Nil Desperandum Hotel".

By 1882 three two storey tenements were erected on the north side of the Hotel, which was at this time known as the New York Hotel. These shops and dwelling were constructed of brick and they were roofed in iron. In 1891 the building to the south corner of Globe and George Street (now 145 George Street) was demolished. In 1892 a three-storey brick and slate roofed shop and dwelling was erected for the Trustees of the Church of England at 145 George Street. In 1900 the entire Rocks area was resumed under the Observatory Hill Resumption Act after the outbreak of the bubonic plague. The New York Hotel was demolished in 1907 and by 1908 Tooth & Co. Ltd. Built the last New York Hotel, a brick and iron roofed building at 153/155 George Street.

In 1911 the tenements to 149 and 151 George Street were replaced by the current building which became known as the Quay Chambers.

W. A. Grubb is the longest tenant on the site, a butchering company with stores throughout Sydney. They operated at 147 George Street from 1905 until 1910 and when 149–151 George Street was built, they moved into those premises in 1912, remaining there until the 1980s when the site was redeveloped. The buildings just south of the subject site were demolished in 1937 and the site acquired by the Public Transport Commission in 1946 for the City Rail Link to Circular Quay, the line became operational in 1956.

In 1986 plans for the development of the site, comprising 145–155 George Street and 60 Harrington Street were developed. The proposal was for the development of the Harrington Street portion of the site. The development included the construction of a ten-storey office block with retail on the ground floor and an underground carpark. The development included changes to the commercial buildings facing George Street with new shopfronts and the reconfiguring of 147 George Street as an arcade entrance for the Duty Free Store (DFS). In 1998 further development work was undertaken on the Duty Free Store including retail fit outs the removal of a barrel-vaulted awing and the reinstatement of the current flat awning.

== Description ==
It was erected in 1913 as "Quay Chambers" and is also a face brick three storey building with typical Federation period characteristics; face brick, sandstone banded dressings and keystone and gabled parapet. Other features include a stone bracketed cornice and use of decorative metal work in the rainwater goods and awning support brackets. There are strong similarities in the way that the double level balcony opening is designed to that in the adjacent 147 George Street. In both cases the floor slab between levels is designed to emphasise the double height opening. W. A. Grubb & Co. butchers were the first tenants of the building, occupying the shopfront for many decades. The appearance of the shopfront was later modified by the conversion of a central door bay into a window and the application of tiles up to the window sill line, prior to complete removal and reconstruction as part of the mid-1980s redevelopment. Also removed at this time was the awning which had a soffit lining of Wunderlich pressed metal which also appears to have continued onto the adjoining awning at 147 George Street.

Style: Edwardian; Storeys: three.

=== Condition ===
Archaeology Assessment Condition: Destroyed? Assessment Basis: Modern development. Basement car parks. No archaeological work appears to have been undertaken for this site although the 1986 Assessment indicated a potential, and important, resource. The subsequent building operations appear to have obliterated much of this resource. Possible deposits survive beneath shops on George Street frontage. Investigation: Historical research and assessment of archaeology: destroyed.

=== Modifications and dates ===
- DFS complex: 1988 (the redevelopment involved the demolition of the rear of the George Street buildings, the removal of interior and the creation of new shopfront).
- In 1914 to 157–159 George Street Nathan Jacobs erected the New York Theatre. The New York Theatre was demolished in 1937.
- This site was acquired by the Public Transport Commission in 1946 and the City Circle Railway was opened in 1956.
- In the late 1980s the site was developed with a large commercial historic building erected behind 145–155 George Street whilst the façades of the buildings were adapted.

== Heritage listing ==
As at 31 March 2011, 149–151 George Street was constructed in 1911–12, a part of a group of four buildings and are of State heritage significance for their historical and scientific cultural values. The site and building are also of State heritage significance for their contribution to The Rocks area which is of State Heritage significance in its own right.

149–151 George Street has historic significance at State level for having been the site of early European settlement, continuously occupied by Europeans since 1788. The site has historic significance for its associations with several phases of 20th century urban renewal. Firstly the demolition and rebuilding of much of The Rocks under the Observatory Hill Resumption Act following the 1900 plague outbreak; secondly, an association with infrastructure works including the construction of the Cahill Expressway and the City Railway link, which dramatically changed the visual curtilage of the group; and lastly, the 1980s creation of The Rocks as a tourist destination, when the interior and rear of the building was altered to accommodate a Duty Free Store Complex.

149–151 George Street, forms part of a group of four commercial buildings (Nos. 147, 149–151 and 153–155 George Street) which front George Street and form the eastern portion of the DFS Complex. This group of buildings bounded by Globe Street and the Cahill Expressway, mark George St's southern entry to The Rocks precinct. The façades of the four late 19th century and early 20th century buildings, have streetscape qualities and character that contribute to the overall richness of a coherent and harmonious brick and stucco group of buildings located within The Rocks. The subject building also has local significance in its use of the arch as a dominant feature of the east elevation, as well as the clear division of the façade into thirds.

The four brick buildings (Nos. 145; 147, 149–151 & 153–155 George Street) of heritage significance, which as a group, provide evidence of two phases of commercial activity in The Rocks just before and just after the plague outbreak and subsequent resumption of land at the beginning of the 20th century. Although compromised by the loss of rear sections, ground floor interiors and street awnings in the 1980s, it remains a coherent and harmonious brick and stucco group. The buildings are representative of the commercial architecture of the Federation period and the transitional phase prior to the turn of the century. They are tangible evidence of the redevelopment of The Rocks in the early 20th century and also the more recent redevelopment period associated with the SCA. These buildings also provide evidence of historical association with prominent local business such as WA Grubb butchers. The Central Sydney Heritage Inventory contains separate listings for the building façades of 145–151 George Street and the former New York Hotel at 153–155 George Street: "Of environmental significance for its contribution to an architecturally diverse and historically important commercial streetscape of heritage significance as physical evidence of the growth and consolidation associated with the maritime activities at Circular Quay". The group of four buildings was classified as part of the George Street Business Precinct by the National Trust of Australia in the mid 1970s: "A group of four compatible Edwardian buildings containing interesting and lively fenestration which combine to present a picturesque street elevation. The group acts as a sympathetic extension to the remaining earlier buildings of George Street in scale and character to present a unified streetscape". The above listings indicate that the primary significance of the group is their contribution to the historic streetscape as well as their aesthetic value as a group of Federation period commercial buildings.

The significance of the subject site and the group is associated with its location in The Rocks, a precinct unique to NSW and its historic associations and streetscape character and qualities that contribute to The Rocks area. The group is an important part of The Rocks Heritage Conservation Area being sympathetic in scale and character and an extension of the remaining earlier buildings of George Street, presenting a unified streetscape. The buildings are tangible evidence of the redevelopment of The Rocks in the last decade of the 19th century and the first decade of the 20th, the period before and after the plague outbreak.

149–151 George Street was listed on the New South Wales State Heritage Register on 10 May 2002 having satisfied the following criteria.

The place is important in demonstrating the course, or pattern, of cultural or natural history in New South Wales.

149–151 George Street has associations as a built element within George Street, the Rocks, the oldest commercial centre in Australia. The building has moderate significance at local level associated with a butchery continuously operating on the site from the time the building was completed until its major renovation seventy years later. It also has significance for having purpose-built offices on the first and second floors. 149–151 George Street has moderate significance at local level for its associations with the phase of redevelopment of The Rocks in the 1980s when the precinct was transformed into a major tourist attraction. The building at 149–151 George Street is a three-storey face brick building erected in c. 1912 as a shop and offices. Stylistically, the building is an example of the transition between late Victorian and the Federation periods. The upper parapet, sandstone quoins and keystones are typical of Victorian period detailing, while the use of face brick is more typically a Federation detail.

The item meets this criterion at State level.

The place is important in demonstrating aesthetic characteristics and/or a high degree of creative or technical achievement in New South Wales.

The East elevation of 149–151 George Street has high significance at local level as a representative example of a commercial building in The Rocks designed in the Late Victorian and early Federation style. The building at 149–151 George Street has high significance at local level associated with the intactness of external elements and the retention of late 19th century and early 20th century streetscape elements conserved within the building group between Globe Street and the Cahill Expressway. 149–151 George Street has high significance at local level associated with buildings with landmark qualities, located between the Cahill Expressway and Globe Street, comprising 145, 146, 149–151 and 153–155 George Street. On entering the precinct from George Street this group of buildings contrast with the modernist brutalism of the Cahill Expressway and the 20th century modernist buildings located around Circular Quay and the central business district. The backdrop of the DFS buildings does not diminish the picturesque quality of the group.

The West Elevation of 149–151 George Street is a façade designed as part of the 1980s DFS development and as such contributes to the loss of design integrity. The interior of the building was removed in the 1980s development and little evidence of the architectural planning or fabric is retained internally. The item meets this criterion at local level

The place has a strong or special association with a particular community or cultural group in New South Wales for social, cultural or spiritual reasons.

The Rocks in general has considerable significance to the general community of Sydney and to the people of NSW as a heritage precinct. The fight to save The Rocks was a significant battle for local residents and the community. The Rocks is a highly visited tourist area, both by local and international tourists, for its historic character and associations as a remnant of the area first settled in Sydney. The Rocks, of which the subject site forms a part, is important to the community's sense of place that is integral to The Rocks as a whole and is subsequently held in esteem by the community.

Shopping is a major activity within The Rocks area, and as the first commercial district of Sydney relating directly to the port and shipping, the area has developed a strong commercial focus, which is currently maintained by tourism. The subject site has maintained its historic association with shopping and retail. The item meets this criterion at State level.

The place possesses uncommon, rare or endangered aspects of the cultural or natural history of New South Wales.

149–151 George Street is relatively unusual at a local level, for the use of a prominent central arch, emphasised by the appearance of the double height balcony spaces. The detailing of the face brickwork in combination with sandstone quoins, as well as the string course and gable, divides the façade into three vertical elements, which gives the building a very distinct configuration. The item meets this criterion at a local level

The place is important in demonstrating the principal characteristics of a class of cultural or natural places/environments in New South Wales.

The shops and shopping district of The Rocks are representative of the continued commercial use of the area, and the change in commercial demand from ports and shipping to that of tourism. 149–151 George Street is one of a group of shop buildings that operated in The Rocks from the end of the 19th century until the late 20th century. The item is a representative of this group. The item meets this criterion at local level.

== See also ==
- 147 George Street, The Rocks
- New York Hotel, also known as 153–155 George Street, The Rocks
- Australian non-residential architectural styles
