= Gannon House =

Gannon House and Shop
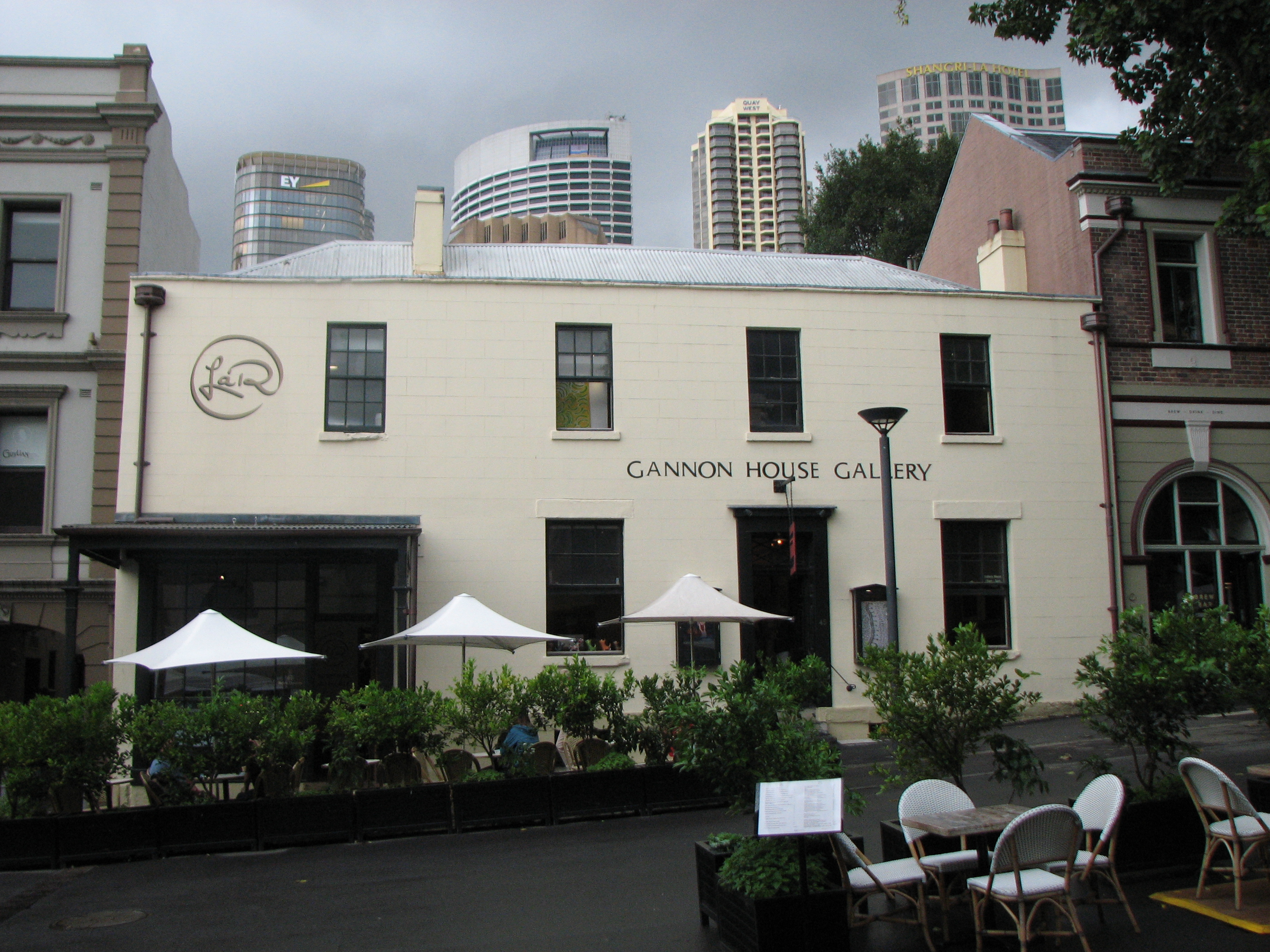
- Gannon House, 45–47 Argyle Street, The Rocks, New South Wales

- Location within Sydney Location within Australia
- 33.8594°S 151.2082°E
- Location: 45–47 Argyle Street, The Rocks, City of Sydney, New South Wales, Australia

History
- Built: 1839–1840
- Built for: Michael Gannon

Site notes
- Architect: Michael Gannon
- Architectural style: Colonial Georgian
- Owner: Property NSW

New South Wales Heritage Register
- Official name: Gannon House & Shop; Michael Gannon's House / La Renaissance Patisserie
- Type: State heritage (built)
- Designated: 10 May 2002
- Reference no.: 1548
- Type: Other – Residential Buildings (private)
- Category: Residential buildings (private)
- Builders: Michael Gannon

Gannon House is a heritage-listed retail building at 45–47 Argyle Street in the inner-city Sydney suburb of The Rocks in the City of Sydney local government area of New South Wales, Australia. It was designed by Michael Gannon and built from 1839 to 1840 by Michael Gannon as residential houses and stables. It is also known as Michael Gannon's House. As of 2019, it contains a Gannon House Gallery (an art gallery) and La Renaissance Patisserie (a cafe). The property is owned by Property NSW, an agency of the Government of New South Wales. It was added to the New South Wales State Heritage Register on 10 May 2002.

== History ==
The site had initially been part of the Hospital grounds, as part of the Assistant Surgeons residence and garden. When the hospital moved to Macquarie Street, Francis Greenway occupied the site as part of his salary as colonial architect under Governor Macquarie. When he was dismissed in 1822, he claimed that the residence and land had been promised to him by Macquarie. It appears even though the Government tried to repossess the site Greenway, remained there until c. 1834. The subject site lays just to the east of the residence.

Land title documents indicate that an allotment of land bounded by Argyle and Harrington Streets, Harrington Lane and Greenway's residence was leased by Governor Brisbane in 1823 to John Gleeson, a labourer for a period of twenty-one years. By 1826 the lease was apparently conveyed to Thomas Ryan; however, no transfer record has been located.

In 1830 William Reynolds apparently purchased part of the land from Ryan for £100, and in the same year, the subdivided land on the corner of Argyle and Harrington Streets was sold by Ryan to Frederick Wright Unwin. Unwin leased part of the site and building that occupied it, a stone tenement and boarding house, to Caleb Slater, who conducted a public house called the Kings Head. When City Section 84 was drawn up in 1834, most of the land between Harrington and George Streets on the southern side of Argyle Street was claimed by Francis Greenway.

Greenway was unable to prove his title to the land, and it was sold to Unwin for £2,820 by the Colonial government. By 1840, only a few years after the sale, hotels stood on both the Harrington and George Street corners of the block. In 1839 he leased about two-thirds of his allotment to Michael Gannon for 21 years for a ground rent of £170 per year. The lease required that Gannon build and erect on the line of frontage to George Street within two years as many houses that could occupy the frontage, three storeys exclusive of cellars and built of "substantially of good materials".

Per the lease, Gannon built on the Argyle Street part of the allotment very quickly, and he had constructed the New York Hotel on the corner of Argyle and George Streets, which opened in February 1841. Gannon built the two houses on the subject site in Argyle Street from 1839-1840. Gannon's workshops (builder, manufacturer of coffins) and timber yard occupied the premises' rear, as did several other tenants.

Gannon was bankrupted in the 1840s depression, and his estate seized in 1845; besides personal possessions, everything including household furniture was sold to pay off his creditors at auction. The family left the Argyle Street property in late 1845 and settled permanently on the Cooks River.

J. S. Hanson appears to have the leasehold on the two houses until 1860, when the original 21-year lease expired. The 1858 Trig survey shows that little had changed on the site since Gannon left the properties. The buildings were utilised for both residential and commercial use. In 1858 No. 45 was a boarding house, and No. 47 housed a bootmaker.

The 1865 Trig survey indicates that the workshops and stables constructed by Gannon had been demolished, the residence expanded with the construction of a rear wing and outbuilding, and several sheds are attached to the eastern wall. The shingle roof had been replaced with corrugated iron by this time.

William Yeoman purchased the buildings in July 1870 and occupied part of the site with his business. In July 1885, John Gill, a pastoralist from Moonbi, purchased the buildings and land. He had it surveyed and measured to ensure the description on the deeds was accurate. Gill died in 1889, but the properties remained with his trustees until the site was resumed after the plague broke out in 1900. The Crown formally acquired the site in 1903. The Government administered the Rocks area from that time, beginning with the Sydney Harbour Trust, then the Maritime Services Board.

45–47 Argyle Street are typical of the smaller, less pretentious, but still ambitious development taking place in Sydney and The Rocks of the 1840s. Comparison with like buildings of the period is getting more difficult as they have become rarer, but "lesser quality" residential buildings such as Susannah Place (1844) and more substantial houses of Argyle Place put Nos. 45-47 in context.

The building's location and changing uses in The Rocks provide further evidence of the historical development of the area, across the Nineteenth and Twentieth Centuries, in terms of its changing fabric, and the changes in its function as firstly the centre, and later an adjunct, of the City of Sydney itself. Its survival retains the presence of the earliest consolidation of the area, its later more intense development in the mid-nineteenth century, through government acquisition for "slum management" in 1903. The buildings have the great ability to reveal information about themselves and their construction, and archaeologically important in this regard.

The site's archaeological history is that it was part of the Hospital garden between 1795 and 1816. Francis Greenway was in occupation of the site from 1815. The site was granted to Frederick Wright Unwin on 15 December 1838.

== Description ==
The buildings comprise a two-storey structure, comprising a wide U-shape with the base towards Argyle Street, and are effectively one structure and form, identified as such by the shopfront of No. 47 and the windows either side of the centrally placed doorway of No. 45. This integrated construction is consistent with a low-cost development of the property. A low parapet with box gutter behind conceals the main hipped roof parallel to the street, which returns over the rear of No. 45, while that of No. 47 is covered by skillion roofs The rear wings enclose a courtyard. The ground floor is of stone and the first floor of brick construction with stud internal walls with lathe and plaster linings, all of which suggest a cost-conscious approach. While No. 45 is extremely intact both externally and internally in form and layout, the fabric detail of No. 47 is consistent with a major reconstruction of the rear wing in the late 19th century. Though adaptation of service rooms on each floor has taken place, the majority of rooms remain in their original format, with much of their original detail fabric quite intact, if covered by layers of subsequent paint decoration. The combination and juxtaposition of materials and their use is of great interest in understanding buildings of this type.

Style: Colonial Georgian; Storeys: No. 45 – two floors with seven rooms; No. 47 – two floors with three rooms; Internal walls: Lathe and plaster linings; Roof cladding: Galvanised iron and galvanised steel sheet, fixed over extensive remnants of the original timber shingle roof; Internal structure: Timber-frame; Floor frame: Ground floor stone – first floor brick construction; Roof frame: Shingled.

Archaeology notes: c. 1839. Two-storey buildings. Vestiges of another building along western wall of courtyard; Built by: c. 1840s.

=== Condition ===
As at 27 April 2001, the archaeological condition was assessed as partly disturbed. Assessment basis: Cellar under part of No. 45. Rear courtyard terraced into slope. Archaeology partly disturbed, however potential resources remain in rear yards and underfloor deposits. The archaeological resource on the footpath to Argyle Street disturbed to 350 millimetres (14 in) below footpath surface. An archaeological monitoring program was completed in November 2007.

=== Modifications and dates ===
A trigonometrical survey of 1858 showed the buildings in similar configuration though walls of the outbuildings differed from the 1844 plan. A small addition had been made at the south-east corner of Gannon's own building (No. 45). By 1865, the workshop and stable built by Gannon has been removed, and additional outbuildings and rooms had been added at the rear of both buildings. According to a photograph, the main change appears to have been that the shingle roof had been replaced by a new roof of corrugated iron. Multiple-paned glass sashes were situated in all the window openings. The ground floor windows were protected by shutters.

== Heritage listing ==
As at 22 January 2009, Gannon House and Shop and site are of State heritage significance for their historical, aesthetic and scientific cultural values. The site and building are also of State heritage significance for their associations with the early development of the precinct and contribution to The Rocks area and local personalities such as Greenway, Unwin and Gannon.

The buildings provide important evidence of the architecture, building practices and economy of the late 1830s and 1840s. No. 45 in particular is significant as a largely intact and complete example of a residence from that period. Nos. 45–47 Argyle Street is a rare example of dwelling with attached "office/shop" which demonstrates the social and economic climate of the area at this time. The changes to the shopfront and rear of No. 47 represent the changing requirements and development of the commercial use of the building which is also reflective of the changes in the precinct and local area.

Gannon House and Shop are prominent elements in the eastern section of Argyle Street primarily due to their modest scale and location surrounded by larger, more elaborately detailed buildings. They are the only survivors from the 1840s development on the south eastern section of Argyle Street and make a positive contribution to varied character and historical nature of the precinct.

Gannon House & Shop was listed on the New South Wales State Heritage Register on 10 May 2002 having satisfied the following criteria.

The place is important in demonstrating the course, or pattern, of cultural or natural history in New South Wales.

The site is historically significant as part of the first hospital and site of the surgeon's residence and garden. From 1816, on relocation of the hospital to Macquarie Street, it became part of a contested and sought after address and valuable piece of real estate in what was fast becoming the commercial heart of Sydney.

The site was a part of a larger land holding developed by F. W. Unwin by lease arrangement with local builder Michael Gannon form 1839, who as attracted to the site's prime location, close to the centre of mercantile and shipping activities.

The buildings were constructed as a dwelling with workshops and stables at the rear and attached "dwelling or office" in recognition of this prominent address, growth and development of the area and also demonstrated the building practices of the time and economy of the situation. Gannon constructed a number of "speculative" buildings on the land in the same sound, simple and contemporary style.

The buildings continued to be used for both residential and commercial purposes will into the 20th century and are historically significant as they demonstrate local life from the time of their construction and later evolution of the local area and shift from mixed use to solely commercial use, by the adaptation of both Nos. 45 and 46 and additions to the rear of No. 47.

The place has a strong or special association with a person, or group of persons, of importance of cultural or natural history of New South Wales's history.

The site is part of land associated with Francis Greenway, the first Colonial Architect, who was unable to prove his ownership of the land and forced to relinquish his claim. It was subsequently purchased by F. W. Unwin, prominent businessman, who was responsible for the development of the Argyle Stores complex among other business ventures in the colony. The site was leased to and developed by Michael Gannon, a recognised local builder and developer. The buildings were constructed by Gannon in 1839-40 as part of the lease agreement with Unwin and served as his workplace and residence until 1845.

The site and buildings were subsequently associated with a number of local identities and land owners until 1900, when they were resumed and vested with the Sydney Harbour Trust. The buildings have since been associated with Maritime Services Board, Sydney Cove Redevelopment Authority and Sydney Harbour Foreshore Authority who have all managed the use and maintenance of the site and buildings and surrounding area.

The place is important in demonstrating aesthetic characteristics and/or a high degree of creative or technical achievement in New South Wales.

Gannon House and Shop is a rare surviving example of a single dwelling with attached shop that demonstrates the early 19th century construction techniques, finishes and economy. The building illustrates simple Georgian style with little ornamentation and incorporates standard techniques and finishes with reflects the "speculative" nature of the overall development.

The form of the buildings, construction to the street frontage, lack of garden and incorporation of the "office/shop" represents recognition of the prime address and a shift in the style of residential accommodation during this period as the land in the area became more developed and densely populated.

Gannon House and Shop are prominent elements in the eastern section of Argyle Street primarily due to their modest scale and location surrounded by larger, more elaborately detailed buildings. They are the only survivors from 1840s development on the south eastern section of Argyle Street and make a positive contribution to varied character and historical nature of the precinct.

The place has a strong or special association with a particular community or cultural group in New South Wales for social, cultural or spiritual reasons.

Gannon House and Shop has been part of a busy and active precinct since 1840 and is associated with a number of owner-occupiers and tenants who were part of a closely knit working-class neighbourhood. The alterations and adaptations of the buildings, particularly to No. 47, represents to the ongoing commercial use of the buildings and development of the area. The building remains part of an active commercial "community" and is now also part of a busy tourist precinct and can be interpreted as part of the historic fabric of the area.

The place has potential to yield information that will contribute to an understanding of the cultural or natural history of New South Wales.

Gannon House, No. 45 Argyle Street is largely intact and as such demonstrates the architecture of the late 1830s and 1840s and domestic standards, spatial requirements and way of life and attitudes of its occupants from this time. The finishes and fabric of the building provides a valuable resource and reference to the type of interior decorations common to working-class houses. The attached "dwelling or office" and shop No. 47 Argyle St, also demonstrated the growth and development of the area as a changing commercial centre. The successive additions and alterations demonstrate the changing requirements and evolution of the area into a tourist precinct. The changes to the surrounding area and rear site boundaries also demonstrate changes land ownership and development of the area. The rear courtyard behind the buildings and neighbouring properties contain a unique resource for interpretation of these changes. Whilst partly disturbed, archaeological resources relating to the 1839-40s development of the site remain below the courtyard paving. Evidence relating to the earlier use and fabric of the building also significantly remains in the basement, walls and roof cavities.

The place possesses uncommon, rare or endangered aspects of the cultural or natural history of New South Wales.

Gannon House and Shop is a rare surviving example of a single dwelling with attached shop constructed in 1839-40 and only surviving part of the grouping of buildings constructed by Gannon and the area bounded by George, Harrington and Argyle Streets. The other buildings have been demolished or redeveloped. No. 45 Argyle Street in particular generally retains its original form and internal layout.

There are a number of dwellings and terraces dating from the same period remaining, however, these vary in scale and detail and do not have the some relationship between dwelling and shop.

The place is important in demonstrating the principal characteristics of a class of cultural or natural places/environments in New South Wales.

Gannon House and Shop is important as it demonstrates the growth and in particular the commercial development of the local area. The building form and use was influenced by its vicinity to what was the centre of mercantile and shipping activities in the colony with more recent adaptation of the building influence by its role in an active historic precinct and tourist destination.

== See also ==
- Australian residential architectural styles
