= New York Hotel =

New York Hotel (former)
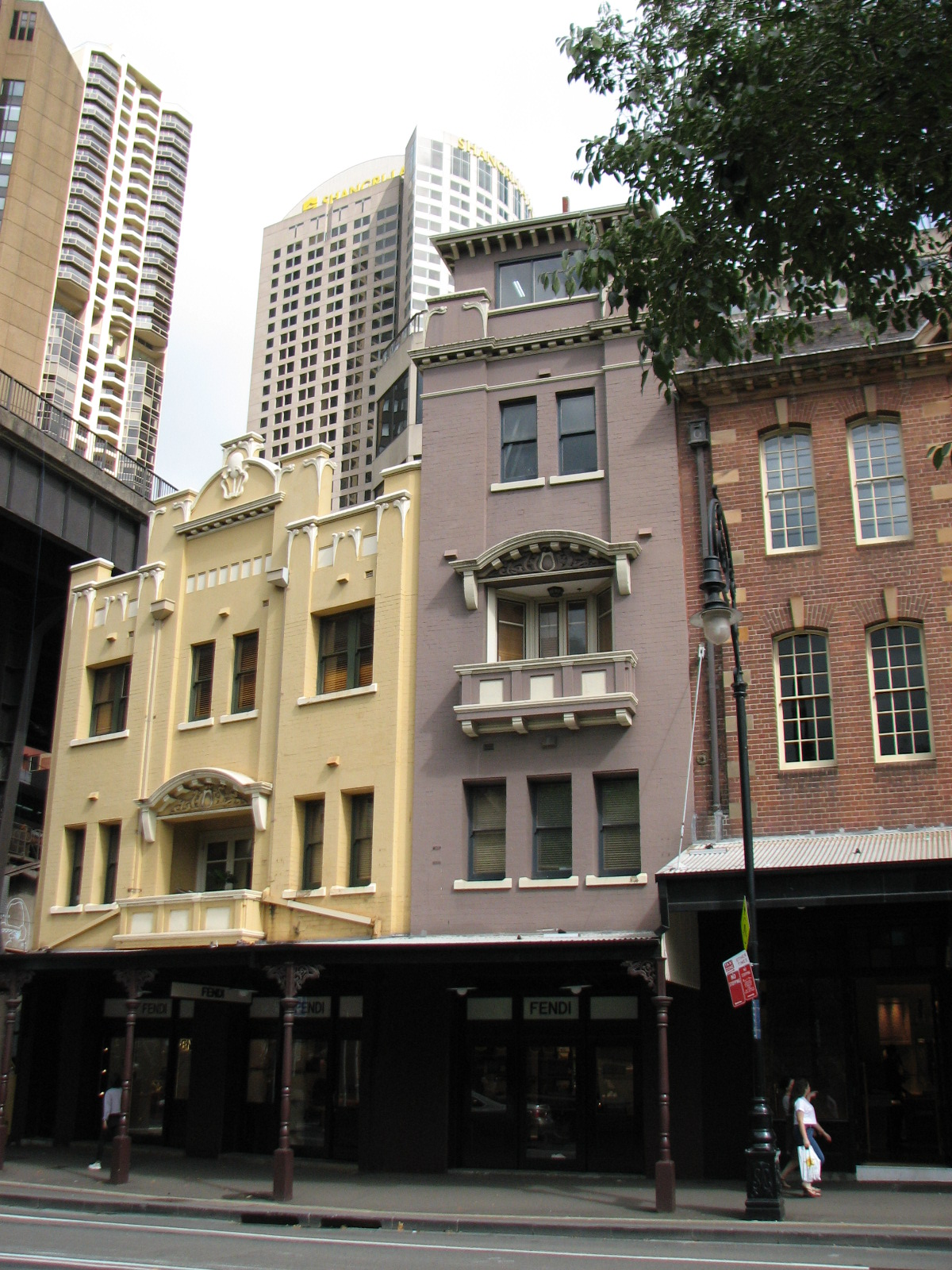
- New York Hotel 153–155 George Street, The Rocks

- Location within Sydney Location within Australia
- 33.8608°S 151.2077°E
- Location: 153–155 George Street, The Rocks, City of Sydney, New South Wales, Australia

History
- Built: 1908

Site notes
- Architectural style: Federation Free Style
- Owner: Property NSW

New South Wales Heritage Register
- Official name: New York Hotel (former) - DFS (Duty Free Store); DFS (Duty Free Store) Complex
- Type: State heritage (built)
- Designated: 10 May 2002
- Reference no.: 1563
- Type: Streetscape
- Category: Urban Area

The New York Hotel is a heritage-listed former hotel located at 153–155 George Street in the inner city Sydney suburb of The Rocks in the City of Sydney local government area of New South Wales, Australia. It was built during 1908. It is now part of the modern Duty Free Store complex. The property is owned by Property NSW. It was added to the New South Wales State Heritage Register on 10 May 2002.

== History ==
As indicated by James Meehan's survey of 1807, this site was first occupied by Surgeon General John White at Lot No.4 and Captain William Raven at Lot No. 5. In c. 1835 Mrs Underwood was the owner of three storey stone shops and houses each with seven rooms. By 1845 a two-storey brick house and shop with a shingle roof and five rooms was built. Also on this same allotment at the corner of George and Globe Streets a two-storey stone and brick house and store was erected. The five roomed house had "every convenience". In 1861 this building was used as a "Bowling Alley" managed by William Ogilvie.

In 1871 in the tenements erected by Underwood, a Public House was opened. The Inn was called the "Nil Desperandum Hotel". By 1882 three two storey tenements were erected between the butcher shop and the brick and stone shop on the north side of the Public House, then known as the New York Hotel. These shops and dwelling were constructed of brick and they were roofed in iron. In 1891 the building to the south corner of Globe and George Streets was pulled down. By 1891 George McEvoy had erected houses to the Harrington Street frontage. The four storey buildings were of brick and stone and the roofs were slated. In c. 1906 these houses were pulled down. In 1892 a three-storey brick and slate roofed shop and dwelling was erected for the Trustees of the Church of England to 145 George Street.

In 1900 the area was resumed under the Observatory Hill Resumption Act. In c. 1907 the New York Hotel was demolished and by 1908 Tooth & Co. Ltd. erected the brick and iron roofed building to 153–155 George Street. In 1912 the tenements to 149 and 151 George Street were pulled down, and in the same year a two-storey brick office building was erected to the rear of 145 George Street. During 1913 Quay Chambers at 149–151 George Street were erected. The tenement to 147 George Street was demolished in 1914 and in that same year the present three-storey brick building was erected.

The New York Theatre was erected at 157–159 George Street in 1914 by Nathan Jacobs. It was demolished in 1937. This site was acquired by the Public Transport Commission in 1946 and the City Circle Railway was opened in 1956.

The hotel ceased operation c. 1960. The Cahill Expressway had opened directly adjacent to the hotel in 1958. In the late 1980s a large commercial building, now known as the DFS Complex, was erected behind 145–155 George Street with the removal of most of the interior and the adaptation of the facades of the buildings involving mostly new shopfronts.

== Description ==
The brick and stucco building was constructed in 1908 and is a good example of what has been described as Federation Free Style architecture. It has two major elements, a five-storey tower section and a lower three storey section splayed at a slight angle to follow the change in the alignment of George Street. The building features elements typical of the style in its tower design and the art nouveau and classical motifs in the arched entablature over the balconies of both sections.

The remaining heritage fabric is in good physical condition.

== Heritage-listing ==
As at 30 March 2011, the former New York Hotel at 153–155 George St was constructed in 1908 for Tooth & Co Ltd, and has State heritage significance for its historical and scientific cultural values. The subject site has historic significance at State level for having been the site of early European settlement and continuously occupied by Europeans since 1788. The site has historic associations with three phases of 20th century urban renewal. The first phase of development followed the 1900 plague outbreak, a period of considerable rebuilding in The Rocks, when the building on the site was demolished and rebuilt under the Observatory Hill Resumption Act. The second phase is associated with infrastructure works, when the construction of the Cahill Expressway and the City Railway link, immediately south of the subject site, dramatically changes the building's curtilage. The third phase of construction is associated with the 1980s creation of The Rocks as a tourist destination, when the interior and rear of the building was changed considerable to accommodate a duty-free store. The subject site has high historic significance at local level for its associations with its use as a hotel form 1873 to 1960: the Nil Desperandum Hotel (1873–1880) and the New York Hotels (1882–1907 and 1908–1960). Physical evidence of its function as a hotel has been lost. The subject site has high scientific/research significance at State level associated with the archaeological potential of early structures of the Underwood Building and shop located on or near the site. Potential archaeological remnants could exist beneath the building and date to early settlement of the colony. The East Elevation of the former New York Hotel has high aesthetic significance at local level associated with being a representative example of a Federation Free Style commercial building designed in the 1st decade of the 20th century. In the 1980s the rear elevation, much of the ground floor and upper floor interiors, shopfronts and street awnings were altered. While this has reduced the ability to interpret the building's significance, the eastern façade contributes to the aesthetic and historic diversity of the George St streetscape. The former New York Hotel forms part of a group of four commercial buildings (Nos 145, 147, 149–151 and 153–155 George St) which front George St and form the eastern portion of the DFS (Duty Free Store) Complex. This group of buildings bounded by Globe St and the Cahill Expressway mark George St's southern entry to The Rocks precinct. The facades of the four late 19th century and early 20th century buildings have streetscape qualities and character that contribute to the overall richness of a coherent and harmonious brick and stucco group of buildings located within The Rocks. The significance of the subject site and the group is associated with its location in The Rocks, a precinct unique to NSW and its historic associations and streetscape character and qualities that contribute to The Rocks area which has State heritage significance in its own right. The group is an important part of The Rocks Heritage Conservation Area being sympatric in scale and character and an extension of the remaining earlier buildings of George St, presenting a unified streetscape. The buildings are tangible evidence of the redevelopment of The Rocks in the 1900s. The former New York Hotel has high social significance as a contributory element associated with the historic character of The Rocks, which is held in esteem by the community.

The former New York Hotel was listed on the New South Wales State Heritage Register on 10 May 2002 having satisfied the following criteria.

The place is important in demonstrating the course, or pattern, of cultural or natural history in New South Wales.

153–155 George St has exceptional significance at State level for its associations as a built element within George St. George St was the first road created in the settlement of NSW and thus the oldest road in the country. The history of George St (North) and its uses and changes since 1788, illustrate and inform the aspirations and way of life of Europeans in Australia. George St (North) is historically significant because it shows the continuity of European settlement in this area. Since its creation George St (North) has had numerous alignments and widenings. The subject site reflects the angle in the alignment of the road along it George St frontage. The design and form of both the site and the building expresses this alignment. 153-155 George St has high significance at local level for its associations with an historic phase, the first decade of the 20th century, when the urban development of The Rocks was impacted by the plague of 1900. The Observatory Hill Resumption Act resulted in the resumption of large tracts of land. Post plague redevelopment of The Rocks saw the demolition of a large number of buildings and the construction of new buildings that met health standards and requirements. This included the demolition of the New York Hotel in 1907 and the construction of the replacement New York Hotel in 1908 by owners, Tooth & Co Ltd. 153–155 George St has high significance at local level associated with hotels and public houses continuously operating on the site for almost 90 years. Hotels operating on the site included the Nil Desperandum Hotel from 1873–1880 and the New York Hotel from 1882–1960. These hotels were among the numerous similar premises that gave The Rocks its unique character, recognisable in the 1880s until the 1960s with fewer public houses operating as such today. 153–155 George St has moderate significance at local level for its associations with urban changes in The Rocks including the construction of the Sydney Harbour Bridge and associated transport infrastructure, in particular the Cahill Expressway and the City Rail link to Circular Quay. Buildings adjoining the subject site to the south were demolished to make way for infrastructure which severed The Rocks precinct from the central business district. 153–155 George St has moderate significance at local level for its associations with the phase of redevelopment of The Rocks in the 1980s when the precinct was transformed into a major tourist attraction. The item meets this criterion at State level.

The place is important in demonstrating aesthetic characteristics and/or a high degree of creative or technical achievement in New South Wales.

The East Elevation of 153–155 George St has high significance at local level as a representative example of a commercial building in the Rocks designed in the Federation Free Style. The East Elevation expresses the change of alignment of George St through the expression of the tower structure. The building at 153-155 George St has high significance at local level associated with the intactness of external elements and the retention of early 20th century streetscape elements conserved with the building group between Globe St and the Cahill Expressway. 153–155 George St has high significance at local level associated with a group of buildings with landmark qualities. On entering the precinct from George St this group of buildings is the gateway to The Rocks. The scale of the group of buildings between the Cahill Expressway and Globe St contrast with the modernist brutalism of the Cahill Expressway and the 20th century modernist buildings located within George St south of the Cahill Expressway, Circular Quay and the city generally. The backdrop of the DFS buildings does not diminish the picturesque quality of the group. The West Elevation of 153-155 George St is a façade designed as part of the 1980s development and as such contributes to the loss of design integrity. The interior of the building was removed in the 1980s development and little evidence of the architectural planning or fabric is retained internally. The item meets this criterion at local level.

The place has a strong or special association with a particular community or cultural group in New South Wales for social, cultural or spiritual reasons.

The Rocks has considerable significance to the people of Sydney and NSW as a heritage precinct. The fight to "Save The Rocks" was a significant battle for local residents and the community. The Rocks is a highly visited tourist area. It is visited by both local and international tourists and Sydney-siders who go to the area for its historic character and associations as a remnant of the area first settled in Sydney. The Rocks, of which the subject site forms part is important to the community's sense of place. As an element within The Rocks, 153-155 George St, provides a sense of place that is integral to The Rocks as a whole and is subsequently held in esteem by the community. The item meets this criterion at State level.

The place has potential to yield information that will contribute to an understanding of the cultural or natural history of New South Wales.

The earliest and most substantial phase of building on the subject site and in its close proximity occurred by 1822. These earliest buildings, located along the George St frontage, comprised the Underwood Building, an adjacent shop to the north and Thomas Moore's house. The impact of the site on these very large, multi-storeyed, well constructed, brick and stone buildings would have been extensive and it is highly probable that intact evidence still remains in the archaeological record. In the case of the Underwood Building and adjacent shop this evidence is likely to be found beneath the existing building or in the immediate vicinity of them. Archaeological evidence on the southern section of the site has probably been removed by later developments.

The place is important in demonstrating the principal characteristics of a class of cultural or natural places/environments in New South Wales.

The former New York Hotel is one of a group of hotel buildings that operated in The Rocks from the end of the 19th century until the mid 20th century. With the reduced need for public houses many of these pubs have been adaptively reused for retail and office purposes. The item, 153-155 George St is a representative example of this group. The item meets this criterion at local level.

== See also ==
- 149-151 George Street, The Rocks
- Gannon House
