= 147 George Street, The Rocks =

Heritage-listed building in Sydney, Australia

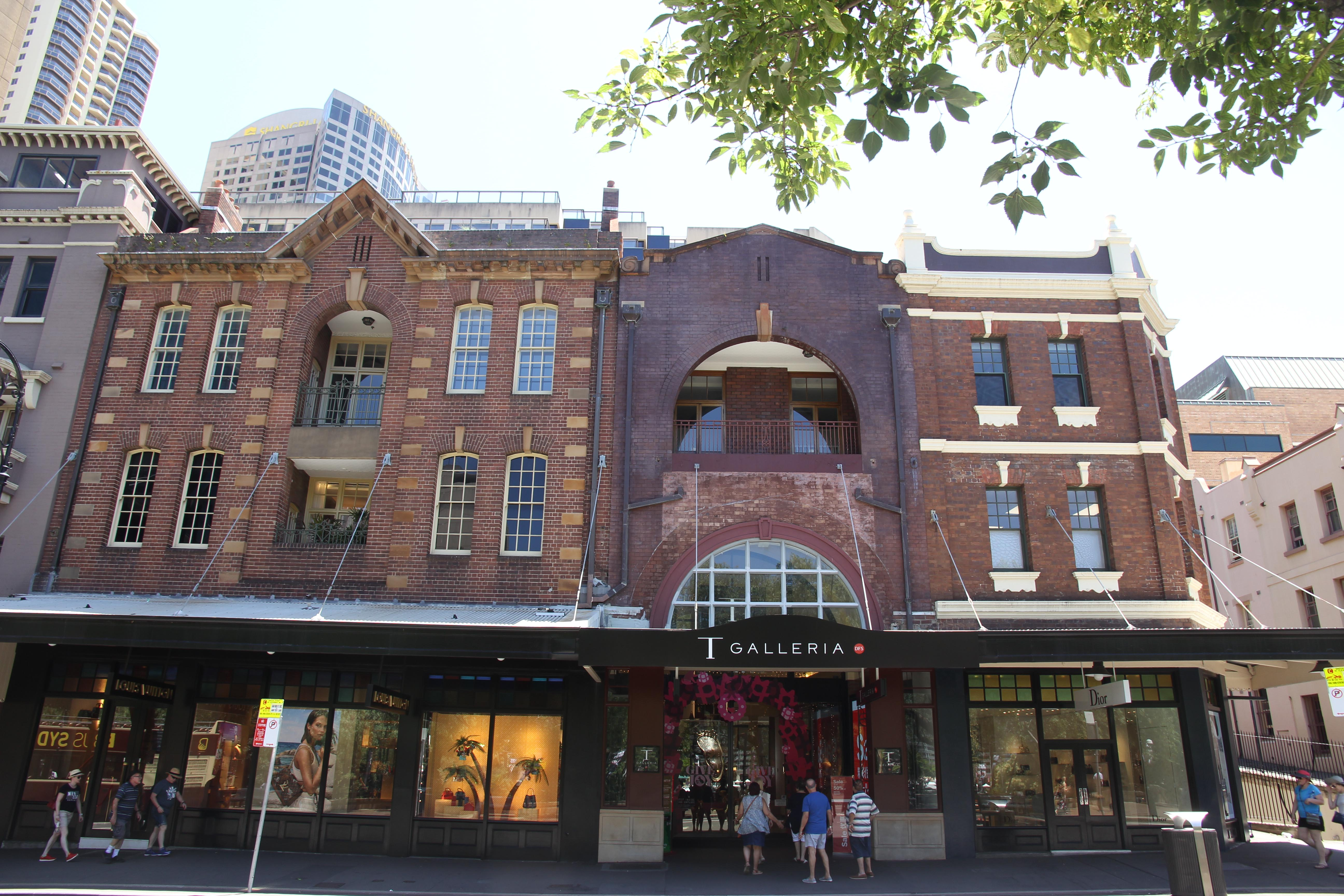
- 147 George Street is located second from right, pictured in 2019.

- Location within Sydney Location within Australia
- 33.8607°S 151.2083°E
- Location: 147 George Street, The Rocks, City of Sydney, New South Wales, Australia

History
- Built: 1914

Site notes
- Architectural style: Federation Free Classical
- Owner: Property NSW

New South Wales Heritage Register
- Official name: Shop and Residence; Currently part of Duty Free Store complex
- Type: State heritage (built)
- Designated: 10 May 2002
- Reference no.: 1585
- Type: Shop
- Category: Retail and Wholesale

147 George Street, The Rocks is a heritage-listed former retail building and residence and now duty-free store complex located at 147 George Street, in the inner city Sydney suburb of The Rocks in the City of Sydney local government area of New South Wales, Australia. It was built during 1914. It is also known as part of a Duty Free Store complex. The property is owned by Property NSW, an agency of the Government of New South Wales. It was added to the New South Wales State Heritage Register on 10 May 2002.

== History ==
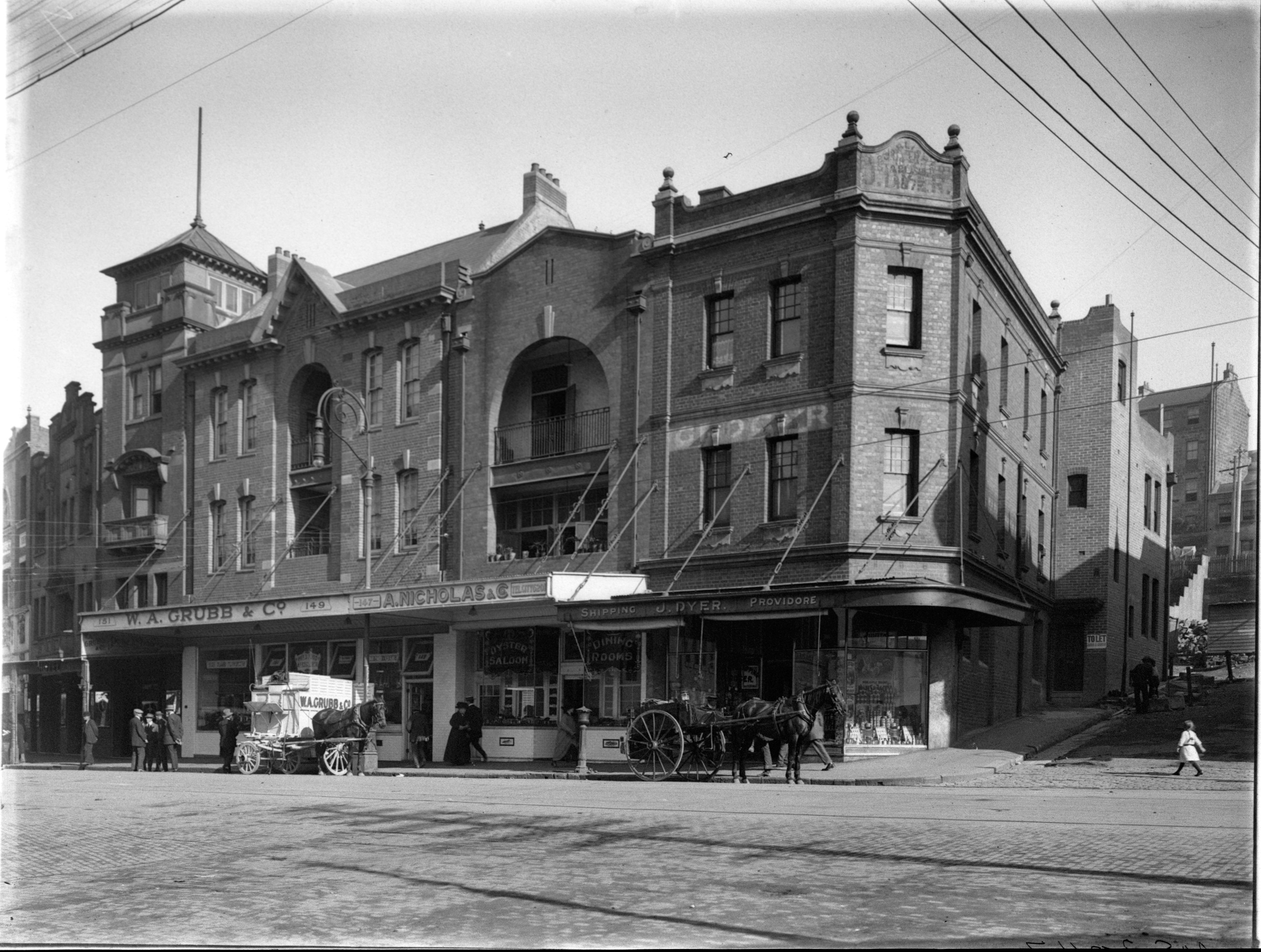
145-151 George Street, The Rocks, undated.

As indicated by James Meehan's Survey of 1807 this site was first occupied by Surgeon General John White at Lot No. 4 and Captain William Raven at Lot No. 5. In c. 1835 Mrs Underwood was the owner of three storey stone shops and houses each with seven rooms. By 1845 a two-storey brick house and shop with a shingle roof and five rooms was built. Also on this same allotment at the corner of George and Globe Streets a two-storey stone and brick house and store was erected. The five roomed house had "every convenience". In 1861 this building was used as a "Bowling Alley" managed by William Ogilvie. In 1871 in the tenements erected by Underwood, a public house was opened called the "Nil Desperandum Hotel". By 1882 three two storey tenements were erected between the butcher shop and the brick and stone shop on the north side of the Public House, now known as the New York Hotel. These shops and dwelling were constructed of brick and they were roofed in iron. In 1891 the building to the south corner of Globe and George Streets was pulled down. By 1891 George McEvoy had erected houses to the Harrington Street frontage. The four storey buildings were of brick and stone and the roofs were slated but these houses were pulled down in 1906. In 1892 a three-storey brick and slate roofed shop and dwelling was erected for the Trustees of the Church of England to 145 George Street. In 1900 the area was resumed under the Observatory Hill Resumption Act. The New York Hotel was demolished in 1907 and by 1908 Tooth & Co. Ltd. erected the brick and iron roofed building to 153/155 George Street. In 1912 the tenements to 149 and 151 George Street were pulled down, and in the same year a two-storey brick office building was erected to the rear of 145 George Street. During 1913 Quay Chambers at 149-151 George Street were erected. The tenement to 147 George Street was demolished in 1914 and in that same year the present three storey brick building was erected.

The site was identified as having European occupation since at least 1791, with other structures by 1822. From then on, site development was intense. In the 1890s, and following the Resumption in 1900 the current buildings facing George Street were constructed.

== Description ==
It is a simple but imposing three storey dark face brick building constructed in 1914 in a Federation Free Classical style replacing an existing tenement demolished as part of the slum clearances. Its prominent feature is a large semi-circular double storey verandah opening which was dramatically altered by the construction of a semi-circular awning/entrance in the 1980s redevelopment. The building uses small amount of sandstone in the capping to the gable parapet and keystone. The shopfront with a central entry and tiling to waist height, which existed during the Nicholas occupation in the 1930s had been modified by the 1980s. The 1980s redevelopment completely removed the shopfront to create a double level entrance to the modern development at the rear of the site.

=== Modifications and dates ===
- DFS complex: 1988 (the redevelopment involved the demolition of the rear of the George Street buildings, the removal of interior and the creation of new shopfront).
- In 1914 to 157–159 George Street Nathan Jacobs erected the New York Theatre. The New York Theatre was demolished in 1937. This site was acquired by the Public Transport Commission in 1946 and the City Circle Railway was opened in 1956.
- In the late 1980s the site was developed with a large commercial historic building erected behind 145-155 George Street whilst the facades of the building were adapted.

== Heritage listing ==
As at 19 November 2008, 147 George Street was constructed in 1911, a part of a group of four buildings, and has State Heritage significance for its historic and social values.

147 George Street has historic significance at State level for having been the site of early European settlement, continuously occupied by Europeans since 1788. The site has historic significance at local level for its associations with several phases of 20th century urban renewal. Firstly, the demolition and rebuilding of much of The Rocks under the Observatory Hill Resumption Act following the 1900 plague outbreak; secondly, an association with infrastructure works including the construction of the Cahill Expressway and the City Railway link, which dramatically changed the visual curtilage of the group; and lastly, the 1980s creation of The Rocks as a tourist destination, when the interior and rear of the building was altered to accommodate a Duty Free Store (DFS) Complex.

147 George Street forms part of a group of four commercial buildings (Nos 145, 147, 149-151 & 153-155 George Street) which front George Street and form the eastern portion of the DFS Complex. This group of buildings, bounded by Globe Street and the Cahill Expressway, mark George St's southern entry to The Rocks precinct. The facades of the four late 19th century and early 20th century buildings, have streetscape qualities and character that contribute to the overall richness of a coherent and harmonious brick and stucco group of buildings located within The Rocks. The subject building also has local significance in its use of the arch as the dominant feature of the east elevation.

The significance of the subject site and the group is associated with its location in The Rocks, a precinct unique to NSW and its historic associations and streetscape character and qualities that contribute to The Rocks area, which has State heritage significance in its own right. The group is an important part of The Rocks Heritage Conservation Area being sympathetic in scale and character and an extension of the remaining earlier buildings of George Street, presenting a unified streetscape. The buildings are tangible evidence of the redevelopment of The Rocks in the last decade of the 19th century and the first decade of the 20th century, the period before and after the plague outbreak. 147 George Street has high social significance as a contributory element associated with the historic character of The Rocks, which is held in esteem by the local community and to the people of NSW.

147 George Street was listed on the New South Wales State Heritage Register on 10 May 2002 having satisfied the following criteria.

The place is important in demonstrating the course, or pattern, of cultural or natural history in New South Wales.

147 George Street, The Rocks has associations as a built element within George Street. George Street was the first road created in NSW and is thus the oldest road in Australia. The history of George Street (north) and its uses & changes since 1788, illustrate and inform the aspirations and way of life of Europeans in Australia. The Rocks was impacted by the plague of 1900. The Observatory Hill Resumption Act resulted in the resumption of large tracts of land. Post-plague re-development of The Rocks saw the demolition of a large number of buildings and the construction of new buildings that met health standards and requirements. 147 George Street was impacted by the urban development as were the other buildings in the group of four (except 145 George Street). 147 George Street has moderate significance at local level associated with the provision and retail of fish to the local area, continuously operating on the site for almost 70 years. As a part of the district of The Rocks it has association with maritime use and the sale and consumption of fish. 147 George Street has moderate significance at local level for its associations with the phase of redevelopment of The Rocks in the 1980s when the precinct was transformed into a major tourist attraction. As part of the development works in the 1980s a western portion of the building was demolished and a false wall with arched arcade opening constructed, the West elevation that faces onto an open gallery. At the time of the redevelopment the original awning and shopfront were removed and a new awning constructed. 147 George Street is a three-storey face brick building located within a block bounded by Globe Street and the Cahill Expressway overpass. The building was erected around 1911 as shops and offices. Stylistically, the building is an example of a Federation Free Style building. The sandstone gable, keystones and the use of face brick is typically Federation detail. The item meets this criterion at State level.

The place has a strong or special association with a person, or group of persons, of importance of cultural or natural history of New South Wales's history.

The item does not exhibit any associations with a notable person or a group of persons from the local or wider NSW history. The item does not meet this criterion.

The place is important in demonstrating aesthetic characteristics and/or a high degree of creative or technical achievement in New South Wales.

The East Elevation of 147 George Street, The Rocks, has been modified substantially below the 2nd floor and has little significance at a local level. The East elevation on the second floor and above has high significance at local level associated with its level of intactness of external elements and as a representative example of a commercial building in The Rocks designed in the Federation Free Style. The single arch, providing the dominant design element of the elevation, is rather unusual and contrasts with the small openings usually associated with masonry construction of this era. While the changes to the elevation carried out in the 1980s are considerable, they have utilised the design element of the arch in keeping with the character of the late 19th and early 20th-century streetscape elements conserved within the building group, and reflect the aesthetic approach of its time.

147 George Street has high significance at local level associated with a group of buildings between the Cahill Expressway and Globe Street, comprising 145, 147, 149-151 & 153-155 George Street, with landmark qualities. On entering the precinct from George Street this group of buildings is the gateway to The Rocks. The scale of the group contrasts with the modernist brutalism of the Cahill Expressway and the 20th-century modernist buildings located around Circular Quay and the central business district. The backdrop of the DFS building does not diminish the picturesque quality of the group.

The West elevation of 147 George Street is a façade designed as part of the 1980s DFS development as such contributes to the loss of design integrity. The interior of the building was removed in the 1980s redevelopment and little evidence of the architectural planning or fabric is retained internally. The item meets this criterion at the local level.

The place has a strong or special association with a particular community or cultural group in New South Wales for social, cultural or spiritual reasons.

The Rocks, in general, has considerable significance to the general community of Sydney and people of NSW as a heritage precinct. The fight to "Save The Rocks" was a significant battle for the local residents and the community. The Rocks is a highly visited tourist area; visited by Sydneysiders and international tourists for its historic character and associations as a remnant of the area first settled in Sydney. The Rocks, of which the subject site forms part, is important to the community's sense of place. As an element within The Rocks, 147 George Street, provides a sense of place that is integral to the area as a whole and is subsequently held in esteem by the local community. Shopping is a major activity within The Rocks area. As the first commercial district of Sydney relating directly to the ports and shipping, the area has developed a strong commercial focus, which is currently maintained by tourism. The subject site has maintained its historic association with shopping and retail. The item meets this criterion at a State level.

The place has potential to yield information that will contribute to an understanding of the cultural or natural history of New South Wales.

The earliest and most substantial phase of building on the subject site and in close proximity occurred by 1822. These earliest buildings, located along the George Street frontage, comprised the Underwood buildings, and adjacent shop to the north and Thomas Moore's house. Archaeological evidence from a series of cottages erected on the southern section of the site during the 1820s-30s has probably been removed by later 19th and 20th-century developments. It is highly unlikely that intact evidence still remains in the archaeological record because of building works prior to 1893 and the DFS development works in the late 1980s. The item does not meet this criterion

The place possesses uncommon, rare or endangered aspects of the cultural or natural history of New South Wales.

147 George Street is relatively unusual at a local level, for the use of an arch as such a dominant feature of its façade. It is also unusual for the 1980s intervention, significantly modifying the ground and first floor levels, not only physically but also in its use, perhaps as a "bold" approach reflective of its time. As the ground floor had been previously degraded with vehicular access, there was a rationale for using this narrower section of the block as a main entry point for the whole DFS development, thus enabling the ongoing commercial use of the whole block. The item meets this criterion at a local level

The place is important in demonstrating the principal characteristics of a class of cultural or natural places/environments in New South Wales.

The shops and shopping district of The Rocks are representative of the continued commercial use of the area, and the change to tourism. 147 George Street is one of a group of shop buildings that operated in The Rocks from the end of the 19th century until the late 20th century. 146 George Street is a representative example of this group. This item meets this criterion at a local level.

== See also ==
- Australian non-residential architectural styles
