= Merchant's House, Sydney =

Historic site in Sydney, New South Wales

Merchant's House
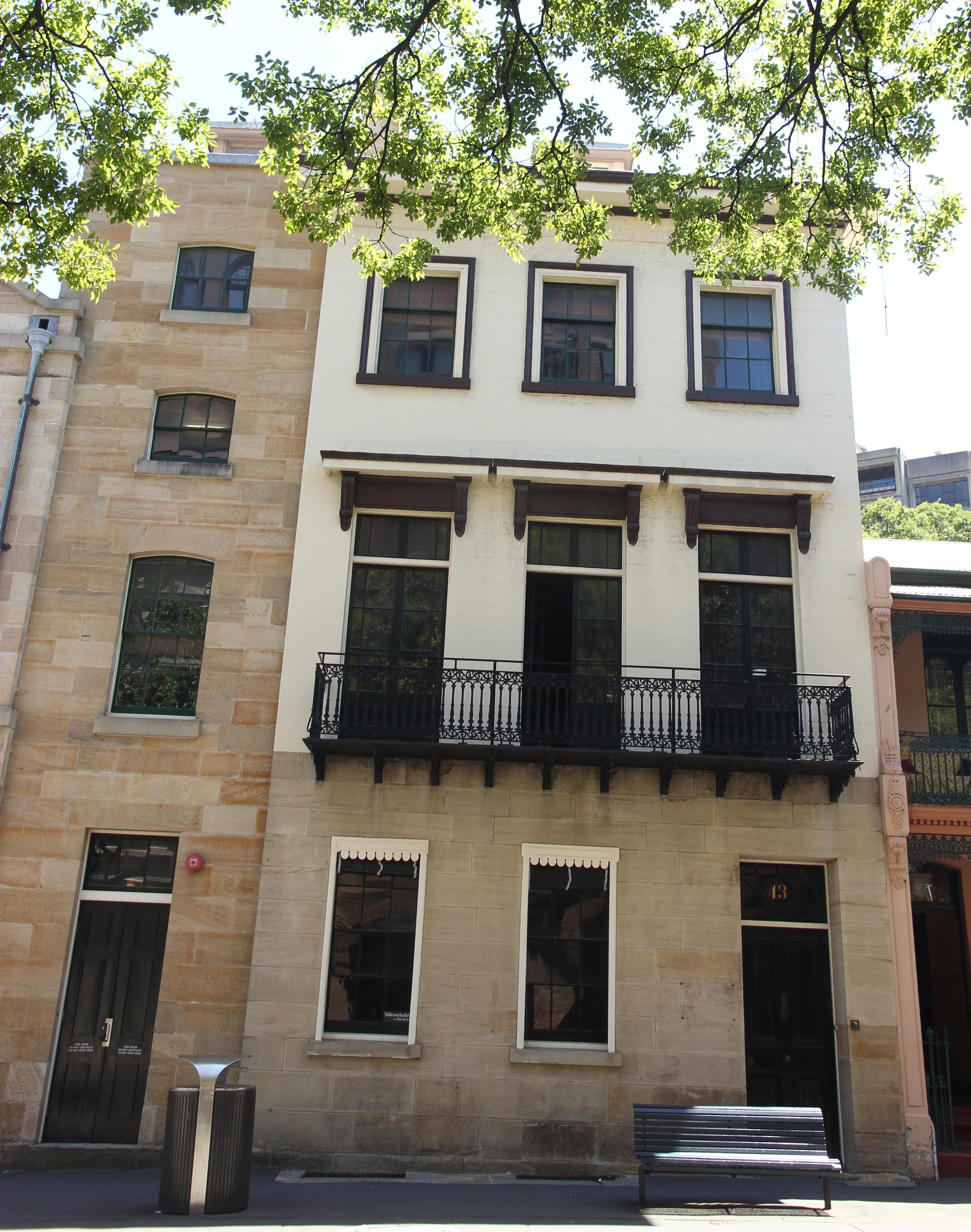
- Merchant's House, pictured in 2019. The narrow building on the left of the image is 45 George Street; with 43 George Street at right of image.

- Location within Sydney Location within Australia
- 33.8577°S 151.2086°E
- Location: 43–45 George Street, The Rocks, City of Sydney, New South Wales, Australia

History
- Built: 1848

Site notes
- Architect: John Bibb^{a}
- Owner: Property NSW

New South Wales Heritage Register
- Official name: Merchants House; Counting House (former); (Merchant's)
- Type: State heritage (built)
- Designated: 10 May 2002
- Reference no.: 1561
- Type: House
- Category: Residential buildings (private)

Merchant's House is a heritage-listed education centre and offices at 43–45 George Street in the inner city Sydney suburb of The Rocks in the City of Sydney local government area of New South Wales, Australia. Its design is attributed to John Bibb^{a} and was built during 1848. It is also known as Counting House (former) and Merchant's. The building formerly served as a residence, museum, offices and boarding house. The property is owned by Property NSW, an agency of the Government of New South Wales. It was added to the New South Wales State Heritage Register on 10 May 2002.

== History ==
The first buildings in the vicinity were the hospital and the houses of the surgeons. The hospital was immediately to the south of the Merchant's House. By 1802 Nicholas Bayly built a substantial house with a distinctive mansard roof for himself on the eastern side of High Street more or less in front of the site. This was followed shortly by the house of Robert Campbell, also on the eastern side of the road.

The first documented occupation of the site of the Merchant's House following European arrival was the leasing of the land by Captain Waterhouse. His lease, shown on Grimes' map of 1800, occupies both sides of the alignment of the High Street. Waterhouse was a naval captain, having served on the First Fleet ship Sirius as midshipman. He returned to England and took part in naval actions but was encouraged to return to the colony, importing the first merino sheep. His grants included land at Liberty Plains and Parramatta, and leases within Sydney at The Rocks and Garden Island. He returned to England for the last time in 1800. No permanent structures can be seen in paintings or drawings that show his land.

Robert Campbell arrived in Sydney in 1798 from India where he worked as a merchant and trader in a family business. His arrival and enthusiasm to become established as a resident trader gave him strong support from Governor Hunter. Buying land at Dawes Point, he began to erect warehouses, wharves and a home for himself, and began to develop importing lines that were still the only source of some essential supplies. To provide for paying return cargoes, he encouraged the sealing industry. He also took over Captain Waterhouse's leases, eventually converting them into freehold granted land, which resulted in him controlling a substantial part of Dawes Point, with Campbell's Cove becoming part of the named harbour landscape. The focus of Campbell's activities was on the water's edge, with facilities for ships and warehousing. The landscape of the peninsula included a substantial brick wall that surrounded his land from George Street to Gloucester Street. The land within it appears to have been cleared but remained the original rocky slope.

Detailed maps of 1822, 1831 and 1836 do not show any structures on the land, but by 1843 the effects of subdivision by Campbell are shown with houses dotting the periphery of his land. The Merchant's House land was granted to Robert Campbell on 16 October 1834, following a long period as Campbell's lease. By this time Campbell had expanded his business greatly, starting grazing stock in the Monaro and Western Plains. He was also an original shareholder of the Bank of New South Wales. Campbell is remembered positively by history, with a reputation for fairness in trade and not using his power as one of the major merchants to unduly influence the political landscape. Campbell died in 1846.

The early 1840s were an economic depression in NSW, resulting from the gradual cessation of transportation and consequent rise in labour costs, severe repeated droughts and especially the pain of transforming from a state-subsidised to a mercantile economy. Although Campbell is recorded as having weathered the depression better than most of the bigger traders, he still chose to subdivide his land. While Campbell owned the area back from Campbell's Cove, its use and ultimate value were restricted to a narrow maritime trading function. Selective subdivision allowed him to raise capital without compromising the way his trading base operated. In 1841 he subdivided and placed for sale blocks of land bounded by George Street, Atherton Place and Gloucester Street. One allotment, No. 4, was conveyed to John Martyn and James Combes for £825 in June 1841. This was the southeastern corner block of Campbell's land and located on the northern corner of George Street and a small lane, initially called Union Lane. Martyn and Combes erected a three-storey building on the corner, with a matching partner for it being erected at about the same time on the opposite corner of the lane. The north corner building of George Street and Atherton Place became No. 47 George Street. The matched buildings were designed by John Bibb.

Martyn and Combes operated as plumbers, painters and glaziers in a building only 500 metres (1,600 ft) down George Street on the corner of Jamison Street, but clearly had enough capital to invest in a substantial construction. Several years later, after Campbell's death in 1846, his son George sold the neighbouring allotment No. 5 to Martyn and Combes as well, for the sum of £300. Allotment 5 became Nos. 43-45 George Street, although different numbering was used during the later 19th century.

Martyn and Combes erected the Merchant's House by September 1848. They were described as 'newly erected stone built premises, situate in George-street North, opposite Messrs. Campbell's, consisting of a commodious dwelling house and spacious stores, replete with every convenience'. It was noted as having stone walls, three floors, a slate roof and a 33-foot (10 m) frontage onto George Street.

Both No. 47 and Nos. 43–45 had been built with the intention of being leased or let to other users. Sydney Cove became busier during the 1840s as the success of the wool industry brought wealth, trade goods and encouraged immigration. Investing in the infrastructure of trade may have been a gamble in 1841 but would have been proven a safe bet seven years later. The first known occupants of 43–45 were Lawrence and Steven Spyers, operating as merchants and commission agents, occupying both the house and the store in 1850. Two years later the residence was occupied by Archibald Walker, a merchant, and Martyn and Combes occupied the store.

Martyn occupied the residence from 1859 until his death in 1864, and the store by Martyn and Combes. The two buildings Nos. 43–45 and No. 47 appear to have been treated as a single entity by Martyn and Combes as is shown in detailed plans which begin to appear in this period. The death of John Martyn signals the start of a rapid turnover of tenants and occupants. After John Martyn's death, his son William ran the business in the store, but the residence was occupied by William Rielly in 1865–1867.

The Merchant's House itself was suitable as a residence for respectable business men. The succession of soap manufacturer and manufacturing chemist suggests that the place with the adjoining store was also suited for that type of light industry, even though it did not directly reflect The Rocks' maritime or mercantile character, unlike the wool brokers and merchants who needed to be near the port. That these presumably aromatic trades could be carried out next to residences suggests that the expectations of tenants were not too high.

Edward Row and Co. initially occupied No. 47, and then expanded into No. 45 in 1876, and by 1882 they had also taken over the residence. Row is listed as a wholesaling and manufacturing chemist. Little is known of the firm Edward Row apart from their products. Their earlier offices mentioned in advertisements are in King Street and Bank Court, Sydney, and the proprietors were John and Edward Row. One advertisement quotes them as being established in 1820. As a wholesaling and manufacturing chemist it is likely that Row produced their own and on-sold other manufacturers' products, possibly taking in bulk volumes and packaging it for the colonial market.

Row's Embrocation was probably their major product, judging by its appearance as a large lettered sign on the northern face of No. 43 in the later 19th century. It was a dressing for cuts and abrasions to animals, but humans also used it. They are recorded as having bought the patent for Josephson's Australian Ointment in about 1870 and continued producing it under its original name. They are also advertised as manufacturers of cordial, soap powder and vinegar as well as pharmaceuticals.

As manufacturing and importing chemists Row and Co. can be expected to have bought chemical supplies in bulk and possibly already packaged for sale through pharmacists and agricultural suppliers. They would probably have repackaged bulk materials into containers for sale, and are likely to have conducted their own manufacturing on the site. This would have therefore required storage for bulk imported chemicals, for the packaging into which it would have been then distributed, an assortment of machinery for their own production, including mixers, blenders and pill machines. These could have been hand operated or connected to a small steam engine that would have provided sufficient motive power.

Edward Row and co occupied the property until 1921, at which point they shared with another occupant for three years, and ceased occupation in 1924 after a total tenancy of 48 years. During these last few years electrical engineer Cecil Row, probably related to the Edward Row family, also occupied the residence.

A box manufacturing company, Lawley and Co. occupied the store in 1925.

In 1902 the buildings were resumed by The Rocks Resumption Board. Lots 4 and 5 were sold to the board for £4,420/3/9. The board had been established to acquire privately owned property in The Rocks for redevelopment, because the 1900 bubonic plague outbreak had proven to some that the old and poorly planned residential area provided a ready reception for disease-bearing rats from the equally old and poorly planned wharf facilities. While this was partially true, the inadequacies of the existing port facilities were recognised and plans were drawn up for a modern port, which required the Government's acquisition and consolidation of land several blocks from the waterfront. While many houses within The Rocks were demolished, the use of the Merchant's House for manufacturing, business and residential occupation continued relatively unaffected.

The Sydney Harbour Trust (SHT) gained control of the property from The Rocks Resumption Board in 1927. This was part of a continuing process of acquisition of properties within The Rocks and Millers Point that had begun when the SHT was established in 1900. Although its main purpose was not to manage properties it took on this role because of a lack of strategic direction following World War I.

The first boarding house lease was issued to Mary Grady (or O'Grady) for the combined Nos. 43–45 in 1928. Some modifications were required to permit the new form of use, and these are probably the reason for partitioning, and access being pushed through between the residence and store at each level. A bathroom was added on Level 1 at the stair landing.

Further modifications are recorded in 1934, including a new kitchen and improvements in water supply and toilet, as well as further improvements in access between the two buildings.

Mary Grady's granddaughter Joan Cubis was interviewed in the house in 1993 before the most recent conservation works took place. Joan lived with her grandmother in the house from 1928. Her grandmother had moved from Fort Street because of construction of the Harbour Bridge. Mary Grady was replaced as lessee by Haigh Zlotkowtski in 1935 who remained until 1941. The access points from No. 45 to No. 47, which had been closed off, presumably when the SHT took over, were re-opened.

It is also known that the Indian Navy used the premises for accommodation during 1941–1942 and possibly after. Searches of Australian Archives have not found relevant files relating to this but these may appear in the future. The Indian sailors were billeted while the corvettes they were to sail home were readied.

From 1943 Alice Auguston commenced another boarding house lease. Modifications included gas supplies to kitchen areas and enclosing some of the rear openings in No. 45. The Auguston family retained the lease until 1985.

Information about the building in the period from the end of World War II to the end of last century is sparse. The Auguston family continued to hold the lease. The Maritime Services Board (successor to the Sydney Harbour Trust) remained in ownership until the mid-1980s, when the property was transferred to the Sydney Cove Authority. The Merchant's House and its adjoining buildings were considered to be important parts of the historic fabric that would be conserved in the process of developing new office precincts. As is well known, a combination of green bans and political reality prevented particular schemes from proceeding as originally planned. The result was that Nos. 43–45 were retained, eventually coming into the ownership of the Sydney Cove Authority, later the Sydney Harbour Foreshore Authority (SHFA).

The building on the southern side of the lane, corner George Street, that matched Martyn and Combes' building at No. 47, was demolished in the 1920s and replaced by another larger building, now known as the Old Sydney Holiday Inn, built in 1923–26. This larger building reflected a 20th-century scale of construction that demarcated it from 19th-century low-rise commercial architecture in The Rocks.

The building that was situated in the rear yard of Nos. 43–45 and built c. 1882, fronting Atherden Place was occupied by Bushells in the mid-1930s. Their main office and coffee roasting operation was in Harrington Street. It was later used as a store by Howard O'Farrells, an import-export firm located on Cumberland Street, until its demolition in the 1980s.

From 1985 Merchant's House has been used for a number of different purposes. In c. 1995 the Westpac Museum of banking was extended to occupy the area behind Nos. 43-45 which covers the footprint of the c. 1882 shed. No records have been found of what was removed by the works, and it is assumed that all earlier archaeological evidence has been destroyed.

From 1991 to 1994 SHFA undertook a comprehensive program of internal and external conservation works to Merchant's House. This included some archaeological monitoring work inside and in front of the building. The archaeologist, Jane Lydon, reported that as the structure had been cut into bedrock it had limited archaeological potential, and so she examined built up debris that had accumulated in the basement area. This revealed that the basement floor may originally have been timbered, as the deposit of bitumen, dark brown fill and recent dumping sat over natural excavated bedrock. Josephsons Australian Ointment and Rows Embrocation bottles were found in the fill of the footing trench in the south wall of the room, confirming that these openings had been added during the period of their occupation.

Material from sub-floor deposits in the attic level of the residence is most likely associated with the occupancy by Thomas Gainsford, the Minister of the Mariner's Church or Charles Smith, listed in different Sands Directories as both an accountant and confectioner.

The place was generally conserved to its c.1840s form with some lesser rooms being restored to their c.1940s state. Work proceeded on the understanding that the place would be handed over to the National Trust at a peppercorn rental, in return for ongoing management as a museum. Several conserved spaces, including the first floor parlour, basement kitchen and several attic rooms were presented in a house museum context. In 1994 Charles, Prince of Wales, opened the National Trust Toy Museum comprising the James Hardie Toy Collection.

The toy museum closed in about 1995, and the National Trust vacated the place. The building remained vacant until 1999. The SHFA Education Unit then occupied Merchant's House and operated its "Children Stepping Back in Time" program. From 2000 SHFA's Sydney Learning Adventures program has operated out of the place and use it for interpretation of historical education programs.

== Description ==
1848 merchant's town house and office.

The Merchants House consists of five levels including basement kitchen, ground floor dining room, first floor drawing room, bedrooms and servants quarters. The planning is typical of a late Georgian period townhouse with kitchen, scullery, and cellars in the basement; ground floor dining room, parlour, and entrance hall; first floor drawing room with french doors onto a cantilevered balcony, and bedrooms on the upper two floors. The style is Greek Revival. Typical details include the water leafs motifs on the stone brackets supporting the first floor window cornices, front door fanlight, heavy cornice, stone architrave mouldings to the upper windows, the fine timber geometric staircase and other interior details.

Style: Greek Revival; Storeys: 3 plus basement & attic; Side Rear Walls: Stone; Roof Cladding: Galvanised steel; Floor Frame: Timber; Ceilings: Lath and plaster

=== Condition ===
As at 3 May 2001, Archaeology Assessment Condition: Partly disturbed. Good underfloor deposits preserved in situ. Assessment Basis: Cellars. Floors level with George Street. Stone quarried out at rear in 1840s. Floorboards were lifted during final stages of conservation on the building and it was noted that the under floor deposits were fairly substantial. These have been retained for future investigation. Investigation: Watching Brief.

Extremely intact fabric generally, with evidence of partitions from the boarding house period.

Archaeology partly disturbed. Good interfloor deposits preserved in situ.

=== Modifications and dates ===
A timber addition on the rear of 43 George Street is shown on a c. 1880's map. By the late 1880s the rear yard area of 43–47 George Street had been enclosed by a wooden and corrugated iron structure. This space probably formed part of Row's manufacturing establishment. It is possible that the timber rear addition over the area to 43 George Street was demolished between 1902 and 1927 after the buildings were resumed. The pressed metal ceilings on the ground floor and the repairs to the chimney pieces also date from this period. Further renovations were made in 1928 and in 1934.

During the building's conservation and adaptation as a house museum in 1993, the need for fire upgrade necessitated the conversion of the store at 45 George Street to a fire stair to serve both 47 and 43 George Street. A new roof element was introduced to house a smoke exhaust above the stairwell.

== Heritage listing ==
As at 30 March 2011, the Merchant's House and site are of State heritage significance for their historical and scientific cultural values. The site and building are also of State heritage significance for their contribution to The Rocks area which is of State Heritage significance in its own right.

The Merchant's House is the most intact example of the typical late Georgian period townhouse (with basement offices, ground floor dining room, first floor drawing room and upper bedrooms) known to survive in NSW. Built in 1848, documentary evidence suggest that it was designed by John Bibb, considered one of the finest Greek Revival architects in Australia. It contains a rare example in Sydney of an intact mid nineteenth century first floor drawing room with its moulded plasterwork, chimney piece and grate, joinery, and cantilevered balcony.

The Merchant's House contains original elements of high quality including a geometric staircase, cast-iron cantilevered balcony, stonework, surface finishes, door cases, windows, French doors, dormer windows and servant bell system. The house was designed to complement the adjoining warehouse built four years earlier. Within the present streetscape of George Street North, the buildings contribute to a fine ensemble of buildings from the early Victorian to Edwardian period. Including a range of residential terraces from the early 1840s (85–77 George Street), to the 1860s (32–29 George Street), and the 1880s (41–33 George Street).

The building complex reflects the wealth and status of the small business and merchant class of 19th century Sydney and provides evidence of the once dominant mercantile nature of The Rocks. It is an extremely valuable resource for understanding life in the area, especially if examined along with Gannon House in Argyle Street and Susannah Place in Gloucester Street which represent contrasting socio-economic backgrounds.

Merchant's House was listed on the New South Wales State Heritage Register on 10 May 2002 having satisfied the following criteria.

The place is important in demonstrating the course, or pattern, of cultural or natural history in New South Wales.

The granting of the land to Captain Henry Waterhouse and later to Robert Campbell were representative of the way that land was used to both reward and encourage the work of important individuals in the colony. The subdivision of Campbell's land, and construction of a building by Martyn and Combes combining a gentleman's townhouse residence and warehouse or store reflects the character of The Rocks, where merchants lived in or near the commercial district. The Rocks included many substantial terraces and large villas that can be seen in mid 19th century illustrations. The Rocks relied on the maritime trade and industries concentrated along the foreshore for its wealth. The subject town house fits firmly within this social mix, and also with the close association of residence with work, as a sign of the mercantile middle class. It also was speculative building on the part of Martyn and Combes, tied physically to their earlier buildings on either side of Union Street, reminding us that it was built during the 1840s when the colonial economy was undergoing a dramatic bust-boom cycle as it transformed from a convict-based to a capitalist economy. It has been found that few, if any other such examples can still reflect the particular historical associations and activities as Merchant's House and store.

The changing occupancy of the buildings charts a process that affected all of The Rocks and other parts of Sydney. The construction by Martyn and Combes and their initial occupation of the building can suggest either that this had been their plan all along or that they were having trouble finding occupants for their speculative investment. The residence began to be occupied by precisely the intended market - respectable men who had a need to live in The Rocks, notably Thomas Gainsford of the Mariners Church. The use of the store eventually settled into occupation by a soap manufacturer and then the long-term occupancy by Edward Row and Company, chemical manufacturers. Through the later 19th century Row and Co. occupied the store, adjoining building and residence, reflecting less the maritime character of The Rocks and more a light manufacturing industrial suburb which happened to be fringed by docks and warehouses. This was characteristic of Sydney's working harbour in the 19th century.

The early 20th century saw the bubonic plague and subsequent attempts to turn The Rocks into a modern industrial complex. The development along the foreshore by the Sydney Harbour Trust and the resumption of the property show that the government felt that official intervention was needed to both solve the perceived social and medical problems posed by The Rocks, and the commercial necessities for completely redeveloped port facilities. The place is a tangible survivor of the purge of building stock associated with the c. 1900 plague and its consequential rebuilding activity.

The house became used as a boarding house, as did many places within The Rocks, Millers Point, and elsewhere in Sydney town. The Rocks community included many seafarers and people who had been dispossessed from their own homes by resumptions and the boarding house culture developed, although it had been present from early in The Rocks' and Sydney town history. A brief interlude with associated adaptation work to the house during World War II between 1941 and 1942, saw Indian Navy personnel billeted in the building, while assisting on the construction of corvettes - and then the boarding house role continued. The most recent chapter of the building's history began with the creation of the Sydney Cove Redevelopment Authority. Recognised as one of the genuinely historic buildings within SCRA's control, it was probably never under threat in the same way that other parts of The Rocks were. From 1985, after it finally ceased to be a boarding house, it became a heritage property with all of the difficulties of finding viable uses and making acceptable intervention in fabric that this entails.

The place has a strong or special association with a person, or group of persons, of importance of cultural or natural history of New South Wales's history.

Merchant's House is associated with Martyn and Combes, who were responsible for the erection of the place, and were well known nineteenth century Sydney plumbers, painters, glaziers and merchants. The business operated in Sydney for 30 years. The success of the firm in the early to mid 1840s is witnessed by the capital investment in the buildings built between 43 and 49 (now demolished) George Street. The firm of Edward Row & Co. – wholesale and manufacturing chemists, were long term tenants of Merchant's House. The business had occupied the premises at 47 George Street from 1875, which was used as a laboratory; their retail outlet being 219 Pitt Street. The company was well known for its medication 'Row's Embrocation' or "Farmers Friend".

The place is important in demonstrating aesthetic characteristics and/or a high degree of creative or technical achievement in New South Wales.

The design, configuration, detail and materials of Merchant's House and its store are excellent examples of the Greek Revival style in New South Wales. The facade displays typical yet fine Greek Revival details including water leaf motifs on the stone brackets supporting the first floor window cornices, front door fanlight, heavy cornice, stone architrave and mouldings to the upper windows. The interior has a fine timber geometric staircase, polished Cedar joinery, Australian sienna marble chimney piece in the drawing room and other original interior details. The layout of Merchant's House is a representative, yet now rare, exemplar of the late Georgian/early Victorian period townhouse which included kitchen, scullery and cellars in the basement; entrance hall, dining room and parlour on the ground floor; drawing room on the first floor with French doors onto a balcony; and bedrooms on the upper two floors. With its adjoining working store (now adapted) it is an excellent example of a townhouse with associated store from the 1840s. As a late Georgian/early Victorian period townhouse design, Merchant's House is unique in Sydney and probably throughout New South Wales for displaying the design qualities of that type. Due to its location in George Street, Merchant's House makes a valuable contribution to the evolution and streetscape of The Rocks.

The place has a strong or special association with a particular community or cultural group in New South Wales for social, cultural or spiritual reasons.

Merchant's House is of particular interest to heritage aficionados and heritage organizations in general including the National Trust of Australia and associated groups for its rarity as an architectural type, design, and level of intactness.

The place has potential to yield information that will contribute to an understanding of the cultural or natural history of New South Wales.

Merchant's House is a reference building for a Merchant's' residence and adjacent store of the early Victorian period in Sydney. The overall design, layout and materials, rarity, well proportioned and detailed George Street elevation, staircase and chimneypieces, and intact drawing room provide information related to the development of the Greek Revival style and working Merchant's townhouse and store in New South Wales, and interpretation of the London townhouse in Sydney. The archaeological evidence surviving within and in front of the building has been previously investigated during conservation and adaptation work. It has improved our understanding of the development of the site, and the lives of its residents. Little evidence is expected to remain due to the impacts of previous work, however any possible remaining resource is of archaeological significance and meets this criterion for its ability to further inform conservation decisions and illustrate historical use.

The place possesses uncommon, rare or endangered aspects of the cultural or natural history of New South Wales.

Merchant's House is the most intact example of a late Georgian/early Victorian period townhouse known to survive in Sydney, and probably New South Wales. Merchant's House is a rare example of early Victorian period Merchant's' residence with attached adjacent store in Sydney, and probably New South Wales. No. 43 George Street contains a rare example in Sydney of an intact mid 19th century first floor townhouse drawing room complete with its original fabric including moulded plasterwork, chimneypiece and grate, joinery, French doors and balcony. No. 43 George Street contains a number of rare and excellently detailed elements including a timber geometric stair and cast iron cantilevered balcony.

The place is important in demonstrating the principal characteristics of a class of cultural or natural places/environments in New South Wales.

Merchant's House forms part of a group of mid 19th century to early 20th century buildings in George Street North which demonstrate the pattern, development and evolution of The Rocks, a tourist destination for Australia. No. 43 George Street is now a rare representative and outstanding example of a late Georgian/early Victorian period townhouse with its store, designed in the Greek Revival style in Sydney. The place is held in high esteem by groups interested in recognizing such important values to the community e.g. the National Trust of Australia, and likely to be so to more members of the broader community once promoted.

== See also ==
- Australian residential architectural styles
- Harrington's Buildings
- Sergeant Major's Row, 33-41 George Street
- Union Bond Store, 47 George Street

== Notes ==
^a Evidence is unproved.
