= Merchant's House =

Merchant's House may refer to one of several heritage buildings:

- Merchant's House, Shepton Mallet, in England
- Merchant's House, Sydney, in Australia
- Merchant's House Museum, in New York City
