= Sergeant Major's Row =

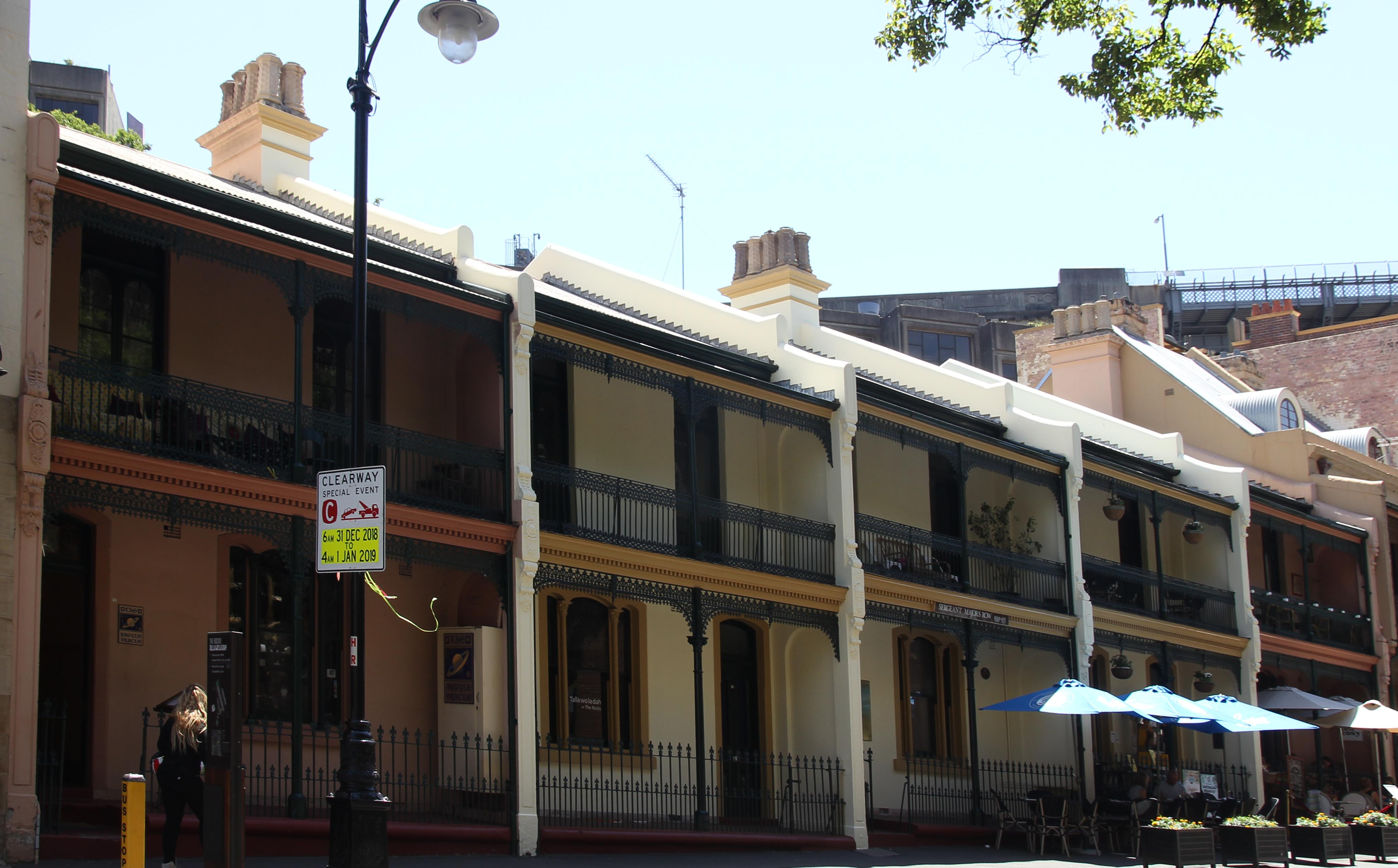
- The row of terrace houses, now converted in shops and offices, pictured in 2019

- Location within Sydney Location within Australia
- 33.8575°S 151.2085°E
- Location: 33–41 George Street, The Rocks, City of Sydney, New South Wales, Australia

History
- Built: 1881; 145 years ago

Site notes
- Architectural style: Victorian Filigree
- Owner: Property NSW

New South Wales Heritage Register
- Official name: Sergeant Majors Row (terrace); Major's; Sergeant Major's Row
- Type: State heritage (built)
- Designated: 10 May 2002
- Reference no.: 1579
- Type: Terrace
- Category: Residential buildings (private)

The Sergeant Major's Row are heritage-listed former terrace houses and now shops and offices. They are located in a row at 33–41 George Street in the inner city Sydney suburb of The Rocks in the City of Sydney local government area of New South Wales, Australia. The row was built in 1881. It is also known as Sergeant Majors Row (terrace) and Major's. The property is owned by Property NSW, an agency of the Government of New South Wales. It was added to the New South Wales State Heritage Register on 10 May 2002.

== History ==
This property is part of the land originally granted to Robert Campbell senior by Crown grant under the hand of Sir Richard Bourke, formerly Governor of the Colony in 1834. Robert Campbell's will gave to each of his sons and daughters one sixth of his property.

In 1848, a Deed of Partition was registered giving Arthur Jeffreys (Campbell's son-in-law) and George Campbell the task of selling parcels of property. In 1851, Jeffreys conveyed the allotments 1, 2, and 3 of Campbell's subdivision to Thomas Fisher. Two years later, Fisher without investing capital into the property, conveyed the site to Alfred Mitchell who in 1855 sold the land to Francis Mitchell. In 1878 the property still remained undeveloped. On 25 September 1878, Mitchell transferred the land to Edward Stanley Ebsworth.

Ebsworth commenced erection of five houses to this site in c. 1880 and by December 1881 the Sydney Council noted that five houses were built upon the property. In 1881, the two story, seven roomed dwellings were described as being constructed of brick walls with roofs clad in "iron". In 1882, tenants were Joseph O'Connor, Frank Cook and Mary Ann Kendall. The remaining houses were empty. Ebsworth mortgaged the property to the Australian Mutual Provident Society in 1884. In September 1888 the mortgage was discharged and Ebsworth conveyed the dwellings to the Sydney Real Estate Bank Limited (SREB). In April the following year the SREB mortgaged the five dwellings to Charles Edward Pitcher and Edward Lewin Samuel. In 1892, Pitcher and Samuel transferred the mortgage to the Perpetual Trustee Company Ltd.

In December 1900 the Observatory Hill Resumption Act was gazetted and the Perpetual Trustee Company Ltd. released the property to the King and the Minister for Public Works in May 1903. In 1910 the Central City Mission used No. 41 George Street.

From 1969 No. 35 was occupied by Nita McRae, one of the founders of the Rocks Residents' Group and Green Bans activist. Much of the background work to coordinate the residents' action to save The Rocks community took place in this house. A plaque was placed in her memory in 1996.

Tenders were called in the early 1980s for the lease of the buildings for their current use of shops and offices. In June 1982 the Sydney Cove Redevelopment Authority (SCRA) issued an invitation to tender for lease and establishment of a medical centre at No. 37-39 George Street.

It is assumed that the buildings were subsequently leased for medical purposes as at the end of 1985, consideration was being given to the "contraction of the medical practices at the above address [37 and 39 George Street], into 37 George Street". Openings which had been made in the shared party wall were infilled and the buildings were again separately leased. A Doctors Surgery continues to occupy the ground floor of No. 37 George Street. A separate office operates from the upper floor. The other buildings are currently occupied by various commercial and retail tenants.

The name of the buildings, 'Sergeant Major's Row', appears to have been adopted by SCRA as a reminder for an early term for George Street, though this related more specifically the northern end of the street. In the early 1800s it was also known as "High Street", becoming "George Street" in 1810 after the then reigning monarch, King George III.

Archaeology notes: Lease to Robert Campbell by 1807. Granted to Robert Campbell, 16 October 1834.

The name given the buildings by SCRA is a reminder of an early term for George Street which was begun as a track for water carriers carrying water from the Tank Stream to the marine encampment and the hospital - its original name was Spring Row. Then it was humorously altered unofficially to Sergeant-Major's Row, then officially to High Street by Governor King and finally to George Street by Governor Macquarie.

== Description ==
Two storey terraced housing. Built By: 1880s.

The row comprises a group of seven two-storeyed late Victorian terrace houses. Nos. 29-31 were built of stone and reflect the "standard" terrace type pattern commonly found in Darlinghurst and Paddington, with single span iron lace balcony, arched openings to ground floor and squared lintels to first floor. Half round dormer windows to attics give an added picturesque form. Nos. 33-41 were built of stuccoed brick and are of a larger, more decorative terrace type pattern, having wide balconies supported by centre cast iron columns, iron valences and balustrade.

Style: Victorian Filigree; Storeys: Two; Facade: Stone and Brick; Roof Cladding: Galvanised Iron; Floor Frame: Timber.

=== Condition ===
As at 3 May 2001, Archaeology Assessment Condition: Partly disturbed. Assessment Basis: Floors level with George Street. Stone quarried out at rear.

=== Modifications and dates ===
- Late 1960s: All terraces were renovated for continued use as residences.
- Early 1980s: The terraces were leased for their current use of shops and offices.

== Heritage listing ==
As at 26 June 2002, Sergeant Major's Row, a grouping of five terrace buildings located at 33-41 George Street and site is of State heritage significance for its historical, aesthetic and scientific values. The site and buildings are also of State heritage significance for their contribution to The Rocks area, which is of State heritage significance in its own right.

Originally constructed as a speculative type development, the terraces have been occupied by a number of occupants and tenants as residences and later as commercial premises which generally reflects the growth and development of The Rocks. They are significant for their association with Robert Campbell, Edward Stanley Ebsworth and Nita McCrae who all had significant impact in the local area.

The buildings are good and intact examples of late Victorian terraces that despite ongoing upgrades and some modification significantly retain their fundamental external form and characteristics, scale and details, internal spatial arrangement and a considerable amount of original and early fabric. They make an important contribution to the streetscape at the northern end of George Street as an intact grouping and representing the more human scale, early residences of The Rocks. The site and buildings provide accessible interpretation opportunities for the general public and tourists in the heart of The Rocks.

Sergeant Major's Row was listed on the New South Wales State Heritage Register on 10 May 2002 having satisfied the following criteria.

The place is important in demonstrating the course, or pattern, of cultural or natural history in New South Wales.

The terraces are historically significant as they are representative the late nineteenth century development in The Rocks. Constructed in 1881 as residences by a local merchant, Edward Stanley Ebsworth, they were intermittently used as boarding houses and then commercial, retail and office spaces from the late 1970s which is reflective of a shift and changing nature, growth and development of the area.

The place has a strong or special association with a person, or group of persons, of importance of cultural or natural history of New South Wales's history.

Sergeant Major's Row is significant for its associations with Robert Campbell, to whom the land was first granted, with Walter Stanley Ebsworth, a prominent merchant and industrialist, and with Nita McRae, a founder of The Rocks Residents' Group and a Green Bans activist.

The place is important in demonstrating aesthetic characteristics and/or a high degree of creative or technical achievement in New South Wales.

The Row is a group of seven terraces in Victorian Filigree style which are very good examples of their type. They make an important contribution to the streetscape at the northern end of George Street. They relate well in scale and style to the pair of 1850s stone terraces at 29-31 George Street. The other buildings in the vicinity which were built early this century as part of The Rocks reconstruction by the Sydney Harbour Trust are larger in scale but sympathetic in materials and style and together with the terraces form a strong visual precinct.

The place has a strong or special association with a particular community or cultural group in New South Wales for social, cultural or spiritual reasons.

The terraces have generally been occupied by a number of other individuals since construction and businesses from the late 1970s. The terraces have some association with The Rocks Residents' Group and Green Bans group through Nita McCrae who occupied No. 35 George Street during the 1970s. No. 39 was also occupied by the Nature Conservation Council during the 1980s. 37 & 39 also provided medical services to The Rocks community during this period. A Doctors' practice remains at No. 37.

The place has potential to yield information that will contribute to an understanding of the cultural or natural history of New South Wales.

The terraces clearly demonstrate and retain planning of a late Victorian residence and way of life of that period. The site, which retains the stone cut along its western boundary, that it would appear was quarried at some stage, emphasises and is a reminder of the early form and topography of The Rocks and modifications that were undertaken during its growth and development.

The place possesses uncommon, rare or endangered aspects of the cultural or natural history of New South Wales.

The terraces located at 33-41 George Street are good and intact representative examples of late Victorian terraces that generally retain their fundamental character and detail, however have been adapted which reflects the general shift and growth of The Rocks area.

The place is important in demonstrating the principal characteristics of a class of cultural or natural places/environments in New South Wales.

The terraces demonstrate the typical design characteristic of the "standard" terrace type that is not rare or uncommon in The Rocks or the wider context with a number of similarly scaled and styled buildings located throughout the inner suburbs of Sydney.

== See also ==
- Australian residential architectural styles
- 29-31 George Street
- Merchant's House, 43-45 George Street
