= 29–31 George Street, The Rocks =

Heritage-listed buildings in Sydney, Australia

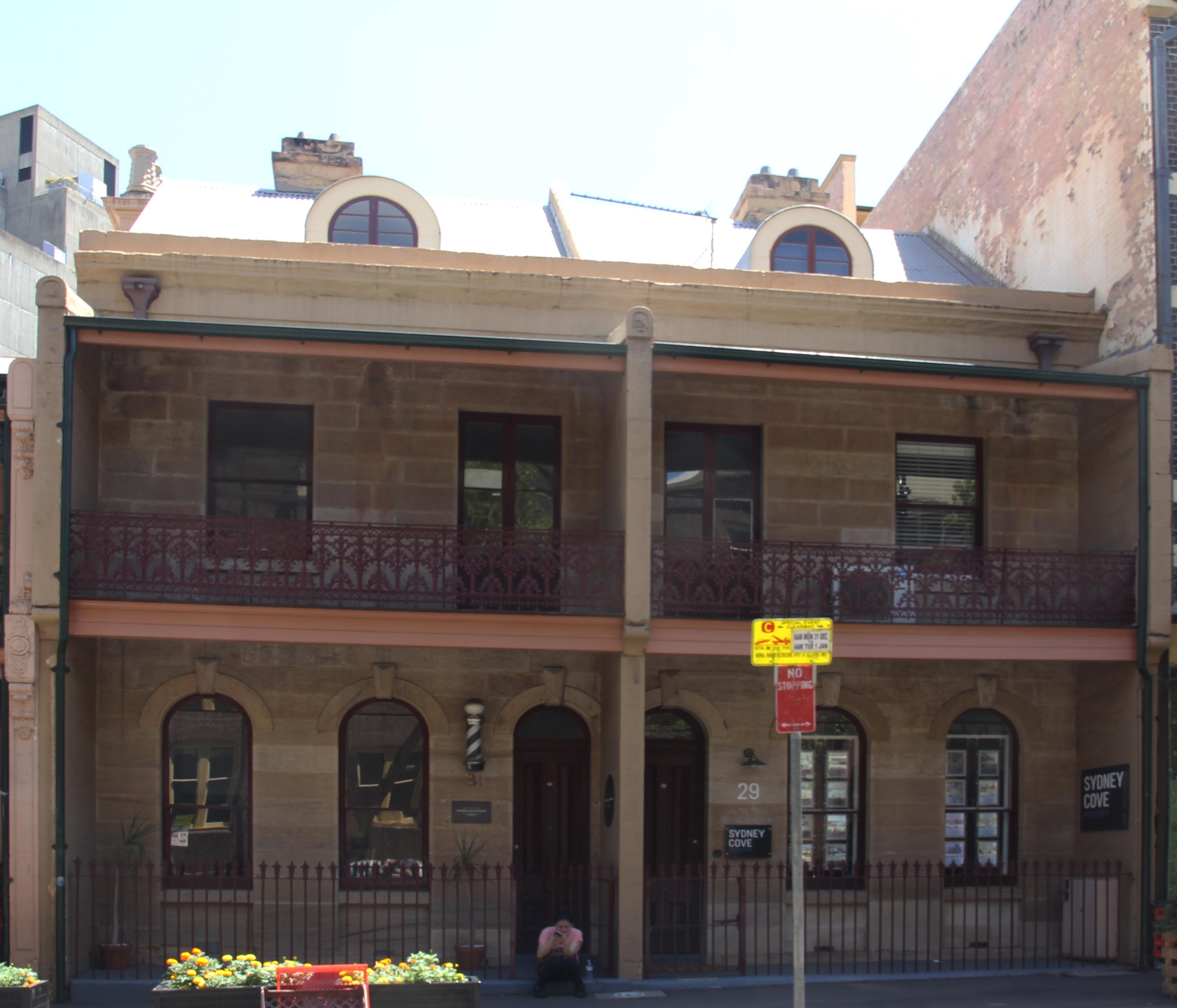
- Pictured in 2019

- Location within Sydney Location within Australia
- 33.8575°S 151.2085°E
- Location: 29–31 George Street, The Rocks, City of Sydney, New South Wales, Australia

History
- Built: 1866

Site notes
- Owner: Property NSW

New South Wales Heritage Register
- Official name: Terraces; 29–31 George Street, The Rocks
- Type: State heritage (built)
- Designated: 10 May 2002
- Reference no.: 1608
- Type: Terrace
- Category: Residential buildings (private)

29–31 George Street are two heritage-listed former terrace houses and now offices located at 29–31 George Street in the inner city Sydney suburb of The Rocks in the City of Sydney local government area of New South Wales, Australia. It was built in 1866. The property is owned by Property NSW, an agency of the Government of New South Wales. It was added to the New South Wales State Heritage Register on 10 May 2002.

== History ==
Bounded by Gloucester and George Streets, this land was granted to Robert Campbell snr. in October 1834. Campbell had leased the land from the Crown since approximately 1805.

In 1848, Robert Campbell Jnr; George Campbell (both sons of Robert Campbell, Snr) and Arthur Jeffreys (son-in-law to Robert Campbell, Snr) were given the authority to dispose of land in Robert Campbell, Snr. 's estate which was no longer required by the family. In 1851, Arthur Jeffreys conveyed Lot 4 of the Campbell sub-division to William Reilly for the sum of £120. The site was not developed until 1866 when Reilly built a pair of houses on the land, each having a frontage of 9.1 metres (30 ft). In 1867 the unoccupied houses, containing six rooms, were described as being of two storeys and attic, with stone walls (the stone possibly quarried on the site) and shingled roofs. Reilly's tenants, from 1867 to 1873, included an accountant, clergyman, and other professional gentlemen. Situated on the upper side of north George Street, the occupants of the houses enjoyed harbour views prior to the construction of the warehouses on the lower side of George Street.

In July 1873, Reilly sold the land and dwellings to Thomas Wilton Eady, a leather merchant for the sum of £1,400. It appeared that Eady erected a large shed to the rear of the allotments. From 1874 to 1887 Eady lived at 29 George Street and from here carried out his leather merchandising business. For the same period, James McCarthy a warehouseman and bootmaker, occupied No. 31.

From 1888 Eady's houses were managed as boarding houses. In 1890, the buildings were roofed in corrugated iron. In 1900 the Observatory Hill Resumption Act was gazetted and in February 1903 Eady's trustees released to the King and to the Minister for Public Works the two houses for the sum of £2,500. In 1978-9 SCRA carried out extensive restoration and renovation works at a cost of A$56,000.

Archaeological History – Lease to Robert Campbell by 1807. Granted to Robert Campbell, 16 October 1834.

== Description ==
Style: Early Victorian; Storeys: 2 plus attic; Facade: Stone; Roof Cladding: Asbestos Cement Roof shingles; Floor Frame: Timber

=== Condition ===
As at 3 May 2001, Archaeology Assessment Condition: Partly disturbed. Assessment Basis: Floors level with George Street. Stone quarried out at rear.

=== Modifications and dates ===
During 1978–79, restoration and renovation of 29–31 George Street by the Sydney Cove Redevelopment Authority occurred at a cost of $56,000. External: The bathroom and laundry were demolished. The fence and gate dividing the courtyards and the fence on the western boundary of No. 31 were demolished. Render from the bottom of 6 courses of brickwork on the southern facade of the Mercantile Hotel was also removed. The electrical cupboards, gas meters and TV antennae were removed. Two new stones were inserted in the eastern façade. Brickwork was repaired. The rear (kitchen) chimney was dismantled and rebuilt to match the existing. All rafters, battens, etc. were inspected for soundness. The roof sheeting was replaced with air conditioning shingles, and rotting or decayed timbers were replaced. Internal: All pipes and conduit were removed. All light fittings, blinds, curtains and miscellaneous nails, tacks hooks, etc. were removed from walls, ceilings and floors. Internal walls to Rooms 4, 10, 19 & 25 were demolished to ease access to adjoining rooms.

== Heritage listing ==
As at 1 April 2011, the pair of houses at 29–31 George Street is a fine example of the Victorian terrace housing associated with the merchant class in residence in The Rocks in the middle of the nineteenth century. Distinguished by the starkness of their finely finished stone work and their restrained detailing, the houses contribute to the aesthetic diversity of north George Street and the historic character of The Rocks. The site and building are also of State heritage significance for their contribution to The Rocks area which is of State Heritage significance in its own right.

Terraces was listed on the New South Wales State Heritage Register on 10 May 2002 having satisfied the following criteria.

The place is important in demonstrating the course, or pattern, of cultural or natural history in New South Wales.

This pair of fine large houses are associated with the merchant class in residence in The Rocks in the middle of the nineteenth century. The occupants, situated on the upper side of north George Street, enjoyed harbour views prior to the construction of the warehouses on the lower side of George Street.

The place is important in demonstrating aesthetic characteristics and/or a high degree of creative or technical achievement in New South Wales.

The pair of houses at 29–31 George Street are a fine example of Victorian terrace housing, distinguished by the starkness of their finely finished stone work and their restrained detailing. The houses contribute to the aesthetic diversity of north George Street and the historic character of The Rocks.

The place has a strong or special association with a particular community or cultural group in New South Wales for social, cultural or spiritual reasons.

The pair of houses at 29–31 George Street have social value for their contribution to the aesthetic diversity of north George Street and the historic character of The Rocks.

== See also ==
- Australian residential architectural styles
- Mercantile Hotel, 25–27 George Street
- Sergeant Major's Row, 33–41 George Street
