= Union Bond Store =

Union Bond Store (former)
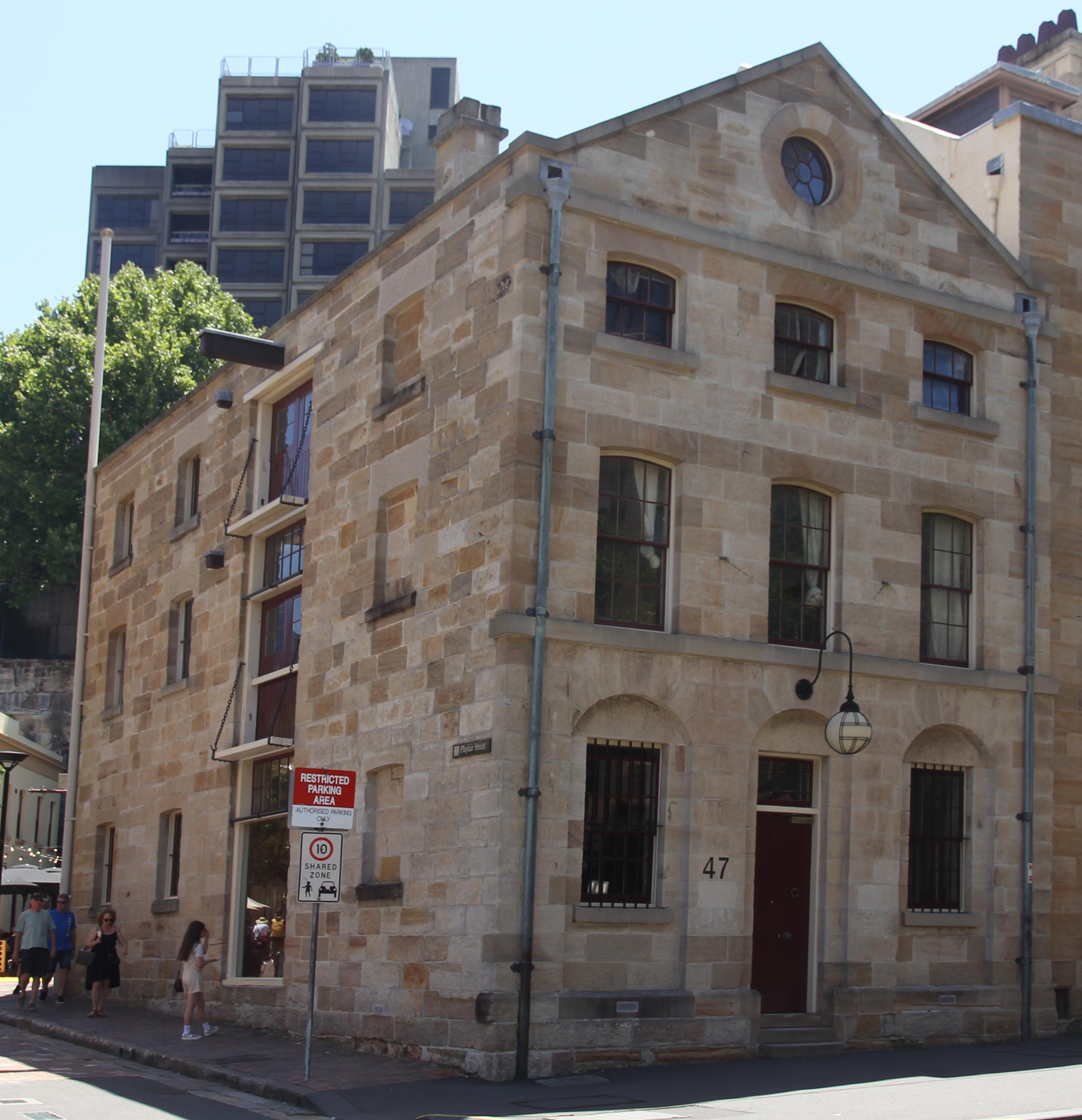
- The former Union Bond Store, pictured in 2019

- Location within Sydney Location within Australia
- 33.8577°S 151.2087°E
- Location: 47 George Street, The Rocks, City of Sydney, New South Wales, Australia

History
- Built: 1841–1842

Site notes
- Architect: John Bibb
- Architectural styles: Old Colonial Georgian; Victorian Regency
- Owner: Property NSW

New South Wales Heritage Register
- Official name: Union Bond Store (former); Westpac Bank
- Type: State heritage (built)
- Designated: 10 May 2002
- Reference no.: 1612
- Type: Warehouse/storage area
- Category: Maritime Industry

The Union Bond Store is a heritage-listed former warehouse, bond store and Westpac bank branch and museum located at 47 George Street in the inner city Sydney suburb of The Rocks in the City of Sydney local government area of New South Wales, Australia. It was designed by John Bibb and built from 1841 to 1842. It is also known as Union Bond Store (former) and Westpac Bank. The property is owned by Property NSW, an agency of the Government of New South Wales. It was added to the New South Wales State Heritage Register on 10 May 2002.

== History ==
The story of European occupation in the vicinity of the subject property began with the lease of land on the western foreshores of Sydney Cove to Captain Henry Waterhouse c. 1799. Charles Grimes's Plan of Sydney, prepared in 1800, shows three parcels of land held by Waterhouse on the foreshore near present-day Campbell's Cove. The alignment of George Street appears to have run between these parcels of land. It appears that Waterhouse only held his leaseholds at The Rocks for one year, and does not appear to have built on them during his tenure.

=== Occupation by Robert Campbell ===
Land on the western side of George Street (between Argyle and Cumberland Streets) was from 1800 occupied by Robert Campbell, one of Sydney's most prominent merchants in the first decades of European settlement. He acquired Captain Waterhouse's leases in The Rocks soon after Waterhouse's return to England in 1800. The 1807 James Meehan's Plan of the Town of Sydney shows two leaseholds occupied by Campbell on the western foreshores of Sydney Cove. Lot 1 is the large rectangular parcel of land on the western side of George Street (and may also include land to the north, on the waterfront), while Lot 2 is a small square directly addressing the waterfront in the vicinity of today's Campbell's Cove. Campbell was officially granted this land (the Lot 2) in 1814.

The Lot 1, on the western side of George Street, was officially granted to Campbell on 16 October 1834 by Governor Richard Bourke. This land was divided into four allotments. Allotment 1 comprised 3 rods and 34 perches. A plan of The Rocks dated to 1835 does not show this land grant, only the extent of Campbell's earlier grant on the western foreshores of Sydney Cove is marked on this plan. In the early 1840s, Campbell set about subdividing his land holdings in The Rocks, particularly the land from the 1834 grant that was set back from the wharves and therefore less useful to his mercantile enterprises. On a personal note, Campbell was spending less time in Sydney following the death of his wife in 1833, and was increasingly living at his property Duntroon, near Canberra.

In 1841, Allotment 1 of Campbell's grant on the western side of George Street was subdivided into six lots. The subject property is located on Lot 4 of this subdivision. On 2 July 1841, Lots 3 and 4 from Allotment 1 of Campbell's 1834 grant were purchased by John Martyn and James Combes. The Union Bond Store at 47 George Street, The Rocks, was built in c. 1841-43 on Lot 4, at the same time as a matching three-storey warehouse on the opposite corner (on the southern side of Union Street) on Lot 5. Both warehouses were built for John Martyn and James Combes to a design by architect John Bibb. A plan at the Mitchell Library dated to June 1841 shows the street and side elevations of a warehouse building designed by John Bibb for Martyn & Combes, ideally symmetrical to the existing subject property. Bibb is also speculated to be the architect for Merchants House at 43 George Street, to the north of the subject property (built in 1848). John Martyn and James Combes were brothers-in-law and business partners. They traded as Martyn & Combes, a "plumbing, painting and glazing business", but as the nineteenth century progressed, their business interests diversified, and they became known as merchants. By 1848, they were operating from a building on the junction of Jamison and George Streets, near Wynyard, possibly used as a warehouse / office. In 1847, Lot 5 of Allotment 1 of Campbell's grant (adjoining Lot 4 to the south) was acquired by Martyn & Combes, from the estate of Robert Campbell who had died the year before. In c. 1848, Martyn & Combes oversaw construction of the Merchants House at 43 George Street, along with an infill warehouse building between it and the adjoining subject property (45 George Street).

The first recorded tenant at 47 George Street was Ashford Daniels, who occupied the building on a yearly lease from August 1843. The matching warehouse at 49 George Street on the southern side of Atherden Street was also owned by Martyn & Combes and was leased by Thomas Woolley. Both buildings were described in the Council Rates records in 1845 as "new no back premises" and were valued at £70 apiece. The Council Rates records for 1848 show that 47 George Street was vacant in this year. From c. 1851 to 1855, 47 George Street was occupied by Martyn & Combes. Richard Fawcett was appointed manager of Martyn & Combes in 1853, and two years later was recorded as the occupier at both 43 George Street (Merchants House) and 47 George Street.

47 George Street was occupied by Lotz & Larnach, merchants, from c. 1858-65; Walker & Co was listed as a co-occupant in c. 1857. The subject property was occupied by R Thompson, Sergeant of Police, in 1866, but was vacant the following year. In 1868–69, Martyn and Combes resumed occupation at 47 George Street, followed by William Martyn, the eldest son of John Martyn, in 1870–71.

The longest term tenant at 47 George Street was the pharmaceutical manufacturing and distribution firm of Edward Row & Co, from 1875 to c. 1921. The company was at the corner of King Street and Bank Court in 1855 and appears to have been trading at 219 Pitt Street from at least 1871, prior to moving to premises in The Rocks in 1875. Edward Row & Co. manufactured drugs and remedies onsite but was also a wholesale distributor of pharmaceutical products to NSW and Queensland. An advertisement for the company indicates it had been trading since 1820 (probably in England). The firm of Edward Row & Co. was declared bankrupt three times in the nineteenth century, first in 1866 and twice in 1875. Edward Row & Co's signature product was Row's Embrocation, a liniment originally intended for horses and livestock and known as the 'Farmer's Friend'. By the late nineteenth century, its use was extended to people. In 1880, Row's Embrocation was promoted as a cure for gout, rheumatism, "old sores of 30 years standing", burns or scalds and stiffness of joints, and it was claimed that 'Row's Embrocation has no longer a place alone in the Stable, but thousands of families now keep it as an invaluable Embrocation in cases of accident'.

Union Street was renamed Atherden Street in 1875, in honour local resident and landowner George Atherden.

Edward Row & Co. oversaw construction of a rear building along Atherden Street c. 1887 (the rear addition was not shown in Dove's 1880 plan but first appears in 1889). The architect for this additional building was speculated to be Benjamin Martyn, the youngest son of John Martyn. According to Fox & Associates, the stores at 6-8 Atherden Street were "added to the rear portion of property" in 1887: "William Martyn by inheritance was the owner in 1887 and it is suggested that Benjamin Charles Martyn, Architect, and later trustee of the property was responsible for the store erection." This building seems to consist of two elements:

- A skillion roofed sandstone walled section (also referred to as a 'laundry') connected to the Union Bond Store that met the Union Bond Store in a horizontal flashing at second floor level and sloped to the west; and
- A single storey shallow pitched gable roofed building fronting Atherden Street.

Edward Row & Co was registered as a business in 1903, under the Registration of Firms Act 1902. Warren, Ernest and Kenneth Row continued the family business manufacturing patent medicines at 43-47 George Street, along with business partners Clive Webb, George Seaborn and Alfred Pettifer. Warren and Ernest were the sons of Edward Row, while Kenneth Row was his grandson (being the son of Warren Row). Cecil Row, recorded as a tenant at Merchants House from c. 1915 – c. 1926 was the grandson of Edward Row and the youngest son of Warren Row (born in 1892). Edward Row & Co. remained at the subject property until c. 1921, followed by Blake & Hargreaves, printers, from c. 1921 to 1925. The rear addition along Atherden Street was occupied by Bushells Ltd from 1914 until at least 1933, and was used as the Bushell's Coffee Factory.

=== Resumption by the New South Wales Government ===
The ownership of the subject property changed halfway through Edward Row & Co's tenancy. Much of the land and many of the houses, shops, pubs and warehouses in The Rocks, including the subject property, were resumed by the NSW Government in the early 1900s.

From 1927 to 1937, the subject property was used as a bond store and was known as Clelands Bonded Free Store. The Customs House at Circular Quay was used as a clearing house for port transactions, where goods were cleared or stored until duties were paid on them. Bonded goods, meaning goods that had bonds placed on them prior to being cleared through customs, were traditionally stored in the Queens Warehouse which adjoined the Customs House, but the growth of trade to Sydney in the nineteenth century meant that much of this storage was contracted out to private bond storage companies such as Clelands Bonded and Free Stores, which later used a warehouse on Playfair Street (adjoining Argyle Stores).

From c. 1931 – c. 1941, the subject property was leased and occupied by H. A. Zlotkowski Pty Ltd, as a "store for cork etc". From c. 1941 – c. 1972, the subject property was leased and occupied by an importation company, Craig, Mostyn & Co Pty Ltd. Initially, the building was used as the "No 2 Store" by the company, but by 1949 it had been 'partly converted into a bottling plant and distribution centre. Large, custom built concrete tanks were installed to hold the best-selling wines in bulk, the less popular lines being stored in hogsheads or puncheons on the first floor until needed for bottling on the ground floor. The Berri Co-op supplied the wine and spirits for bottling in the early days. These included brandy, gin and fortified wines such as port, muscat and sherry. By the early 1960s, the warehouse was being used "for the purpose of storage of skins, fruit and general merchandise". In April 1966, Craig, Mostyn & Co Pty Ltd sublet the premises to P. Heath, Baggage, Shipping and Forwarding Agent, as stores and offices.

Although there is speculation that 47 George Street was restored in the late 1960s for use as offices, this is not evident on the Maritime Services Board (MSB) tenancy cards. The MSB had ownership of buildings in The Rocks, including the subject property, until c. 1970. It is possible that the Sydney Cove Redevelopment Authority (SCRA) oversaw restoration works at 47 George Street when they took control of The Rocks in the early 1970s, although no documentation of these works came to light during research for the Conservation Management Plan in 2007. There is, however, photographic evidence that repainting was carried out in c. 1977. The SCRA was responsible for renaming the subject property as the Union Bond Store, in honour of the earlier name of Atherden Street, although the building had only briefly been used as a bonded store.

The tenant at 47 George Street is not known from c. 1973 – c. 1980, although it is likely that Howard O'Farrell & Co occupied the building for at least some of this period. In c. 1981, the subject property was occupied by Howard O'Farrell & Co Pty Ltd, and used for offices and storage. The building at the rear (6-8 Atherden Street) was used as parking "for themselves and others".

In 1985, the City of Sydney Council approved a Building Application for the "restoration of sandstone warehouse and infill additions to sandstone warehouse". In 1988, works began to refurbish the subject property for use as a branch of the Westpac Bank and a museum upstairs and at the rear. The ground floor of the warehouse building was converted for use as a banking chamber including reproduction Victorian timber counters and wall panelling. The rear addition addressing Atherden Street was demolished and replaced with existing double storey building to accommodate the Westpac Museum. The museum also used the upper storeys of the former warehouse. In 2008 Westpac moved out of the building and as of January 2009 the building was vacant.

== Description ==
The building is a simple sandstone warehouse built c. 1840. The building is of three stories and three bays wide, the otherwise severe facade relieved by a pedimented gable with a circular ventilator, horizontal string courses and deeply recessed windows of varying heights. Restored in the late 1960s, the bond store was used for offices and named Union Bond as a reminder of the street name prior to 1880.

Style: Old Colonial Georgian; Storeys: three; Roof Cladding: Galvanised Iron; Floor Frame: Timber.

=== Condition ===
As at 3 May 2001, Archaeology Assessment Condition: Partly disturbed. Assessment Basis: Floors level with George Street. Stone quarried out at rear. Westpac Bank vacated the building in 2007.

== Heritage listing ==
As at 1 April 2011, the Westpac Bank and site are of State heritage significance for their historical and scientific cultural values. The site and building are also of State heritage significance for their contribution to The Rocks area which is of State Heritage significance in its own right.

The Union Bond Store at 47 George Street, The Rocks is important at a State level because it demonstrates Sydney's early to mid nineteenth century mercantile character associated with the nearby Circular Quay which was then Australia's principal port. The Union Bond Store is a rare example of a single bay warehouse in remarkable condition from this period. The commercial warehouse use can still be seen in its:

- Face sandstone walls;
- Warehouse doors on each level;
- Cathead beam;
- Roof structure (to accommodate this beam and its loading); and
- The internal large second floor hatch for winching goods between levels.

The Union Bond Store forms part of the historic mid nineteenth century group (43-49 George Street) which also includes:

- The adjacent Merchants House at 43 George Street;
- Its narrow infill warehouse at 45 George Street; and
- the site of demolished twin warehouse across Atherden Street (at 49 George Street).

This group is important at a State level for its demonstration of how Sydney merchants in the mid-nineteenth century lived adjacent to their warehouses within a short distance of the port, in a similar manner to European mercantile practice from at least Renaissance times. The relatively fine architectural detailing of the group demonstrates the prosperity that merchant companies were experiencing at the time. The Union Bond Store was designed by the notable English-born architect John Bibb (1810–62). Bibb trained under the architect John Verge and was one of the pre-eminent exponents of Victorian Regency and early Victorian Classic Revival architecture in Sydney from the 1840s to the early 1860s. The Bond Store is one of the few remaining examples of Bibb's early work, and possibly his only remaining warehouse building in Sydney.

The building's refined Victorian Regency style is noteworthy, particularly as most other warehouses built around this time (1840s) tended to be more utilitarian in character. The building has associations with a series of persons and groups of importance in the history of commercial activities in NSW. From the time of its construction in 1841, until it was resumed by the State Government at the beginning of the twentieth century, the ownership of the subject property remained with the prominent NSW building and merchant families Martyn and Combes. From 1875 to c. 1921 the longest term tenant at these premises were Edward Row & Co. who used the buildings as factories and warehousing for their pharmaceutical business (and it is possible that they also used the adjacent Merchants House as a residence during their tenancy). The adaptation of the Union Bond Store in the 1980s as a Westpac Bank branch and Museum of Banking is of local significance in demonstrating the late twentieth century adaptation of warehouse buildings in The Rocks to business and cultural uses.

The archaeological potential of the immediate grounds of the Union Bond Store is moderate, and material is likely to be of Local significance, as the grounds were disturbed by the replacement of the ground floor with concrete in the 1960s. The archaeological potential of grounds at 6-8 Atherden Street is limited by the 1985 demolition of the adjacent former factory (built late c. 1880s) and the subsequent excavations to construct the Westpac Bank Museum.

The archaeological potential of the associated site of the demolished twin warehouse at 49 George Street (together with other parts of Atherden Street formerly covered by early to mid 19th century buildings) is high, with material likely to include relics of State significance.

Union Bond Store was listed on the New South Wales State Heritage Register on 10 May 2002 having satisfied the following criteria.

The place is important in demonstrating the course, or pattern, of cultural or natural history in New South Wales.

The Westpac Bank and site are of State heritage significance for their historical and scientific cultural values. The site and building are also of State heritage significance for their contribution to The Rocks area which is of State Heritage significance in its own right.

The Union Bond Store at 47 George Street, The Rocks is important at a State level because it demonstrates Sydney's early to mid nineteenth century mercantile character associated with the nearby Circular Quay which was then Australia's principal port. The Union Bond Store is important at a State level as part of the historic mid nineteenth century group (43-49 George Street) which includes the adjacent Merchants House and its narrow warehouse and the site of demolished twin warehouse across Atherden Street (49 George Street). The building (individually and as part of this group) demonstrates how merchants in the mid-nineteenth century lived adjacent to their warehouses within a short distance of the port, in a similar manner to European mercantile practice from at least Renaissance times. The relatively fine architectural detailing of the group (including the demolished matching warehouse which stood immediately across Atherden Street) demonstrates the prosperity which merchant companies were experiencing at the time. The Union Bond Store is important at a State level for its contribution to the historic precinct now known as The Rocks, and demonstrates one of the principal phases of the history of The Rocks. The adaptation of the building in the 1980s as the Westpac Museum is of local significance in demonstrating the late twentieth century adaptation of The Rocks warehouse buildings to business and cultural uses. The Union Bond Store meets this criterion at State Level.

The place has a strong or special association with a person, or group of persons, of importance of cultural or natural history of New South Wales's history.

The Union Bond Store is important to NSW for its associations with the architect John Bibb. It is one of the few remaining examples of his early work, and possibly his only remaining warehouse building in Sydney. The building is also significant at a State level for its associations with two important mercantile families. From the time of its construction, until it was resumed by the State Government at the beginning of the twentieth century, the ownership of the subject property remained with its original owners: John Martyn and James Combes and their descendants (Martyn and Combes were brothers-in-law as well as business partners). From 1875 to c. 1921, the longest term tenant at these premises was Edward Row & Co. who used the buildings as laboratories to prepare drugs / medicines and liniments, and later their famous cordial; the buildings were also used as warehouses to store products manufactured on-site and sourced elsewhere, because the company was responsible for the distribution of drugs, as well as their manufacture. It is possible that the Edward Row & Co. used the Merchants House as a residence during their tenancy. Between 1882 and 1921, the properties were rated together in the Council Rates Records.

The Union Bond Store is important at a Local level for its associations with the Westpac Bank, which oversaw the construction of the new building on the Atherden Street frontage in the 1980s, for use as a museum of Banking. The Union Bond Store meets this criterion at State Level.

The place is important in demonstrating aesthetic characteristics and/or a high degree of creative or technical achievement in New South Wales.

The Union Bond Store is of State significance as a fine example of a Victorian Regency warehouse building designed by the notable architect John Bibb. English-born architect John Bibb (1810–62) was one of the pre-eminent exponents of Victorian Regency, and early Victorian Classic Revival architecture in Sydney from the 1840s to the early 1860s. Bibb trained under the architect John Verge, and took over some of his jobs when Verge gave up his practice in 1837. From the 1840s, Bibb had varied commissions, including domestic dwellings and commercial and ecclesiastical buildings. The Union Bond Store is also important for its ability to contribute to the technical history of warehousing in mid-nineteenth century NSW. This warehouse use can still be readily understood through the gantry beam, internal floor hatch and paired warehouse doors on each floor. The Union Bond Store meets this criterion at State Level.

The place has a strong or special association with a particular community or cultural group in New South Wales for social, cultural or spiritual reasons.

The Rocks as a whole is highly valued throughout Australia as a precinct with strong connections to important Australian historical themes. The Union Bond Store does not have strong or special association with a particular community or cultural group in NSW or The Rocks area for social, cultural or spiritual reasons. The Union Bond Store does not meet this criterion.

The place has potential to yield information that will contribute to an understanding of the cultural or natural history of New South Wales.

The archaeological potential of the site of the Union Bond Store relates to the early development of The Rocks as well as late nineteenth and early twentieth century development. The surviving archaeological material on the site of the Union Bond Store is likely to be of local significance, being limited by the replacement of the ground floor of the Union Bond Store in concrete in the 1960s. The archaeological material on the site of 6-8 Atherden Street is limited by the 1985 demolition of the adjacent former factory (built in the late 1880s) and the subsequent excavations to construct the Westpac Bank Museum. The Union Bond Store meets this criterion at a local level.

In addition, the probability of discovering significant archaeological material on the site of the demolished twin warehouse site (49 George Street) across Atherden Street (and on the other parts of Atherden Street formerly covered by buildings) is high and the archaeological material in these areas may include relics of State level of significance.

The place possesses uncommon, rare or endangered aspects of the cultural or natural history of New South Wales.

The Union Bond Store is a rare example of a single bay warehouse in remarkable condition from this early nineteenth-century period. It is also noteworthy for its architectural presentation in the refined Regency style. The demolition of its twin warehouse on the opposite corner of Atherden Street has to a degree impacted on its value under this criterion, however the surviving warehouse is of value in its own right. Other warehouses built at this time (1840s) tended to be more utilitarian in character. The Union Bond Store meets this criterion at State Level.

The place is important in demonstrating the principal characteristics of a class of cultural or natural places/environments in New South Wales.

The Union Bond Store is an intact representative example of a mid nineteenth century commercial warehouse building. The side elevation to Atherden Street retains its warehouse doors on each level. In addition, the building retains its cathead beam and the roof structure to accommodate this beam and its loading, as well as the internal large floor hatch for winching goods between levels. The machinery associated with the winching process has been removed. The Union Bond Store meets this criterion at local level.

== See also ==
- Australian non-residential architectural styles
- Metcalfe Bond Stores
