= Harrington's Buildings =

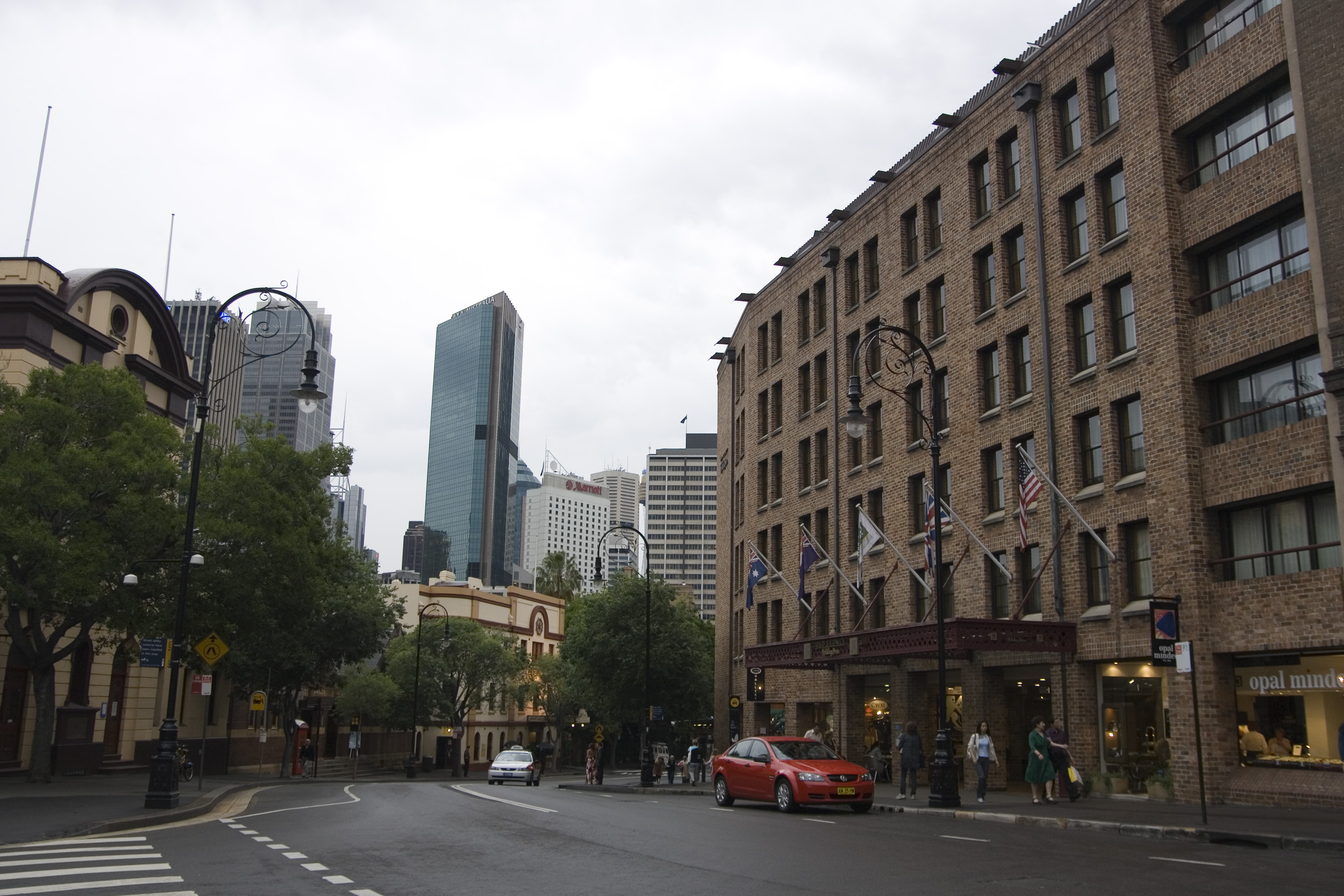
- Harrington's Buildings, now repurposed as Old Sydney Holiday Inn, pictured in 2007.

- Location within Sydney Location within Australia
- 33.8580°S 151.2086°E
- Location: 53–65 George Street, The Rocks, City of Sydney, New South Wales, Australia

History
- Built: 1924–1925
- Built for: Harrington Limited

Site notes
- Architectural style: Industrial Edwardian
- Owner: Property NSW

New South Wales Heritage Register
- Official name: Old Sydney Holiday Inn; Harrington's Buildings; Old Sydney Park Royal Hotel
- Type: State heritage (built)
- Designated: 10 May 2002
- Reference no.: 1566
- Type: Hotel
- Category: Commercial
- Builders: Concrete Constructions Ltd.

Harrington's Buildings is a heritage-listed hotel located at 53–65 George Street, Sydney, Australia. Situated within The Rocks historic precinct, it was built from 1924 to 1925 by Concrete Constructions Limited. It is also known as Old Sydney Holiday Inn and Old Sydney Park Royal Hotel. The property is owned by the Government of New South Wales and was added to the State Heritage Register on 10 May 2002.

== History ==
The site is part of original grants to John Laurie in October 1816 and Robert Campbell in October 1834.

Approval for the seven-storey Harrington's Building was sought from Sydney City Council on 17 May 1923 by the contractors, Concrete Constructions Pty Ltd. The building of reinforced concrete frame and brick cladding was completed in 1926.

The site had formerly been occupied by several buildings:

- In 1848 George Atherden, Robert Campbell's overseer, built three three-storey houses and shops at 53 - 55 George Street. They were constructed with brick walls and shingled roofs with a semi detached kitchen to the rear and were demolished between 1914 and 1916.
- The land at 2–8 Playfair Street was part of lots 8–13 of William Whaley Billyard's subdivision and in 1875 the lots were conveyed to Thomas Playfair, James Rogers and Alfred Augustus. These lots were resumed by the government in March 1901 under the Observatory Hill Resumption Act 1900. In 1914 the tenements and stables were demolished the continuation of Playfair Street to George Street.

The owner of the new building were Harrington Ltd, metallurgists. Founded in 1906 by John and Thomas Harrington, the company was first involved in gold in Western Australia then in silver residue technology connected with the photographic industry. The company was operating from 525 Kent Street in 1906 and by 1909 had moved to 386 George Street. In 1919 it was operating from main office and laboratory at 386 George Street with stores at 57–59 George Street North, adjacent to the site of the 1923 building. Photos of the interior of the laboratories are in the possession of John Cooke Jnr whose father took over the running of the company in 1945, a few years before the death of the last Harrington brother. Harringtons Ltd merged in the 1990s with another company and is now known as Golden West.

To the north was a stone store, built in 1844 by Martyn and Coombes later used as the Catholic Mission for seamen and demolished in 1920 to make way for the widened Playfair Street to connect to George Street.

To the south a series of three stores were built between 1895 and 1918. At least one of these was occupied by Harringtons Ltd (from 1914). The words "Harringtons Buildings" were prominently displayed. The store at 63–65 George Street and a large part of 57–59 George Street were demolished in 1952–53 after damage by fire. The remainder of these buildings were demolished to make way for extensions to the Old Sydney Inn (now the Park Royal) in 1980 into which the Harringtons Building at 53 - 55 George Street was incorporated.

Work on the conversion of the L-shaped Harrington's Buildings and its incorporation into a 180-room hotel, with the whole enclosing a roofed court of atrium, started in 1981. The work involved major internal structural changes, and was completed and opened in 1984.

== Description ==
Style: Industrial Edwardian; Storeys: Seven; Facade: Brick and concrete walls; Roof Cladding: Asphalt; Floor Frame: Concrete.

=== Condition ===
Partially demolished.

=== Modifications and dates ===
- 1981–84: Harrington's Buildings were partially demolished and current Old Sydney Park Royal Hotel was built.

== Heritage listing ==
As at 30 March 2011, the Harrington's Buildings site are of State heritage significance for their historical and scientific cultural values. The site and building are also of State heritage significance for their contribution to The Rocks area which is of State Heritage significance in its own right.

Harrington's Buildings, now the northern part of the Old Sydney Park Royal Hotel, is significant as one of a large number of warehouses built in The Rocks close to wharf facilities. The site is part of an 1816 land grant and has association with Robert Campbell and George Atherden, major players in the early development of The Rocks, and with the Harringtons, Sydney industrialists in the early 20th century. The building has landmark significance being on a prominent corner, and as part of a group of early 20th century buildings in George Street North, relating well in scale, materials, façade treatment and fenestration to the Metcalfe Bond stores, the ASN Co Building and No 88 George Street.

Harrington's Buildings was listed on the New South Wales State Heritage Register on 10 May 2002 having satisfied the following criteria.

The place is important in demonstrating the course, or pattern, of cultural or natural history in New South Wales.

The Harrington's Buildings site are of State heritage significance for their historical and scientific cultural values. The site and building are also of State heritage significance for their contribution to The Rocks area which is of State Heritage significance in its own right.

Harrington's Buildings, now the northern part of the Old Sydney Park Royal Hotel, is significant as one of a large number of warehouses built in The Rocks close to wharf facilities.

The place has a strong or special association with a person, or group of persons, of importance of cultural or natural history of New South Wales's history.

The site is part of an 1816 land grant and has association with Robert Campbell and George Atherden, major players in the early development of The Rocks, and with the Harringtons, Sydney industrialists in the early 20th century.

The place is important in demonstrating aesthetic characteristics and/or a high degree of creative or technical achievement in New South Wales.

The building has landmark significance being on a prominent corner, and as part of a group of early 20th century buildings in George Street North, relating well in scale, materials, façade treatment and fenestration to the Metcalfe Bond Stores, the ASN Co building and the Old Bushells Factory at 88 George Street.

== See also ==
- Australian non-residential architectural styles
