= Metcalfe Bond Stores =

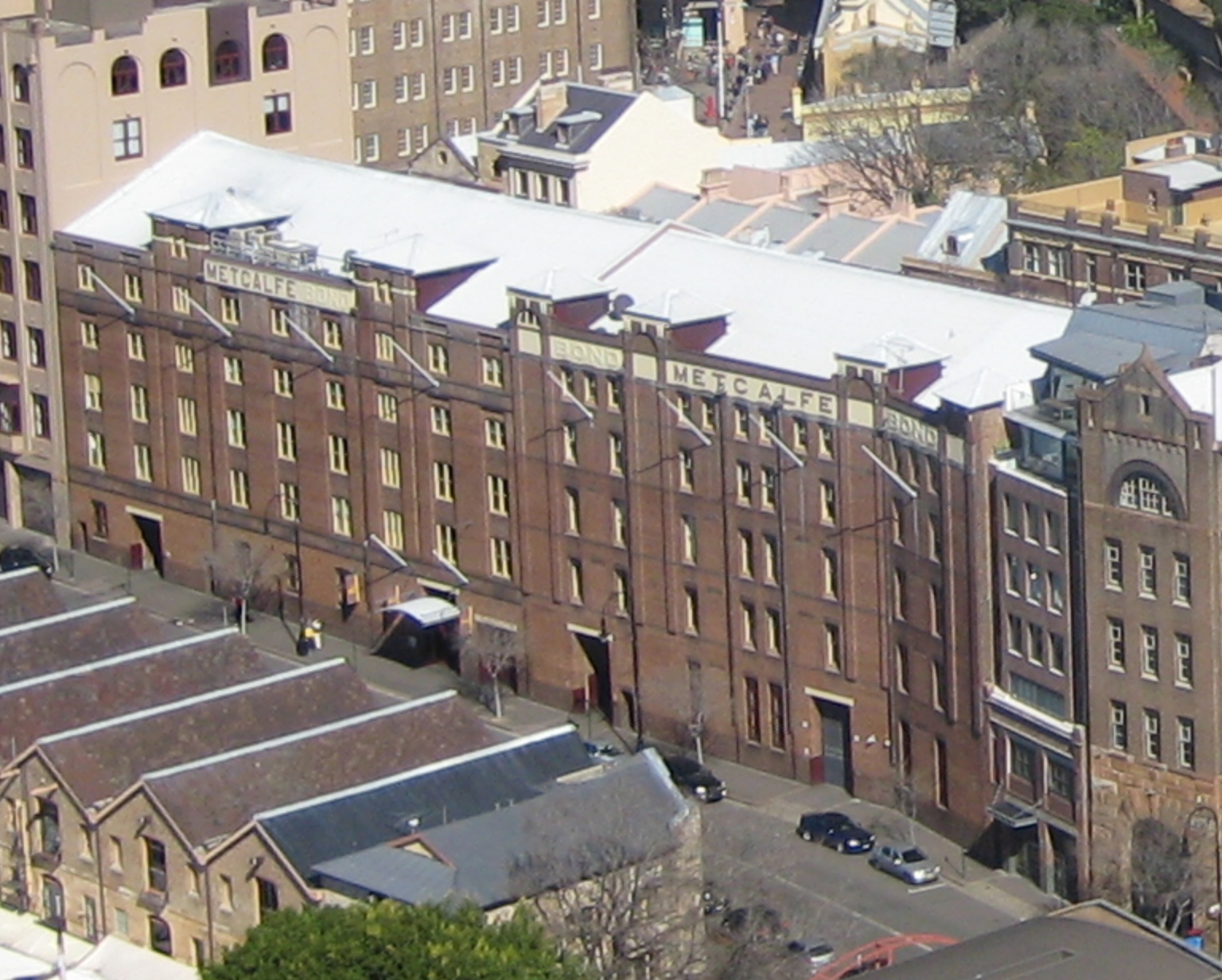
- Metcalfe Bond Stores, viewed from the Sydney Harbour Bridge, in 2008. The road below is Hickson Road with Campbell's Stores pictured at left.

- Location within Sydney Location within Australia
- 33.8570°S 151.2087°E
- Location: 68–84 George Street, The Rocks, City of Sydney, New South Wales, Australia

History
- Built: 1912–1916

Site notes
- Architectural style: Federation Warehouse
- Owner: Property NSW

New South Wales Heritage Register
- Official name: Metcalfe Bond Stores; New Metcalfe Bond Stores
- Type: State heritage (built)
- Designated: 10 May 2002
- Reference no.: 1562
- Type: Warehouse/storage area
- Category: Maritime Industry

The Metcalfe Bond Stores is a heritage-listed former bond store and warehouse and now shops and offices located at 68–84 George Street in the inner city Sydney suburb of The Rocks in the City of Sydney local government area of New South Wales, Australia. It was built from 1912 to 1916. It is also known as New Metcalfe Bond Stores. The property is owned by Property NSW, an agency of the Government of New South Wales. It was added to the New South Wales State Heritage Register on 10 May 2002.

== History ==
The building stands upon the site of the former garden and orchard for Robert Campbell's Wharf House (1800–1883), itself on a grant made to Campbell on 29 June 1814. Part of it was later used as a quarry. The existing stone retaining wall at George Street probably dates from the mid to late 19th century. For much of the 19th century the site was apparently used as Campbell's garden and was acquired by the Colonial Government in 1887 and then used as a stone quarry. In 1900 the site was vested in the NSW Government as part of the Darling Harbour Resumptions, following the outbreak of bubonic plague.

In 1912, a three-storey warehouse used by Upward & Co., Bonded and Free Stores was resumed and demolished to allow the formation of Hickson Road. The company required new storage space to replace the demolished building. Upward & Co. was founded by John Upward (1854-1918) born in London, who arrived in NSW in 1862. After time in Queensland, he returned to NSW in 1874 and found employment with the Australasian Steam Navigation Company (ASN). He returned to Qld. as manager of ASN's Cairns branch, returning to NSW again to take charge of its bonded stores. Upward approached ASN in 1880 and as a result took over its interests in the bond and ran it as his "private concern", Upward & Co. In August 1912 John Upward signed a 50-year lease on a parcel of land with a frontage of 81m on the eastern side of George Street. One condition of the lease was that "a building to the value of at least 10,000 pounds was erected thereon".

The land on which this building now stands was leased from the Government for 50 years. The Metcalfe Bond Stores was built in two sections, the northern section in 1912^{a}and the southern section in 1916.

On his death in 1918 the company was managed by his son, Leonard.

At the conclusion of the 50-year lease period, Upward & Co. continued to occupy the building as tenants until 1972 – some seven years. Once the company had vacated the building, the building reverted to Government ownership, but Upward & Co. stayed on as tenants. On 12 January 1970 ownership of the building passed to the Sydney Cove Redevelopment Authority (SCRA). In 1972 the Authority commenced work on the staged conversion of the store to offices, galleries, shops and restaurants. Plans for these works were carried out by architects Devine, Erby Mazlin, who also renovated Campbell's Stores at West Circular Quay, for the SCRA.

Amongst various modifications was a fitout for the Pancakes at the Rocks restaurant and for W Kennedy's Old Spaghetti Factory restaurant. Works associated with the fitout were situated on part of the lower ground floor, ground and first floors. A kitchen with large cool room and store were installed at the southern end of the ground floor, a new stair linking these with the restaurant above. New floors were introduced over existing flooring on the restaurant level and the floor was strengthened to support a feature tram car. Storage was situated in the lower ground floor. The Old Spaghetti Factory moved into the building in early 1973. It seems to have been an instant success and was even visited by international celebrities (for instance the "Rolling Stones" English band were photographed in the tram in the restaurant in 1973). By the second half of 1988 the establishment was being touted as a venue for "family fun".

Further change to the building occurred in 1984. An arcade of part of the ground floor was documented early that year, and extended along the entire level to include a link to 86 George Street, necessitating a reduction in size of staff amenities area associated with the Old Spaghetti Factory, which occurred in 1984 or 1985. The restaurant kitchen was modified around the end of 1986 with a relocated cool room.

In 2011 Sydney Harbour Foreshore Authority undertook extensive base works, including upgrading amenities, lifts, stairwells, toilets and building services. The site formed part of Robert Campbell's garden from c. 1802-1870s. By the end of this period there is some evidence that stone was being quarried. A rough faced ashlar retaining wall is visible in the basement of the building along the George St frontage which may date to 1880s or earlier. Current Bond Store building constructed c. 1913. In 1970 the Sydney Cove Authority occupied part of the building.

== Description ==
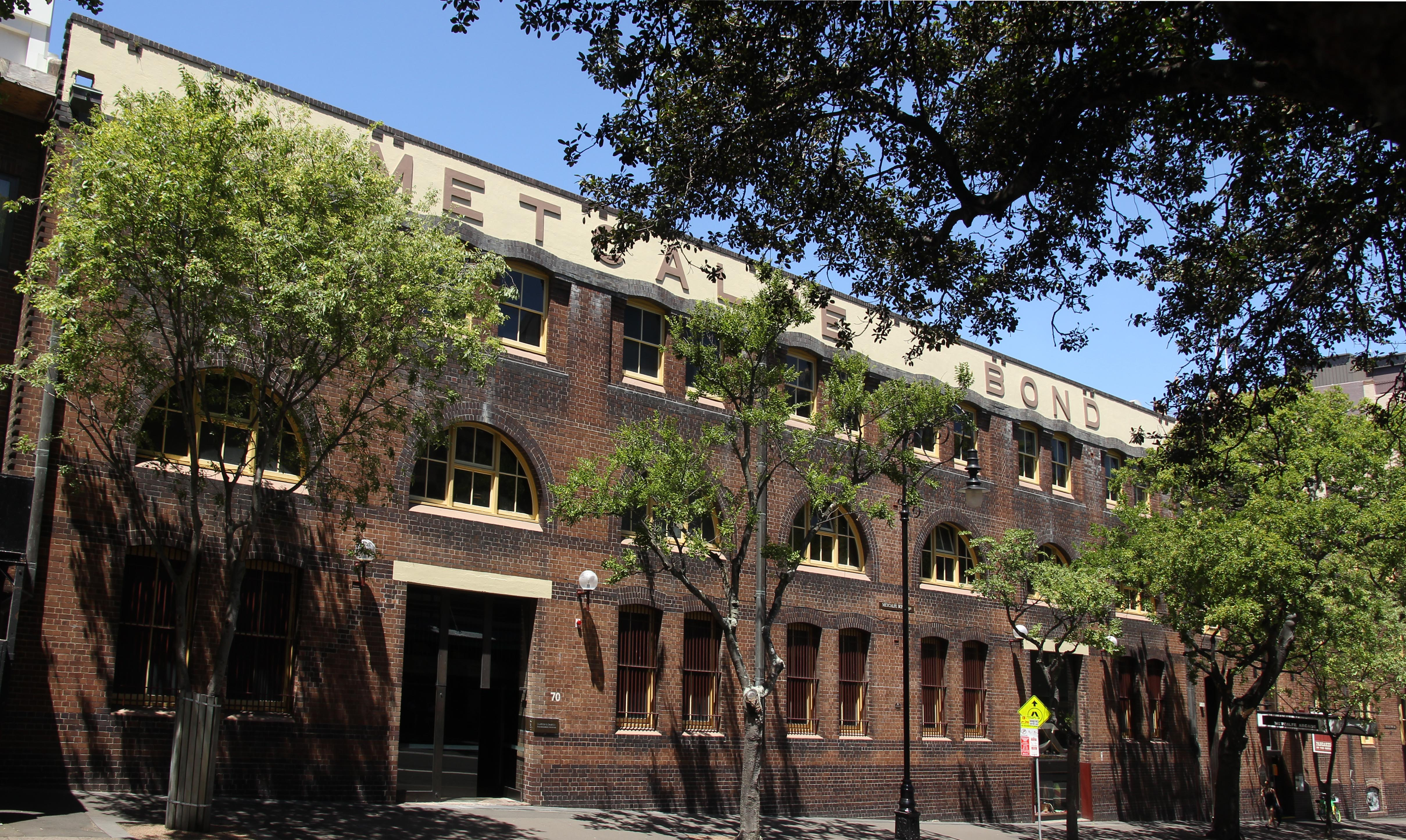
The three-storey view from George Street, The Rocks, pictured in 2019.

The Metcalfe Bond comprises two adjacent buildings, both simple bond stores in the functionalist tradition with timber post and beam interior construction. Exterior walls are of load bearing red brick with minimal darker brick outlines. 66-76 George Street: The older of the two buildings, built in 1912, comprises three storeys to George Street and five to Hickson Road, seven bays long with a stucco parapet. Openings on ground and second floors are semi-circular in shape. 78-84 George Street: Located south of the earlier building and built in 1916, also of three storeys to George Street, five to Hickson Road but nine bays long. The parapet is stepped, dividing the façade into three large sections. All openings are rectangular with two prominent string courses between the first and second floors. The brick detailing is more elaborate than the 1912 store, but the two form a harmonious whole of uniform height and texture.

Style: Federation Warehouse; Storeys: five; Roof cladding: corrugated iron; Floor frame: timber.

=== Condition ===
As at 3 May 2001, Archaeology Assessment Condition: Destroyed Assessment Basis: Site redeveloped in 1994. Former petrol station. Monitoring of works indicated fuel tanks on George Street frontage cut into bedrock, machinery / car hoist foundations at rear obliterated any former evidence of site use. Some demolition material noted on site but this had been churned up by site preparation works in 1953. Investigation: Monitoring of demolition of Petrol Station 1994. The archaeology is destroyed.

=== Modifications and dates ===
- Built – North: 1912–13; South: 1916
- 1926 – Alterations to the building were carried out by Walter Gawne & Sons, Builders, of Newtown.
- 1973 – The SCRA completed major renovations of the New Metcalfe Bond Store which enabled the letting of a large area as a major restaurant in March. The SCRA's offices were also located in the New Metcalfe Bond.
- 1975 – Work on the remainder of the building was completed, and the building fully occupied as offices, the Australia Music Centre, restaurants and a shopping arcade.
- 1986 – The Metcalfe Arcade was extended southwards to connect with the foyer of 88 George Street.

== Heritage listing ==
As at 30 March 2011, Metcalfe Bond Stores and site are of State heritage significance for their historical and scientific cultural values. The site and building are also of State heritage significance for their contribution to The Rocks area which is of State Heritage significance in its own right.

The building known as the Metcalfe Bond Stores has simple unobtrusive lines with pleasing rhythm and texture. The building has landmark significance as part of a group of early 20th century buildings in George Street North complementing in scale, materials, façade treatment and fenestration the ASN Co building, No 88 George Street, and the Harrington's Buildings, and being visible as a backdrop to Campbell's Stores from Campbell's Cove, Sydney Cove and Harbour, and Circular Quay East. Its conversion to shops and offices in 1973 also demonstrates attitudes to conservation philosophy and practice of the period as the first such conversion by the SCRA.

Metcalfe Bond Stores was listed on the New South Wales State Heritage Register on 10 May 2002 having satisfied the following criteria.

The place is important in demonstrating the course, or pattern, of cultural or natural history in New South Wales.

Metcalfe Bond Stores and site are of State heritage significance for their historical and scientific cultural values. The site and building are also of State heritage significance for their contribution to The Rocks area which is of State Heritage significance in its own right.

The place is important in demonstrating aesthetic characteristics and/or a high degree of creative or technical achievement in New South Wales.

The building known as the Metcalfe Bond Stores has simple unobtrusive lines with pleasing rhythm and texture. The building has landmark significance as part of a group of early 20th century buildings in George Street North complementing in scale, materials, façade treatment and fenestration the ASN Co Building, No 88 George Street, and the Harrington's Buildings, and being visible as a backdrop to Campbell's Stores from Campbell's Cove, Sydney Cove and Harbour, and Circular Quay East. Its conversion to shops and offices in 1973 also demonstrates attitudes to conservation philosophy and practice of the period as the first such conversion by the SCRA.

== See also ==
- Australian non-residential architectural styles
- ASN Co building
- Campbell's Stores

== Notes ==
^a TKD 2015 say 1913.
