= ASN Co building =

Heritage-listed building in New South Wales, Australia

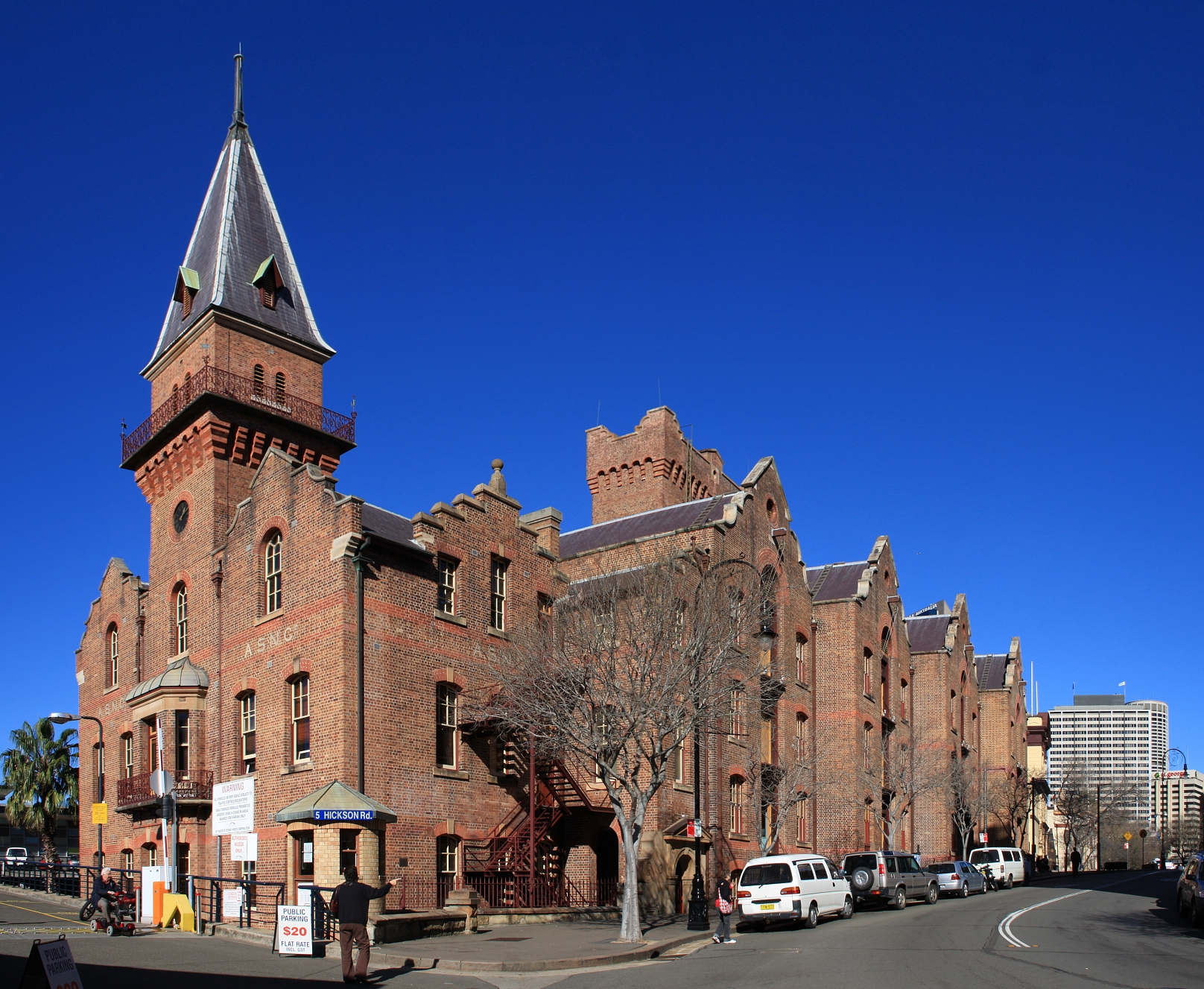
- The ASN Co building in 2009

- Location within Sydney
- Etymology: Australasian Steam Navigation Company

General information
- Status: Completed
- Type: Offices and warehouse; Repurposed as an art gallery
- Architectural style: Pre-Federation Anglo Dutch
- Location: 1–5 Hickson Road, The Rocks, Sydney, New South Wales, Australia
- Coordinates: 33°51′23″S 151°12′32″E
- Construction started: 1884
- Completed: 1885
- Client: Australasian Steam Navigation Company
- Owner: Sydney Harbour Foreshore Authority

Technical details
- Material: Stone and polychrome brick facade; Copper roofed bay; Ornate stone capped gable ends
- Floor count: Five

Design and construction
- Architects: William Wardell; Walter Liberty Vernon
- Main contractor: W. J. Jennings

New South Wales Heritage Register
- Official name: ASN Co Building; Australian Steam Navigation Company Building / Ordnance Stores (Commonwealth)
- Type: State heritage (built)
- Criteria: a., b., c., d., e., f., g.
- Designated: 10 May 2002
- Reference no.: 1526
- Type: Warehouse/storage area
- Category: Maritime Industry
- Builders: W. J. Jennings

The ASN Co building is a heritage-listed building located at 1–5 Hickson Road, The Rocks, Sydney, New South Wales, Australia. Completed in 1885 and built in the Pre-Federation Anglo Dutch style under the direction of William Wardell and his associate, Walter Liberty Vernon, the building served as the principal offices and warehouse for the Australasian Steam Navigation Company until the company's merger in 1887, when the Government of New South Wales acquired the land used for ordinance facilities and later as government administration offices. Since 1989 the building has been owned by the Sydney Cove Redevelopment Authority and its successors. The building is currently used as an art gallery to display the works of Ken Done.

The building is owned by the Sydney Harbour Foreshore Authority and is listed on the (now defunct) Register of the National Estate and on the non-statutory National Trust of Australia heritage register.

== History ==
The land was originally leased to John Baugham by acting Governor Grose in 1794. Baugham sold the lease to Robert Campbell in 1798, who erected Sydney's first private wharf in 1800. Campbell then erected Wharf House behind the wharf as a home for himself and his wife Sophia in 1802. The site continued to be used by the Campbell family until 1876, when the ASN Co acquired part of Robert Campbell's grant. In 1884, construction started on the ASN Co Building which was opened in 1885. It was designed by William Wilkinson Wardell, who had formed a partnership with Walter Liberty Vernon in 1884. It is an excellent example of his style.

The Australasian Steam Navigation Company was formed from the Hunter River Steamship Company in 1851 to appeal to a wider market and expand their services. The company approved free or assisted passages for worthy causes, these included Caroline Chisholm going to Moreton Bay to obtain employment for immigrant women and Dr Ludwig Leichhardt also going to Moreton Bay for an expedition in Queensland, and they shipped plants and specimens for the Botanic Gardens in Melbourne for free.

In 1887, the government purchased the land between Campbell's Stores and Sydney Cove, and demolished all buildings on the site. Later that year the Crown acquired the ASN Co building to be administered by the Sydney Harbour Trust. The company moved out of the building in 1889. In 1890, it was being used as Government Ordnance Stores and by 1892 a number of tenants were in the building. In 1906, the building was handed over to the Department of Defence. Since 1950, it has been occupied by the Australian Commonwealth Offices, when conversions by the Department of Works and Housing made the building suitable for office use. In 1989 the ASN Co building was acquired by the SCRA.

In 1990, Bay 5 of the building was adapted for use, together with the Mariners' Church, for The Story of Sydney, an exhibition of the foundation and development of Sydney. This use ceased in 1991. In 1991–92, the building was restored to its original 1880s appearance both inside and out, and following that has been leased for galleries facing George Street, retail on Circular Quay West and commercial uses on the upper floors.

Previously, the address of the ASN Co Building was 5–7 Hickson Road, but was renumbered to 1–3. The Park Hyatt Hotel is numbered 7 Hickson Road.

== Description ==
The original building, a five-storey - four bay warehouse with an attached single bay of four stories of office space. The design is a "Romantic composition in polychrome brick and sandstone capped by picturesque Dutch gables". The four bays of warehouse are structurally defined as separate areas. Evidence uncovered on the ground, second, third and four floor indicates that the four warehouse bays were linked by a single arched opening, except Bays 4 and 5 which had two openings. The building is described in the Sydney Morning Herald on the date of opening, 25 July 1885, as:

The new buildings are five storeys high, the first storey being of stone and the remaining ones of brick. Among the offices is a spacious board room, available for public meetings of the share-holders. The lowest floor of offices, level with the wharves, and entered there from, comprises the shipping office, marine superintendents office. the traffic superintendent's office and an apartment for the reception of Carter's tickets and general wharf business'.

— Sydney Morning Herald, 23 July 1885.

The timber framed Directory Board of the former Commonwealth Government tenants in the AS&N; Co Building is also of heritage significance. It comprises a shallow box made of timber, with side hinged central opening glass doors, and is headed in gold lettering "Australian Government Offices 1950-1989: Directory Commonwealth Offices". Former offices of the Australasian Steam Navigation Company at northern end.; Built By: 1802.

Style: Pre Federation Anglo Dutch; Storeys: Four; Facade: Stone and polychrome brick facade including copper roofed bay and ornate stone capped gable ends.; Internal Walls: Original set plaster and rendered brick walls with Victorian colour (Bay 1); Lathe and plaster walls (Bay 1); Roof Cladding: Slate; Internal Structure: Original timber post and beam construction with cast iron capitals to the columns (Bays 2–5); Floor Frame: Timber floor; Ceilings: Barrel vaulted brick ceiling (Bay 1); Stairs: Timber staircases and balustrades; Fire Stairs: Bay 2–5- (1949–50); Bay 1- Fire stair to exterior of building (1961) & Steel fire doors c. 1950 and original hardware.; Sprinkler System: Some sprinkler heads date back to 1929, some of the original cast iron pipework is still intact.

The ASN building was one of the earliest in Sydney to be fitted with a water sprinkler system to combat fire, c. 1894, and is possibly the earliest surviving in Sydney. Remains of hoist pulleys and other features of the warehouse were also noted.

In 1887 the Crown acquired the ASN Co building and a few years later it became the Government Ordnance Bond Stores. In 1906 the Department of Defence took control of the building and in 1950 was occupied by the Australian Commonwealth Offices. The remains of hoist pulleys are still visible on the outside of the building.

=== Condition ===
As at 23 March 2004, the archaeological condition of the building was assessed as mostly disturbed. The warehouses cut into hill slope from Circular Quay West. The basements are sited below George Street / Hickson Road level. The building contains significant original fabric. Much of the original fabric of the building is intact.

=== Modifications and dates ===
In 1892–94 the water tower was constructed. As Wardell was alive at this time it is possible that Wardell or Vernon designed the tower. In the 1950s the building was converted to offices which introduced openings through the load bearing walls, and introduced materials such as plywood and fibrous plaster to create offices, concealing the structure. Both the early water tower to Bay 3 (1892–94) and the 1950s lift to Bay 4 additions involved some structural alterations to the fabric.

In 1990, Bay 5 of the building was adapted for use as part of The Story of Sydney. This use ceased in 1991. In 1992–93, the building was restored to its original 1880s appearance both inside and out, including the reinstatement of the large timber windows and doors and removal of the 1950s office partitions, at a total cost of $5.7m.

=== Further information ===
The building is in a reasonably sound condition, having been extensively renovated and conserved in the 1990s. The structure of Bays 1-4 is very much intact with only minor changes, displaying evidence of various alterations, such as fire stairs and lifts in the 1950s. The integrity of the interior of Bay 5 of the warehouse component, however, has been seriously compromised by the removal of most of its internal fabric and adaptation to a cinema complex in 1990.

== Heritage listing ==
Relationship of the ASN Co building and Sydney Harbour Bridge, looking north, pictured at night in 1985. The Overseas Passenger Terminal is pictured at right.

1. As at 30 March 2011, ASN Co Building and site are of State heritage significance for their aesthetic, historical and scientific cultural values. The site and building are also of State heritage significance for their contribution to The Rocks area which is of State Heritage significance in its own right.

The former ASN Co warehouse and office building was built in 1884. The site has a long history because of its prominent location in the Rocks area, situated on the edge of the Quay and adjacent to the various wharfs, within the main commercial maritime centre. It is associated with the famous early merchant, Robert Campbell. No later store of this construction type was built in the area.

The building was designed by the architect William Wilkinson Wardell, who chiefly practiced in Victoria. He was an architect of the nineteenth century who was best known for building churches, including St Mary's Cathedral in Sydney, public buildings, including the Treasury building, the Mint and Government House in Melbourne, banks including the English, Scottish and Australian Bank in George Street, The Rocks as well as warehouses.

The building is an example of the Pre-Federation Anglo-Dutch architectural style, combining office and warehouse functions. Designed by William Wardell, the structure accommodates an irregular site footprint with stepped bays of varying lengths. Historically recognized as a prominent commercial landmark in Sydney, it remains visible from Port Jackson, the North Shore, and vantage points along the Circular Quay to Campbell's Cove vista.

It was one of the last substantial warehouses with a timber structural system built in Sydney, from 1885 cast iron columns were used instead of timber. The construction method of the building is possibly the earliest surviving example of the use in Sydney of steam cranes imported from England. The importance of steam shipping to the colony's economy is strongly reflected through the high architectural style and the prominent waterfront location of the building.

The building is significant as a Landmark building, from its original construction to the present day in Sydney. It holds significance in its associations with The Rocks, Campbell Cove and Circular Quay and is part of a historical precinct that includes Cadmans Cottage, Mission to Seaman Chapel and the Sailors Home which together strongly illustrate this former maritime neighbourhood. It contributes strongly to the character of The Rocks and is an area that is well visited by residents and tourists. Its inclusion on the registers of the National Trust and the National Estate demonstrate the esteem the building is held in by the broader community.

It is a benchmark building form capable of providing information about the special relationship between its design and function, being a very rare example of a mix of office and warehouse. It has research and scientific potential in the information that its fabric displays and retains, including the very early sprinkler system. It is possible that the sprinkler system is a rare surviving example, with cast iron pipework and 1929 sprinkler heads still intact. The remaining early sprinkler pipework is probably part of the original sprinkler system, possibly being installed when the water tower was constructed between 1892 and 1894.

ASN Co building was listed on the New South Wales State Heritage Register on 10 May 2002 having satisfied the following criteria.

The place is important in demonstrating the course, or pattern, of cultural or natural history in New South Wales.

The former ASN Co warehouse and office building was built in 1884 by W W Wardell. The site has a long history because of its prominent location in the Rocks area, situated on the edge of the Quay and adjacent to the various wharves, within the main commercial maritime centre. It is associated with the famous early merchant, Robert Campbell. No later store of this construction type was built in the area. Although there were extensive storage facilities built during the 1910 to 1920's period, they were of timber construction, generally single-storey, and nothing like this 1884 building.

The ASN Co Building is part of an historical precinct, which includes Cadman's Cottage, the Mariner's Church and the City Coroner's Court that relates strongly to the maritime usage of the precinct and to the history of The Rocks. Designed by one of Australia's prominent Victorian architects the building reflects the boom era in Australia's early shipping companies.

The place has a strong or special association with a person, or group of persons, of importance of cultural or natural history of New South Wales's history.

The former ASN Co warehouse and office building was designed by WW Wardell, an outstanding architect of the nineteenth century who was prolific. He was best known for building churches, including St Mary's Cathedral in Sydney, public buildings, including the Treasury building, the Mint and Government House in Melbourne, banks including the English Scottish and Australian Bank in George St, The Rocks as well as warehouses. The building also has associations with Robert Campbell, the famous early merchant. The building holds strong association with the importance of steam shipping to developing the colony's economy.

The place is important in demonstrating aesthetic characteristics and/or a high degree of creative or technical achievement in New South Wales.

The architectural style is a rare intact example of the Pre-Federation Anglo Dutch style.

Wardell allowed the site shape to partially dominate his design, which is an excellent example of his style. Each bay was a different length, stepping down the site. Although there were other buildings of similar style that existed in Sydney, none of them incorporate such picturesque facades with this type of layout nor do they mix office and warehouse design together. When it was completed it was one of the most prominent buildings in Sydney, and remains an extremely prominent landmark, being visible from Port Jackson and the North Shore and being part of an important vista from Circular Quay to Campbells Cove and beyond.

It was one of the last substantial warehouses with a timber structural system built in Sydney, from 1885 cast iron columns were used instead of timber.

The architectural style of the building is a rare intact example of the late 19th century Anglo-Dutch style. It is a very rare Victorian example of an office and warehouse development in Sydney. The combination of office and warehouse, each exhibiting the same architectural style to varying degrees, forms a pleasant whole. The importance of steam shipping to the colony's economy is strongly reflected through the high architectural style and the prominent waterfront location of the building. The streetscape inspired by the ASN Co Building is one of great interest. When the building was first built, in 1885, it was one of the most prominent buildings in Sydney, due to its size, location on the Quay, and its architectural style, particularly the clock tower. Today, the building remains a prominent landmark in the panorama of Sydney Cove. It forms part of an important vista from Circular Quay to Campbell's Cove and beyond. The construction method of the building is possibly the earliest example of the use in Sydney of the steam cranes imported from England, which transported materials on site.

The building includes highly significant remnants of one of Sydney's first fire sprinkler installations. Their continued use indicates the soundness of the original design. The integration with successive 1929, 1949/50s and 1970s components represents the evolution of sprinklers.

The place has a strong or special association with a particular community or cultural group in New South Wales for social, cultural or spiritual reasons.

The building is significant as a Landmark building, from its original construction to the present day in Sydney. It holds significance in its associations with The Rocks, Campbell Cove and Circular Quay and is part of a historical precinct that includes Cadmans Cottage, Mission to Seaman Chapel and the Sailors Home which together strongly illustrate this former maritime neighbourhood. It contributes strongly to the character of The Rocks and is an area that is well visited by residents and tourists. Its inclusion on the registers of the National Trust and the National Estate demonstrate the esteem the building is held in by the broader community.

The place has potential to yield information that will contribute to an understanding of the cultural or natural history of New South Wales.

The easily comprehended structural system is an outstanding example of typical commercial building construction in New South Wales from the mid- nineteenth century onwards. The next structural development was the introduction of internal cast iron columns from about 1885 onwards.

The building holds architectural and historical significance due to its physical structure, which includes an early automatic sprinkler system. As a rare surviving example of a hybrid office and warehouse layout, it illustrates the structural relationship between industrial design and function.

The place possesses uncommon, rare or endangered aspects of the cultural or natural history of New South Wales.

The column-to-beam connections of the structural frame, which represent an elegant marriage of timber and cast iron building technique, is an unusual, but efficient-looking method, which does not seem to exist elsewhere in Sydney. The architectural style of the building is a rare intact example of the late 19th century Anglo-Dutch style. It is a very rare and fine Victorian example of and office and warehouse development in Sydney. It is a very rare and fine Victorian example of an office and warehouse development in Sydney. The architectural style is a rare intact example of the Pre-Federation Anglo Dutch style. The construction method of the building is possibly the earliest surviving example of the use in Sydney of steam cranes imported from England.

It is possible that the sprinkler system is a rare surviving example, with cast iron pipework and 1929 sprinkler heads still intact. The remaining early sprinkler pipework is probably part of the original sprinkler system, possibly being installed when the water tower was constructed between 1892 and 1894.

The place is important in demonstrating the principal characteristics of a class of cultural or natural places/environments in New South Wales.

ASN Co Building is one of the last substantial warehouses with timber structural system built in Sydney. The joinery detailing in the office building is a fine example of Victorian detailing and the staircase is an early example of this style of architecture.

== See also ==
- Australian non-residential architectural styles
- Campbell's Stores
