= Sydney Cove railings =

Sydney Cove Railings
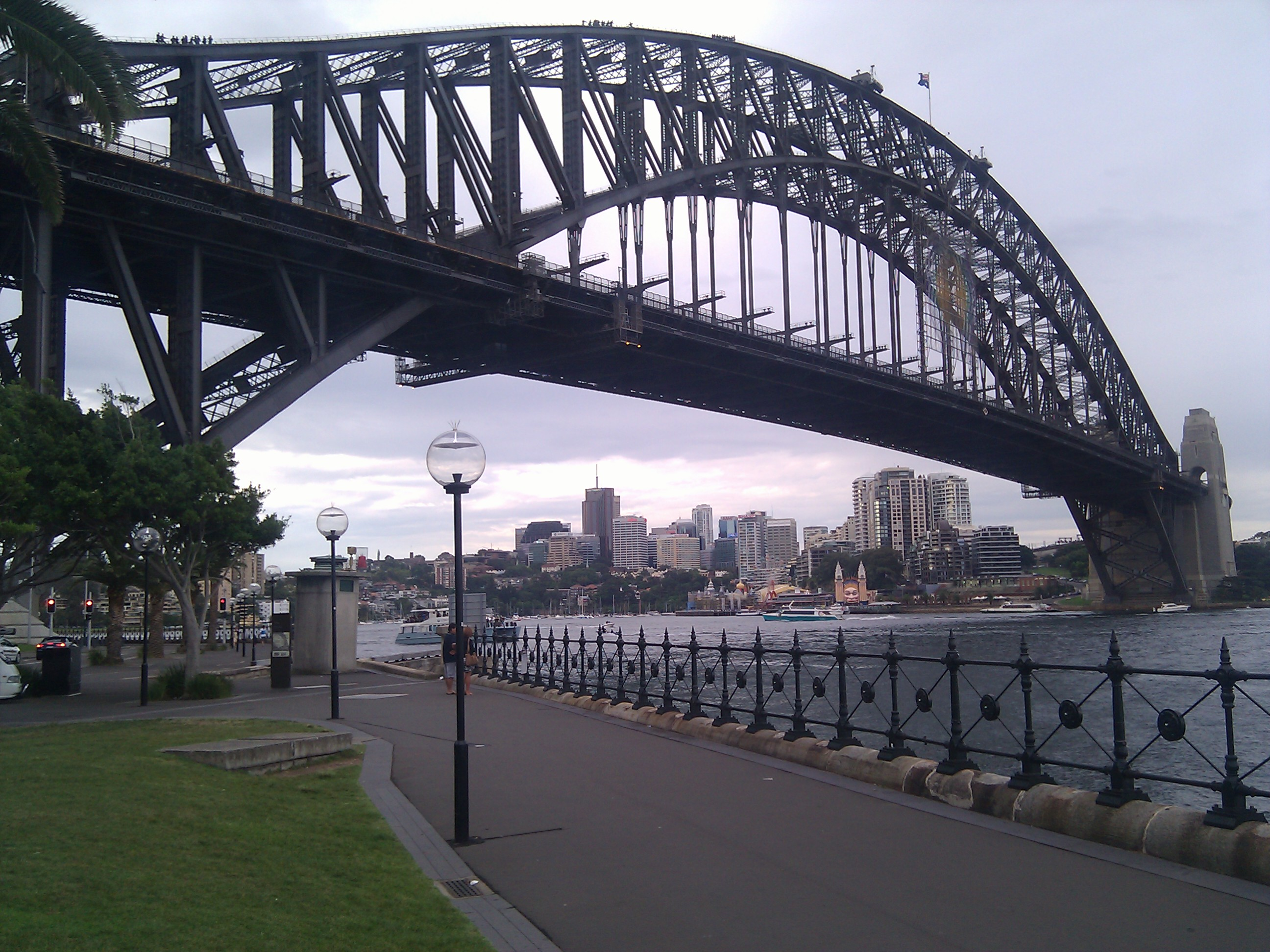
- The railings under the southern arch of the Sydney Harbour Bridge near their western boundary, at Dawes Point

- Location within Sydney Location within Australia
- 33.8603°S 151.2096°E
- Location: Circular Quay Concourse, Circular Quay East and West, from Dawes Point, The Rocks to the Sydney central business district, City of Sydney, New South Wales, Australia

History
- Built: 1900–

Site notes
- Owner: Property NSW

New South Wales Heritage Register
- Official name: Railings, Sydney Cove; Part of Sydney Cove
- Type: State heritage (built)
- Designated: 10 May 2002
- Reference no.: 1572
- Type: Streetscape
- Category: Urban Area

The Sydney Cove railings are heritage-listed railings located at the Circular Quay concourse, Circular Quay east and west, in the inner city Sydney suburbs of Dawes Point, The Rocks and the CBD, in the City of Sydney local government area of New South Wales, Australia. These were built from 1900. The railings were added to the New South Wales State Heritage Register on 10 May 2002.

== History ==
The railings and sandstone gate posts are relics of the main steamer wharf and previous schemes of improvement to Circular Quay. They are some of the last remaining from the 19th century.

Railings of this pattern are shown on an historic photograph dated 1894-98, continuing from Circular Quay around to Circular Quay West. The configuration of both Circular Quay and Circular Quay West have changed since that date, which would have involved the moving of sections of the railings. As well, additional railings of the same pattern were made as part of the Circular Quay improvement works for the 1988 Bicentennial. Identification of the location of the original railings requires further research and should be clearly recorded. A different railing pattern featuring seahorses has been used along Circular Quay Concourse to the end of Wharf 2, when the same pattern used at Circular Quay West is used along the sea wall at East Circular Quay, terminating at Whalebridge. It is noted that the same railing pattern has also been used at Pyrmont Point Park and Jones Bay, c. 1996.

The railings were introduced as part of various schemes for urban improvements in the late 19th and early 20th century, by the Sydney Harbour Trust at the turn of the century, by the Maritime Services Board at the time of refurbishment of the ferry wharves and building of the Cahill Expressway in the 1950s-60s, and for the 1988 Bicentennial.

== Description ==
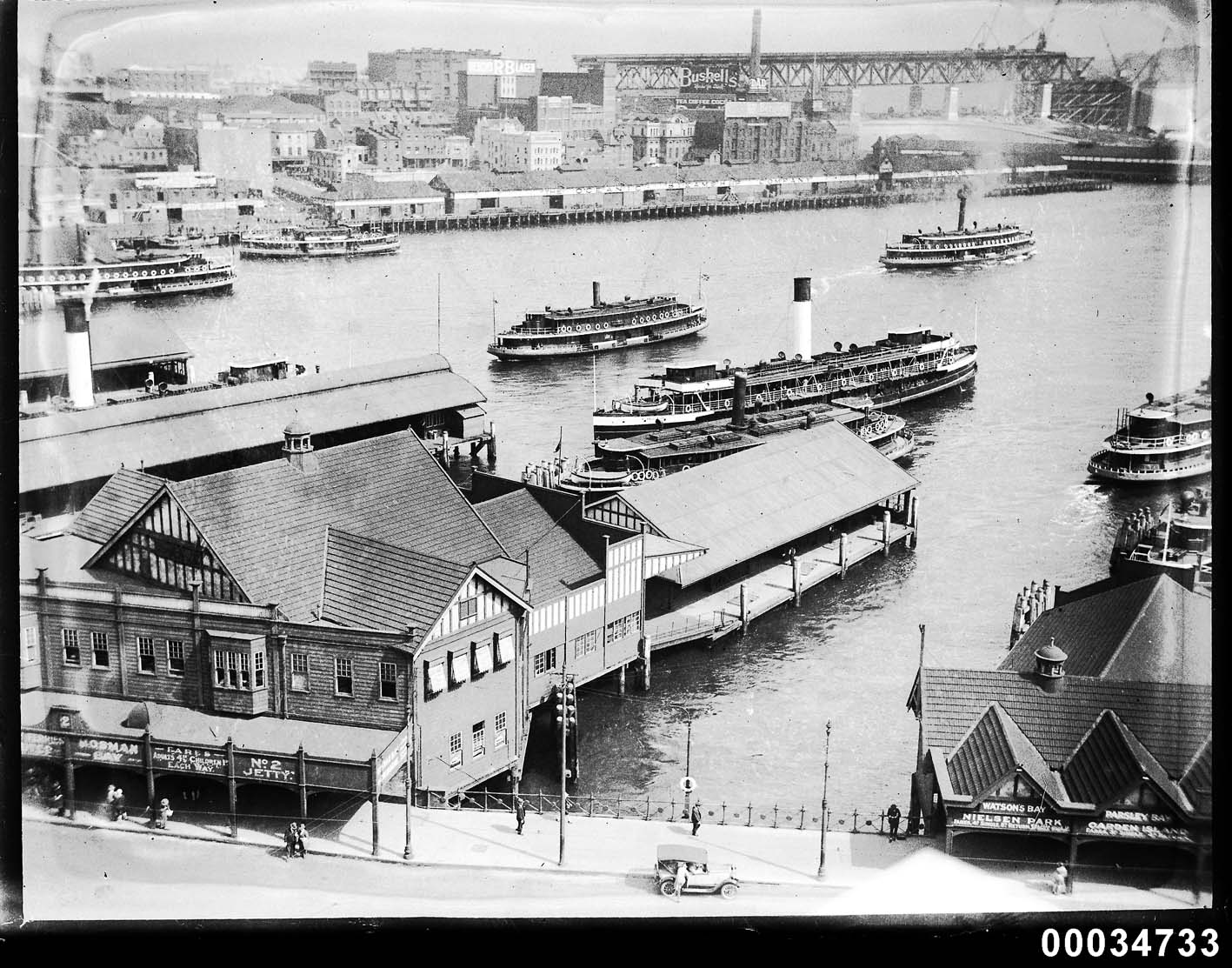
Circular Quay ferry wharf with the railings in the foreground, 1926

Much of the sea wall at Sydney Cove is edged by cast iron fencing comprising vertical posts of two alternating patterns joined by horizontal railings at top and bottom with diagonal bracing and a central medallion at the cross point between. This fencing continues from around Dawes Point to the north boundary of the Park Hyatt Hotel, and continues, interrupted by the decking in front of the Park Hyatt Hotel, the fencing and gates to Campbell's Wharf and then the open area in front of Campbell's Stores and by the Overseas Passenger Terminal. It continues again past the palisade gates, fencing and gateposts to the south of the Terminal, along Circular Quay West to the main concourse giving access to the ferry wharves, and resumes at Circular Quay East, terminating at Whalebridge.

The posts are of cast iron while the rails are in steel. The fencing was reproduced and extended for the improvements undertaken in the 1988 Bicentennial. In addition, when they were damaged they were replaced over the years.

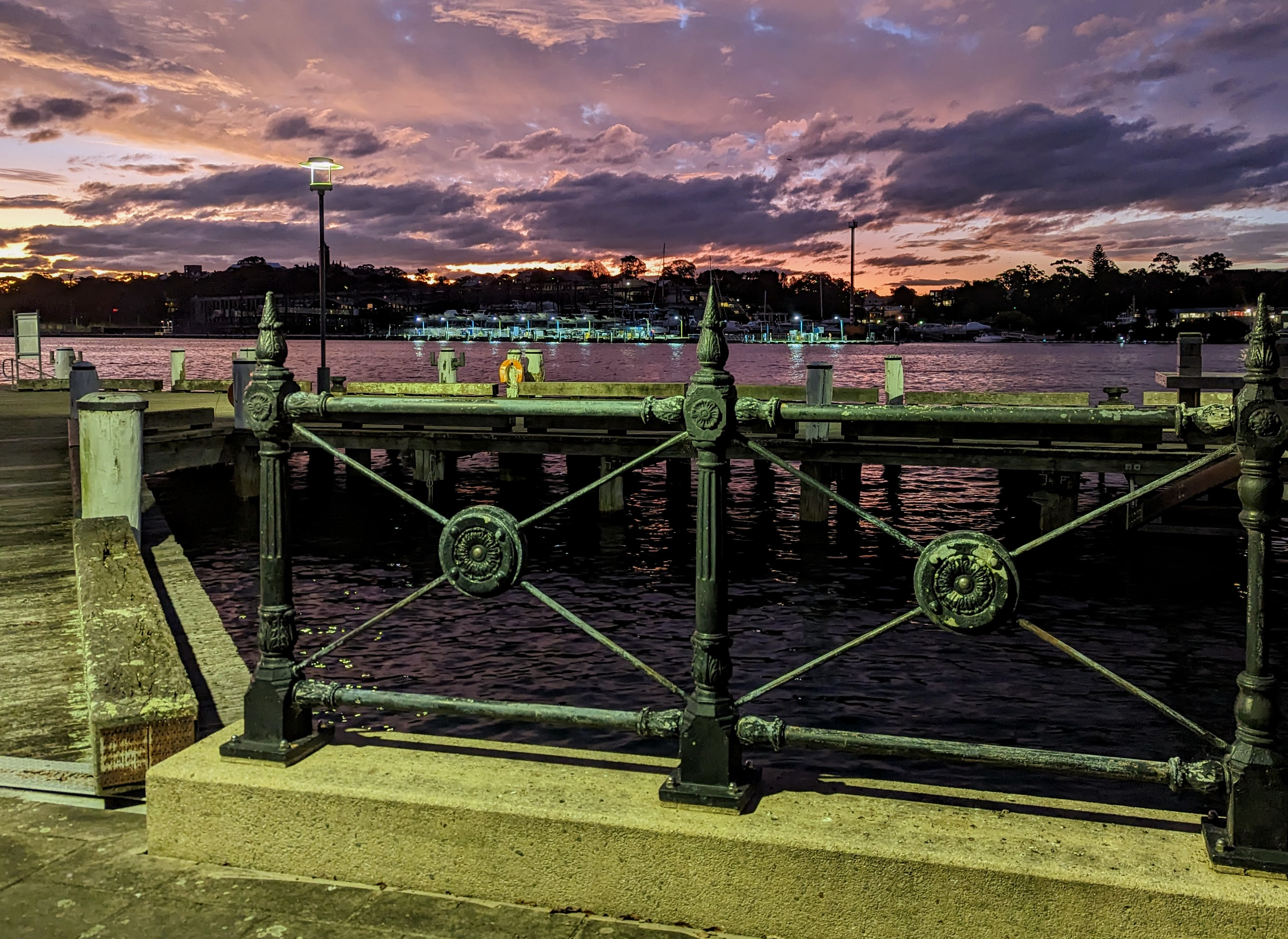
Piramma Park (aka Pyrmont Point Park) railings, the same design as Sydney Cove railings

It is noted that the same railing pattern has been used in the fencing at Pyrmont Point Park, completed in 1997. The Circular Quay Concourse has a different style of fencing with smaller posts and vertical railings enclosed by horizontal railings at the top and bottom, with the top two horizontal rails decorated by a sea horse set in a circle motif. It is noted that sea horses form part of the ironwork decorative scheme of the railway station at Circular Quay. These railings continue along the concourse and return for 2–3 metres (6 ft 7 in – 9 ft 10 in) at the access to each ferry wharf.

=== Modifications and dates ===
Since c. 1900: Constant replacement of damaged sections of railings.

=== Further information ===
Further research should be undertaken regarding the dates of introduction of the two types of fencing, and of the location of the original sections of fence.

== Heritage listing ==
As at 31 March 2011, the Sydney Cover railings and site are of State heritage significance for their historical and scientific cultural values. The site and building are also of State heritage significance for their contribution to The Rocks area which is of State Heritage significance in its own right. The railings have historic significance as part of the urban improvements undertaken at Sydney Cove at two phases: by the Sydney Harbour Trust as part of its urban improvements at the turn of the century, and by the Maritime Services Board at Circular Quay Concourse as part of the refurbishment of the Wharves in the 1950s. They are aesthetically significant as prominent and attractive urban features of the Cove.

Sydney Cove railings was listed on the New South Wales State Heritage Register on 10 May 2002 having satisfied the following criteria.

The place is important in demonstrating the course, or pattern, of cultural or natural history in New South Wales.

The railings have historic significance as part of the urban improvements undertaken at Sydney Cove in different phases: by the Sydney Harbour Trust as part of its urban improvements at the turn of the century, and by the Maritime Services Board at Circular Quay Concourse as part of the refurbishment of the Wharves in the 1950s.

The place is important in demonstrating aesthetic characteristics and/or a high degree of creative or technical achievement in New South Wales.

The railings are aesthetically significant as prominent and attractive urban features of the Cove.
