= ASNC =

ASNC may refer to:

- American Society of Nuclear Cardiology
- Australasian Steam Navigation Company
- Department of Anglo-Saxon, Norse and Celtic, University of Cambridge
