= Mariners' Church, The Rocks =

Mariners' Church
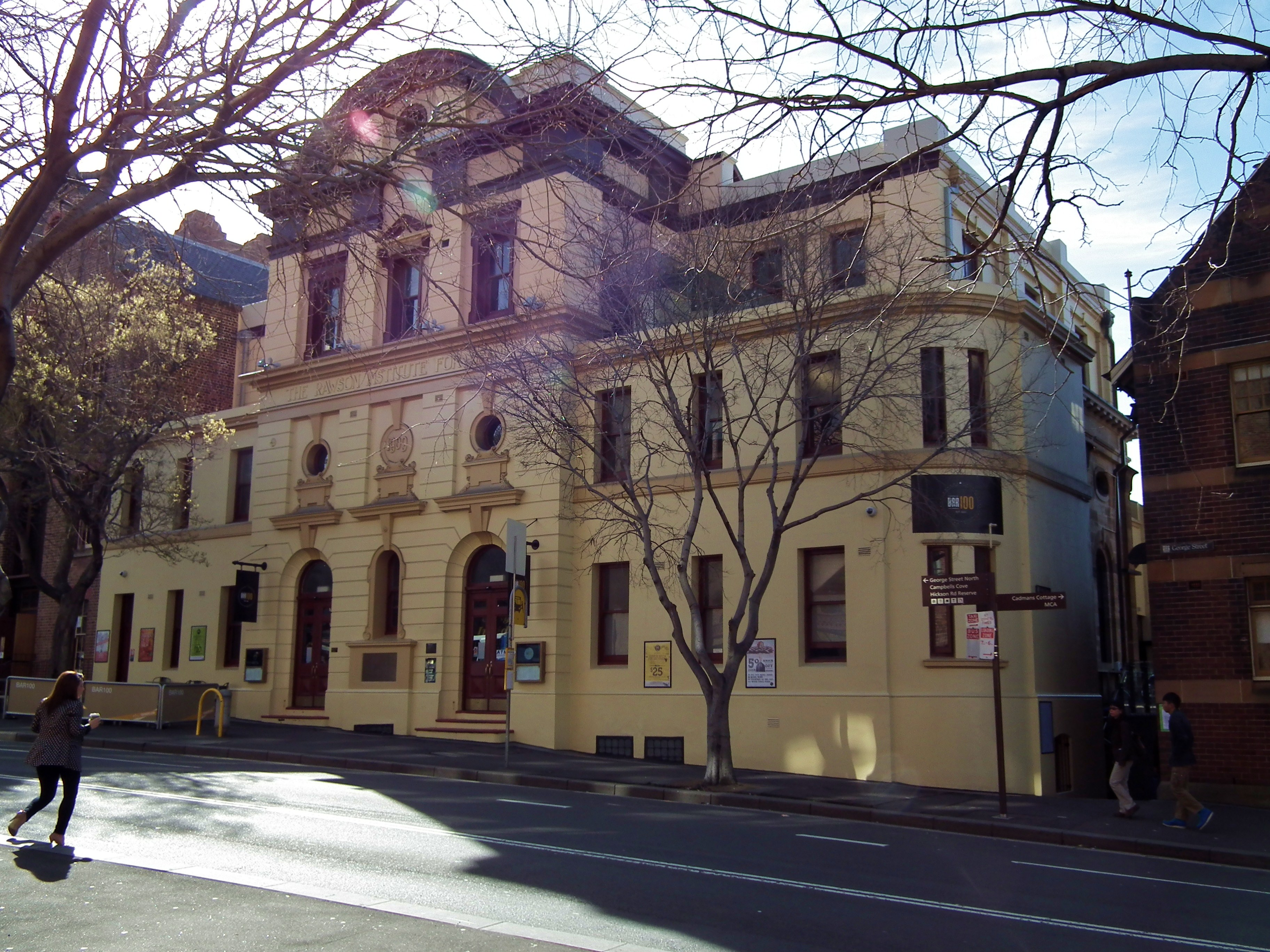
- The building in 2012

- Location within Sydney Location within Australia
- 33.8582°S 151.2094°E
- Location: 98–100 George Street, The Rocks, City of Sydney, New South Wales, Australia

History
- Built: 1856–1859

Site notes
- Architects: J. Bibb (1856); H. C. Kent (1909); Kent & Massie (1927)
- Architectural styles: Victorian Free Classical; Federation Free Classical; Inter-War Mediterranean or Romanesque
- Owner: Sydney Harbour Foreshore Authority

New South Wales Heritage Register
- Official name: Mariners' Church; Mission to Seamen; Rawson Institute for Seamen & Mariners' Church; Craft Centre
- Type: State heritage (built)
- Designated: 10 May 2002
- Reference no.: 1559
- Type: Barracks & housing
- Category: Defence

The Mariners' Church is a heritage-listed former church and seamen's mission and now nightclub, bar and restaurant located at 98–100 George Street in the inner city Sydney suburb of The Rocks in the City of Sydney local government area of New South Wales, Australia. It was designed in various stages by J. Bibb, H. C. Kent and Kent & Massie and was built from 1856 to 1859. It is also known as Mission to Seamen; Rawson Institute for Seamen & Mariners' Church; Craft Centre. The property is owned by Sydney Harbour Foreshore Authority, an agency of the Government of New South Wales. It was added to the New South Wales State Heritage Register on 10 May 2002. The building was previously a cafe, place of worship and craft centre.

== History ==
The site is one of the most historic in Australia. The first occupant was Lieutenant Ball of the First Fleet vessel HMS Supply (1759) in 1788, and after the waterfront part of the hospital site to the south was set aside as a Dockyard, Thomas Moore, the Master Boat Builder, built a house where Ball's house and garden had been. The neighbouring land to the north was first owned by William Balmain, but by 1800 had passed to Robert Campbell.

The Bethel Union originated in England, in the Port of London. Its founding was part of the widespread evangelical religious revival of the early 19th century, of which missionary activity among seamen was becoming a part. In 1822, the Bethel Seamen's Union or Bethel Union was established in Sydney. Two earlier sites were granted to the Union, one at Darling Harbour near Erskine Street where a church was erected in 1844, the second at south east Circular Quay where the church operated out of a temporary building for 6 years, before the third site, the former Master Boat Builder's house site at West Circular Quay, was granted in 1856 following representations from the Union for a site in this area, the centre of maritime activity in Sydney.

The Bethel Union's third church was designed by John Bibb, in the Victorian Free Classical style, built of well-executed sandstone ashlar, with a slate roof. Construction continued throughout 1856 & 1857. Then work stopped through lack of funds. During construction, the stonemasons union advised of the reduction of their working hours per day from 12 to 8. This was agreed by the Bethel Union Trustees and thus the site was the first to employ stonemasons on an 8-hour day in Sydney. On 27 February 1859 the Mariners' Church was opened. The building is of high architectural and historical importance, and the original church is a grand space and a rare and precious reminder of an expansive early Victorian preaching auditorium.

Early attendance was low, but after Rev. Thomas Gainsford took office in 1871, attendance soared, and in 1873 more accommodation was provided by the excavation of some 460 cubic metres (16,000 cu ft) of sandstone to create a basement providing a hall for concerts and dining, a smoking room, and a library. In 1888, the basement was enlarged, a smoking room added to the library, and a gymnasium created. Around this time the Bethel Union was in financial difficulties, and eventually, in 1895, the Mariners' Church was leased to the Missions to Seamen, an organisation originating in England in 1835, and starting in Sydney with the work of John Shearston in 1872. In his missionary work for neglected seamen he initially provided church services but was soon providing for their wider needs, including reading rooms and clubs, education and welfare services.

The two organisations combined functions and prospered, The facilities were considered inadequate, and the Governor, Sir Harry Rawson instigated extensions which were carried out in 1910, and the complex was renamed The Rawson Institute for Seamen. The alterations were designed by William Kent in Federation Free Classical style. The closure of Bethel Street and the creation of the Bethel Steps to replace it enabled a larger site. An extra storey was added with four columns to support the beam structure of the upper floor which consisted of a central chapel with compartments on either side. Kent added rooms to the George Street facade which were in the Federation Free Classical style, converting the façade into a three-storey ensemble. The south front rooms curved around the boundary of the Bethel Steps. The activities of the Institute continued to expand and Dame Margaret Davidson, wife of the new Governor, launched an appeal for the further enlargement of 1927-28 called the Dame Margaret Davidson Wing designed by the architects Kent and Massie. In 1931 the Bethel Union Trustees approved an extension of the lease to the end of 1960, and a new dwelling for the Mission Chaplain was built.

In 1971 the Mariners' Church complex was resumed by the Sydney Cove Redevelopment Authority (SCRA) and the Bethel Union was relocated to Flying Angel House, 11-15 Macquarie Place, opened in 1977. The SCRA then adapted the building for the Craft Council of NSW which operated from 1981 to 1990 when the building was vacated to make way for The Story of Sydney, and the Craft Centre moved to No 88 George Street.

The Story of Sydney opened in January 1991 and closed on 31 January 1992, as it proved not to be a financially viable project.

The Mariners' Church building was being used as an art gallery and cafe, the gallery moved out in 2006. Currently the building is being completely renovated and stonework restored for fitting out as a restaurant and nightclub. Part of these works were excavation into the 1909 extension to fit plant into a basement. This exposed the top courses of a retaining wall and Sydney Harbour Foreshore Authority archaeologists were called in to excavate. The almost complete remains of Bethel St were uncovered in the new basement. A viewing window was cut into the wall at Bethel Stairs and interpretation of Bethel St and the building is to be installed.

The Mariners Church was originally built in 1854, extended in 1873, 1908–9, 1921 and 1927. The site had previously been that of the boat builders house and garden, part of the Government Boatyard which also encompassed Cadmans Cottage to the south.

== Description ==
The first John Bibb structure was built in Victorian Free Classical style in temple form, resulting in a single large prismatic volume with two projecting wings with a cruciform plan symmetrical about two axes. The elevations have a high piano nobile (main floor) four pediments and carved foliated decoration. The 1909 alterations were designed by Harry Chambers Kent in Federation Free Classical style. The closure of Bethel Street and the creation of the Bethel Steps to replace it enabled a larger site. An extra storey was added with four columns to support the beam structure of the upper floor which consisted of a central chapel with compartments on either side. Kent added rooms to the George Street facade which were in the Federation Free Classical style, converting the facade into a three-storey ensemble. The south front rooms curved around the boundary of the Bethel Steps. In 1927 a new chapel was built in the Inter-War Mediterranean or Romanesque style at ground level and a new balcony was erected on a base of retaining walls and piers of cement rendered load bearing brickwork facing Circular Quay West. In 1931 a stone cottage erected 30 years before on the north-east corner of the site was demolished and a new dwelling for the Mission Chaplain was built, designed by N. W. McPherson, which became part of the Davidson Wing, and was not completed until after World War II. The Circular Quay facade had become asymmetrical and idiosyncratic, and concealed almost all of the original Bibb building. In 1980-81 work undertaken on the building to adapt it for the Craft Council included the demolition of the 1931 Chaplaincy addition and part of the 1927-28 addition. A staircase and office were added, and the ground floor chapel became the Craft Centre, the basement a gallery. The treatment of the three chapels was sympathetic but some adverse work including a new mezzanine in the 1909 chapel were added. In 1990, the work, consisting of some conservation and careful adaptation work, undertaken for the Story of Sydney, was in general benign. The exteriors were improved, and a terrace was added which improved the West Circular Quay facade.

The church was architecturally styled in 1856 in the Victorian Free Classical; in 1909 in the Federation Free Classical; and in 1927 in the Inter-War Mediterranean or Romanesque. The church has three storeys, a galvanised iron roof; and flooring that comprises terracotta tiles, concrete and bituminous felt.

In 2008 a complete refurbishment of the building was undertaken, this included replacement of degraded stonework and excavation under the 1909 extension. This excavation revealed the almost complete remains of Bethel St and included a large retaining wall.

=== Condition ===
As at 3 May 2001, Archaeological Assessment Condition: Watching brief- mostly disturbed. Assessment Basis: In general it was concluded that although sub-floor deposits had been grossly disturbed by the various post-1854 building phases, the back section of the building, incorporating the Margaret Davidson Wing, contained potentially useful data at the former inter-tidal zone, some 3 metres below the current surface. Investigation: Watching brief

Archaeology: watching brief- partly disturbed. 2008 excavation for liftwell and under the 1910 extension which revealed an almost complete Bethel St

=== Modifications and dates ===
1873; 1909; 1927; 1931; 1940; 1947 (for detailed information see the Conservation Plan & above in description). 2008 complete refurbishment

== Heritage listing ==
As at 30 March 2011, The Mariners' Church and site are of State heritage significance for their historical and scientific cultural values. The site and building are also of State heritage significance for their contribution to The Rocks area which is of State Heritage significance in its own right.

The former Mariners' Church occupies an historic site and itself has association with the Age of Victorian enlightenment, reflected in the establishment of the Bethel Union and Rawson Institute for Seamen, and in changes in approaches to the welfare of seamen evidenced by the building fabric. The evolving complex is also associated with a number of prominent individuals including Lancelot Threlkeld, Governor Sir Henry Rawson, Sir James Fairfax, Dame Margaret Davidson and the architects John Bibb and Harry C. Kent and his partners. The existing Mariners' Church complex is an important streetscape element in a major historic precinct and its buildings display characteristics of the highest aesthetic calibre, including fine details and use of two applications of the Free Classical style - one early Victorian, the other Federation. The fabric of the Mariners' Church evidences high quality workmanship and early use of steel technology and illustrates subsequent application of conservation values and principles.

The site is also significant in the industrial relations history of NSW as it was the first site to be awarded an eight-hour day for stonemasons, the first tradesmen to be granted it.

Mariners' Church was listed on the New South Wales State Heritage Register on 10 May 2002 having satisfied the following criteria.

The place is important in demonstrating the course, or pattern, of cultural or natural history in New South Wales.

The site is highly significant for its historical and occupational associations with The Rocks and the maritime nature of Sydney, including the early Dockyard and Robert Campbell's house and waterside warehouse. The present physical relationship of the group of buildings including the Mariners' Church/Rawson Institute, the ASN Building, the Sailor's Home and Cadman's Cottage, evokes this history. The building is one of the symbols of early Victorian enlightenment in The Rocks. The original Chapel represented the impact of religion and welfare in the lives of visiting seamen. It is important in the history of architecture in Australia, and provides evidence of the choice of Classical styles for non conformist Protestant church buildings. The original building signifies the impact of the Bethel Union, while the Rawson Institute demonstrates that of the Missions to Seamen. The adjoining Bethel Steps is the successor to the earlier Bethel Street. The original building and the George Street façade and other exteriors are important examples of the work of the significant architects John Bibb (early to mid 19th century) and Harry C. Kent (Federation period) respectively. The complex is important for its association with many people of historical importance.

The place has a strong or special association with a person, or group of persons, of importance of cultural or natural history of New South Wales's history.

The evolving complex is also associated with a number of prominent individuals including Lancelot Threlkeld, Governor Sir Henry Rawson, Sir James Fairfax, Dame Margaret Davidson and the architects John Bibb and Harry C. Kent and his partners.

The place is important in demonstrating aesthetic characteristics and/or a high degree of creative or technical achievement in New South Wales.

The former Mariners' Church is a fine early example of the Victorian Free Classical style of architecture in the form, space and surviving detail of the first chapel. The extensions completed in 1909 are a good and representative example of Federation Free Classical architecture, and are an ingenious solution to a difficult design problem. The exteriors, in particular the George St. facade, illustrate many of the essentials of that style. The 1909 and 1927 Chapels are finely detailed interiors, the first with an interesting Baroque quality, the second an Inter-War Mediterranean or Romanesque style. It forms an effective streetscape component of George Street North, and Circular Quay West, with the corner curve into Bethel Steps, which forms another important streetscape element. The building occupies a key location at the confluence of Hickson Road and George Street and has a landmark quality being at the crown of a slight rise, providing a focus for a variety of spatial vistas and even different levels of views.

The place has a strong or special association with a particular community or cultural group in New South Wales for social, cultural or spiritual reasons.

The building characterises and illustrates in its present fabric the changes in approaches to welfare among seamen, from the mainly religious endeavours expressed in the first Chapel to the more diverse recreational and educational approaches expressed in the progressively enlarged complex. The construction of the building is associated with the first application in Sydney of the principle of the eight-hour working day and thus with the early influence of the trade union movement. Its resumption and adaptation by the Sydney Cove Redevelopment Authority for use as a Craft Centre and later adaptations for the Story of Sydney and then for gallery shop and cafe uses represent a continuation of a semi-public uses and the application of 1970s, 1980s and 1990s conservation values.

The place has potential to yield information that will contribute to an understanding of the cultural or natural history of New South Wales.

The first Mariners' Church is a good example of traditional masonry construction, displaying fine workmanship and detailing, including different kinds of ashlar tooling as well as the use of shell-lime mortar. The early use of imported iron windows adds to its technical interest. The insertion of the basement (now level 2) some years after the completion of the Mariners' Church was a bold enlargement of the available space of the building. The interpolation of riveted steel structural members in 1908-09 is a fairly early example of this type of structure. The ensembles of pressed metal ceilings are significant for their size, consistency and intactness. The eastern portion of the site is known to contain archaeological deposits with potential to yield information about the use of this site and of the history of The Rocks.

== See also ==
- Australian non-residential architectural styles
