= Campbell's Stores =

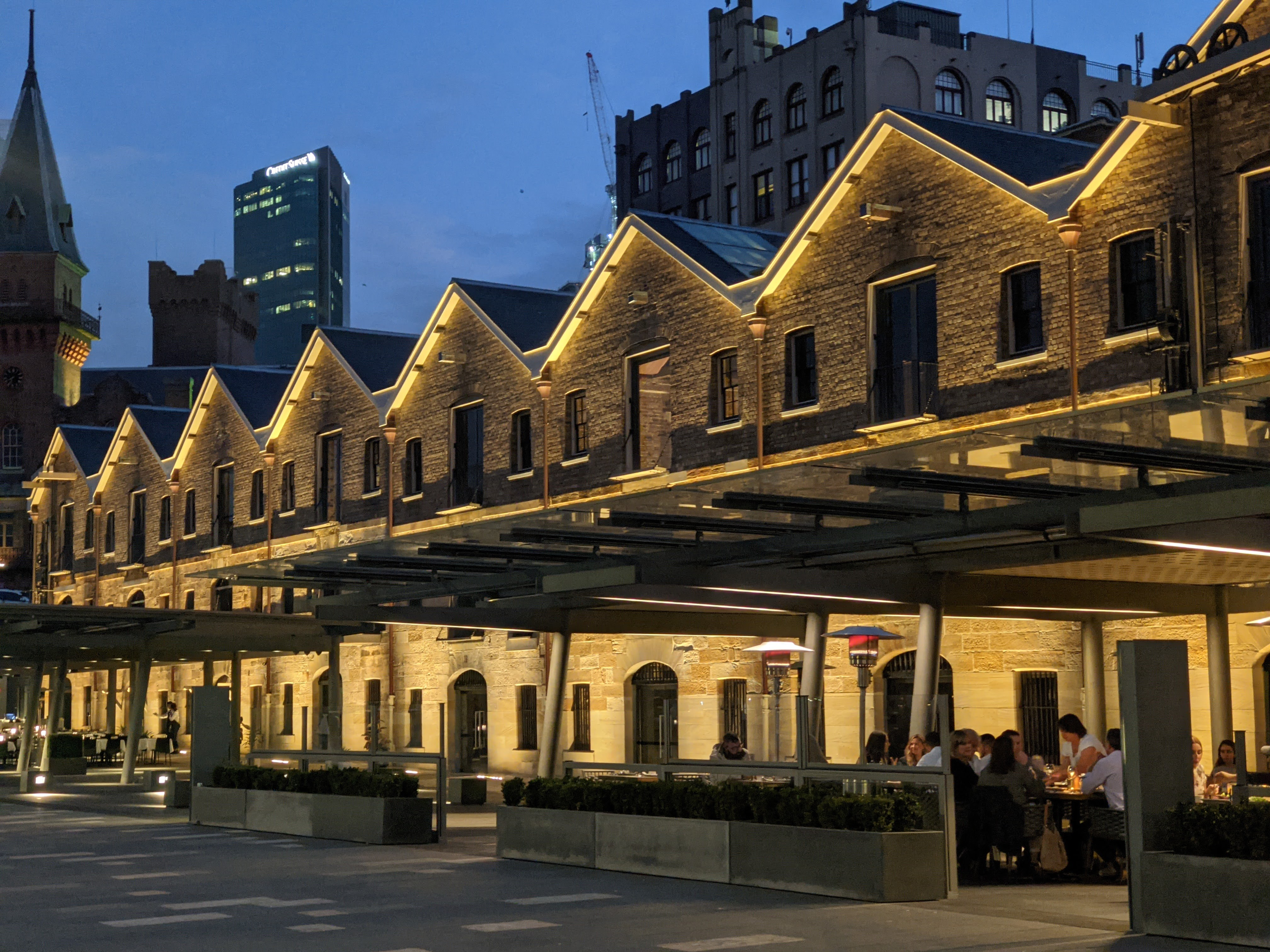
- Campbell's Stores, pictured in 2021

- Location within Sydney Location within Australia
- 33.8570°S 151.2092°E
- Location: 7–27 Circular Quay West, The Rocks, City of Sydney, New South Wales, Australia

History
- Built: 1850–1861

Site notes
- Architectural style: Victorian Georgian
- Owner: Sydney Harbour Foreshore Authority
- Website: campbellsstores.com.au

New South Wales Heritage Register
- Official name: Campbell's Stores; Old Metcalfe Bond (Campbells ); Campbells Store
- Type: State heritage (built)
- Designated: 10 May 2002
- Reference no.: 1536
- Type: Warehouse/storage area
- Category: Maritime Industry

The Campbell's Stores is a heritage-listed former warehouse building in the inner city Sydney suburb of The Rocks, New South Wales, Australia. The Victorian Georgian building previously served as store houses and maritime bonded warehouses. It was built from 1850 to 1861. It faces Campbells Cove, an inlet in the north-west of Sydney Cove. In the 1970s, along with the general decline of commercial shipping activities in Sydney Cove, the building was converted for use as tourist-orientated restaurants and bars.

It is also known as Old Metcalfe Bond; Campbells Store. The property is owned by the Sydney Harbour Foreshore Authority, an agency of the Government of New South Wales. It was added to the New South Wales State Heritage Register on 10 May 2002.

The lease to the building is held by private hospitality company Tallawoladah Pty Ltd. From 2015 to 2018, the leaseholder undertook a refurbishment costing A$32 million. Restaurants began opening in the refurbished building from autumn 2019.

== History ==
Robert Campbell was born in Scotland, and went to India in 1798 to join his elder brother in the Calcutta business partnership of Campbell and Co. The firm had sent a speculative cargo to Sydney Cove in 1796. Robert Campbell followed in 1798, with another cargo. He bought land at Dawes Point overlooking Sydney Cove from John Baughan and commenced trading gradually building up a reputation as a shrewd but honest merchant.

In September 1801, he married Sophia Palmer, sister of John Palmer, who became Commissary of New South Wales. By November 1801, some of Campbell's Storehouses were complete, as was a stone wall and small wharf at right angles to the main warehouse. It was claimed to be the first privately owned wharf in Australia. In 1802, Campbell and Sophia moved into Wharf House which was then incomplete. Beneath their house, vaults to store goods were excavated in the sandstone rock face. John Lewin's watercolour of 1808 showed the jetty completed out from the vaults, a two-storey storehouse and an access road to Wharf House running behind this jetty.

Governor Lachlan Macquarie was anxious to grant land to settlers who were building large and substantial improvements on their Sydney leases. Hence on 29 June 1814, Robert Campbell was granted 3 acres, 3 roods, bounded on the south by the premises occupied by the Naval Officer, on the southwest by a road leading to Dawes Point Battery, and on the east by Sydney Cove, "in consequence of his having erected thereon several large and expensive Buildings". A right to make streets was reserved to the Crown.

In May 1807, Campbell had been appointed Naval Officer and a magistrate. As a result of his sympathy for Governor Bligh, he was marked for persecution by the rebel administration after Bligh was deposed. Campbell was later restored to full control of his business by the arrival of Governor Macquarie in 1810, but he was forced to leave it in the hands of Charles Hook, when he went back to Britain to give evidence at the trials following the rebellion. He returned on 18 March 1815 to find his business bankrupt and many of his ships wrecked. He sought compensation from the government. Campbell operated as a commission agent until he was able to operate as merchant again. On 4 January 1822 Campbell formally received compensation from the government for the loss of his ships while he was in England from 1812–15. He built warehouses along the edge of the water, they were all complete by 1825 and they are shown in Stewart's 1825 copy of Harper's map of 1823. These are not the subject Campbell's Stores.

Robert Campbell, senior, signed a partnership agreement with his sons who were gradually coming into the management of the firm in 1828. By about 1830 his son, John Campbell, had virtually taken over the business. Equipment for the wharf was also acquired. The Magistrates Returns of Manufactories, Mill etc, in 1831 showed Robert Campbell senior, of Campbell's Wharf, has one hydraulic pump at wharf. By 1838, R Campbell & Co was listed as possessing one crane.

John Campbell officially took over as head of the firm in 1836, when it was in financial difficulty. On 6 May 1836, Campbell's Wharf was advertised for sale in the press. It was followed by an injunction to prevent the sale of Campbell's Wharf shortly afterwards. Whatever further action was necessary seems to have been successful, since the wharf remained in the hands of the Campbell family.

Although control of the firm was largely in the hands of Campbell's sons, the title to the land on which the wharf was situated was in Robert's name, and so he continued to be involved in matters regarding the land. On 21 January 1841 Robert Campbell formally applied to the Colonial Secretary for permission to enlarge part of his wharf so that ships could unload at low tide, by using a large rock which could not be removed by dredging as the foundation for the enlargement of the wharf. The Colonial Engineer, George Barney, minuted that he could find no objection to the enlargement of the wharf. Over the years, the area of Campbell's Wharf increased as more land was reclaimed.

On 29 June 1843, Robert Campbell senior, of George Street, Sydney, mortgaged the wharf to The Australian Trust Company for £10,000 for three years with interest. The area was specified as being 3 acres 3 roods as in the 1814 grant. The need to mortgage the wharf indicated two alternative strategies being applied by the family to their interest. One was that they were mobilising all their available assets for improvements to their property and business to create a better liquidity. Alternatively, the dating of the mortgage, in the wake of one of the most devastating financial depressions in early Australia, may indicate an attempt to salvage their business using their land as a source of working capital. Whatever the reason for the initial mortgage, it was renewed again and again in following decades, so that the Campbell family did not hold complete equity in the wharf again. There eventually appears to have been some dispute between the Campbells and later mortgagees who took over the loan in later years. Only in 1877, after taking the matter to the Supreme Court, were the Campbells to regain possession of Campbell's Wharf again.

Robert Campbell senior was not to know anything of these travails regarding the wharf. On 11 October 1845, he drew up his will leaving his property in six parts to be divided amongst his sons John, Robert, Charles, George, and daughter Sophia Ives Campbell and Arthur Jeffreys, the husband of his daughter, Sarah. On 15 April 1846, Robert Campbell senior died at Duntroon.

The first rate assessment of the City of Sydney taken in 1845 showed the following structures on Campbell's Wharf: a house, stores, warehouse and wharf valued at £1,000. At the "north end of Campbell & Co wharf" were three stores plus an office and store, all of three storeys, with slate roofs, valued at £150 each, two of which were vacant and two occupied by Smith and Campbell. Additionally, there was a cottage for the overseer George Atherden, and an empty timber woolshed. The stores identified here appear to be the older stone stores on the waterfront built in the 1820s and not the subject stores which were constructed in the early 1850s. Between 25 August 1851 and 27 September 1852, the Sydney City Council Rate Assessment Book shows that on Campbell's Wharf, J Campbell had added five stores which were built of stone, with slate roofs, all provisionally assessed at a net value per annum of £30. These are the first five bays of Campbell's Stores.

The 1858 Rate Assessment Book shows that the three-storey stone warehouses on the water's edge from the 1820s were still extant. Amongst the array of other wharf buildings were five warehouses of stone with slate roofs, built as two storeys with two rooms in them. Three operate as warehouses while two are conducted as a combined warehouse and office, with four rooms. Soon afterwards, construction of additional warehouse bays commenced. A photograph from the MF Moresby Album dated between 1856 and 1860 showed ten bays with the base of the eleventh bay under construction and awaiting its roof, as well as what appear to be construction materials in front of it. The construction of the additional bays is confirmed by the 1861 Rate Assessment Book which shows that a further six bays had been added to the five bays of the warehouse which were extant in 1858, making eleven bays in all. All bays are of two storeys with two rooms in each. This work is further confirmed by the 1865 Trig Survey of Sydney, completed by the City Council as the prelude to constructing sewers.

As construction work on the stores was being completed, Robert Campbell junior died at Duntroon, on 30 March 1859 leaving his elder brother John in charge of the firm.

A wide range of tenants took up warehouse space at Campbell's Wharf, some of them in Campbell's Stores. In 1858-59, Sands Directory lists the following at Campbell's Wharf: Campbell & Co; Sugar Company's stores; JC Dibbs & Co, commission agents and wharfingers; Robert Nash, storekeeper; WH Eldred, Capt, Chili Flour Co; Chilian Consulate - Consul, WH Eldred. In 1861, it shows: Campbell & Co; Colonial Sugar Refining Co, stores; Peruvian guano stores; George Lloyd & Co stores; Robey & Co's stores; George Lewis custom house officer; and WH Eldred, broker & general agent. In 1863, it shows: 4. Merry Willis and Co, merchants; 3. Henry Fisher & Son, sugar factors; 2. Brown & Co, merchants; 1. EM Sayers & Co, merchants; Robert Nash; WH Eldred, merchant; 4. Joseph Kendall, marine surveyor; JA Buttrey & Co, merchants; 5 and 6, Daniel Thacker & Co, merchants; 22 Campbell's stores; and John Campbell, merchant. Commercial tenants continued to occupy the stores. A photograph of 1870 showed the eleven bays of the completed warehouse. As late as 1875, the cemetery which had been established on part of Campbell's land in the 1790s before he took possession of the site was still visible at the rear of the store, where a tombstone of a marine, John Jones, who died in 1792 could be made out.

A description of Campbell's Wharf in November 1875 stated that it had a landing area of 30 metres (100 ft) which was backed by 22 very strong stone stores which, along with two sheds on the wharf, could hold 20,000 tonnes (22,000 short tons). An accompanying engraving based upon some of the extant photographs showed eleven bays of the stores which are two storeys high.

=== Relationship with the Australasian Steam Navigation Company ===
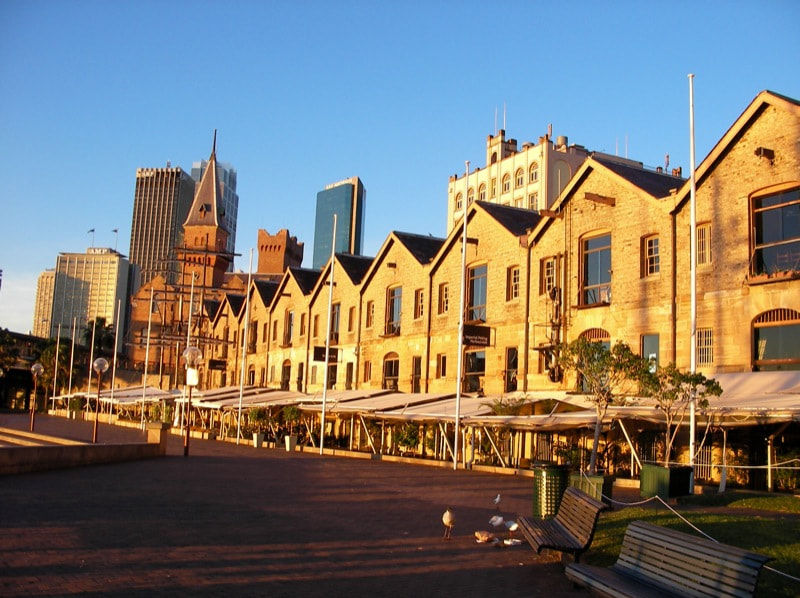
Campbell's Wharf with the ASN Co building in the background, pictured in 2007.

Negotiations for the purchase of Campbell's Wharf by the Australasian Steam Navigation Company (ASN Co.) appear to have been well advanced by early 1876. The company's old wharf at Sussex Street had become too small for its expanding trade and it needed a newer more central one. On 18 February 1876, the company applied to the Minister of Lands to extend Campbell's Wharf, which they had recently purchased, by running out jetties on piles into the harbour. An accompanying diagram showed that they had already reached the specified limit for reclamation from the harbour. Their application was approved on 1 May 1876. A plan was drawn by Surveyor Wansborough of reclaimed land claimed for purchase by ASN Co. on 19 October 1877.

In May 1876, the ASN Co. was stated by the company secretary to have bought Campbell's Wharf for £100,000. Before the sale could be finalised there were some impediments in the title which the Campbells had to eliminate, most notably the outstanding mortgage from June 1843 now held by the Liverpool and London and Globe Insurance Company of Sydney. John Campbell applied for the purchase of reclaimed land in front of Campbell's Wharf, measuring 2 roods 5 perches on 6 January 1877. The plan by JF Mann dated 4 January 1877 which accompanied the application showed the water frontage and some buildings but not Campbell's Stores. The plan showed the original High Water Mark as being in front of the stores. Since no limit had been laid down for the High Water Mark in this area, the application was accepted.

A detailed press report of November 1877 outlined the changes made by the ASN Co. to Campbell's Wharf. It built a new wharf, under the superintendence of Thomas Macredie. A wharf 320 feet long was under construction with two jetties 76 and 107 metres (250 and 350 ft) long. A new road 15 metres (50 ft) wide was planned to join George Street running in front of the Mariner's Church. For construction of the wharfs, turpentine was used for all timber exposed to seawater, while ironbark and other hardwoods were used for the braces, beams and planking. A seawall was built from stone quarried from the company's old works at Pyrmont, as was stone for its new offices. An accompanying illustration showed Campbell's Store with eleven bays and two storeys. A proposal of 1878 to extend George Street North through the land of the ASN Co. appears to have been linked with the development by the company. Between 1877 and 1878, the tenancy of the stores changed. In 1877, they were called 'Campbell's Bonded Stores'. In 1878, the Sands Directory showed the ASN Co.'s wharf here. On the site was "The Metcalfe Bond and Free Stores" with D. Murray as the warehouse keeper. The stores retained the name "Metcalfe Stores" thereafter.

John Campbell was permitted to receive a Grant by Purchase of Reclaimed Land under the Crown Lands Act of 1 acre 1 rood and 22 perches of land reclaimed from Sydney Cove in front of Campbell's Wharf for £100, and the grant was issued on 17 December 1878. On 4 July 1879, he formally transferred title to the reclaimed land to the ASN Co. In October 1879, the Peninsular and Oriental Steam Navigation Company leased the southern part of the wharf at £1,750 per annum. On 15 February 1881, a further lease of part of the wharf to the Peninsular and Oriental Steam Navigation Company was signed.

Parts of the land that had formed Campbell's property were hived off. In January 1880, a strip of land was sold to the City Council for £4,000 to widen George Street North. Land facing George Street was put in the hands of various auctioneers for sale. Richardson & Wrench offered 19 lots between Horse Ferry Road and George Street for sale on 15 October 1880. To the east were shown "Metcalfe Bonded and Free Stores" on the sale plan. The company secretary reported that in May 1881, the ASN Co. had sold 'Campbell's Garden' for £25,000.

The company let the former Campbell's Stores, now known as the Metcalfe Bond Stores, to a variety of tenants. In 1882, J Upward appeared in the Sands Directories as the proprietor of the "Metcalfe Bonded Stores". A photograph of "Metcalfe Bonded and Free Stores" dating from the early 1880s shows J. Upward as the proprietor while the building still had two storeys. When a survey of the area was completed by Charles Bullock for the Surveyor-General in December 1882, his plan showed the buildings as "Bonded and Free Stores" with the Branch Store of the Government Printing Office at the northern end.

In September 1884, the ASN Co. accepted a contract for £30,000 for the building of new offices and four stores on the site of Campbell's old house. The stores known as Campbell's Stores were not demolished, probably since they were still relatively modern in layout and design being then only a little over thirty years old. Probably to enable them to finance the work, the company took out a mortgage on 31 March 1885 to the Australian Mutual Provident Society of their land.

Rather than demolish Campbell's Stores, the company enlarged them. H. P. Dove's plans drawn for insurance companies about 1882 showed the Metcalfe Bond as a two-storey masonry building, with eleven bays, with each divided into two floors, bond or free. When the revisions to these plans were published in 1887, his plans showed the Metcalfe Bond as now being of three floors. It was still of eleven bays, but an extra level to each bay ensured there were three rooms. Interconnecting doors were shown within each group of three bays.

These works were completed before major changes in the ownership of the wharf. By 1886, the ASN Co. had become over-extended due to its efforts to match the competition and prices of its rival shipping firms. A major tactical blunder had been the purchase of Campbell's Wharf and the subsequent cost of rebuilding the wharf. While it allowed the company to make some welcome profits from the capital values of the land, especially from the sale of the strip of land facing George Street, the relocation of the company away from its original base in Darling Harbour took it away from the hub of the coastal shipping trade. Additionally, it had to pay a higher cartage charge on its goods from Circular Quay. Matters became ever more difficult for the company so that it made an overture to the Queensland Steam Shipping Company on 30 October 1886, which resulted in the amalgamation of the two companies to form the Australasian United Steam Navigation Company. It took over all assets of the ASN Co. except the engineering works. The company already had adequate wharfage and found Campbell's Wharf redundant. On 21 May 1887, the Australasian Steam Navigation Company, then in liquidation, offered Campbell's Wharf to the government for £300,000. It had sold all of its steam ships. Most of the wharf was described as leased. The description of the wharf included amongst its listing "Eleven 3-story [sic] stores built of brick on stone", which were known as the Metcalfe Bond and were let to J. Upward at £1,650 with a lease running until July 1890. The government responded on 26 July 1887 that it was only willing to offer £275,000 for the ASN wharf, an offer which was later accepted by the shareholders of the company.

=== Ownership by the Crown ===
On 27 September 1887, the Government Surveyor, S. E. Perdriau surveyed the land and found that it comprised 3 acres 10 perches, of which 1 acre 2 roods and 28 perches were part of the 1814 grant and 1 acre 1 rood 22 perches were included in the 1878 grant of reclaimed land. A plan which was filed with the papers for the sale to the government and probably prepared by Perdriau showed all the buildings on the site. The formal conveyance of the wharf from the ASN Co. to The Crown occurred on 28 October 1887, for £275,000. The plan accompanying the deed showed that part of Campbell's 1814 grant, along Lower George Street, had been sold to J. W. Cliffe and W. Clarke. It also showed all buildings on the site. The Metcalfe Stores was shown as partially built on the reclaimed land and not wholly on the 1814 grant.

The government demolished most of the buildings to build a Navigation Board slipway, leaving only the Metcalfe Bond stores. It ejected the P & O Company from its lease and leased the land to Blackwall and Company who demolished the P & O buildings and built new ones, which were occupied in 1888 by Flood and Company.

The 1889 Detail Survey showed an outline of the Metcalfe Bond stores. The 1895 version of the survey showed the outline of the stores shown with Branch Office, Government Printing Office at the northern end. Re-decking of the old ASN Co. wharf was undertaken by the Public Works Department in 1890 at a cost of £454/1/3. Upward & Co. of Circular Quay continued to lease the Metcalfe Stores, at least until 1901.

In 1901, the Sydney Harbour Trust took over the Stores. The 1901 Darling Harbour Resumption Plan shows the Metcalfe Stores as Bond and Free Stores with a branch of the Government Printing Office at the northern end. The survey appears to be based upon the 1895 Detail Survey. The same year, the Sydney Harbour Trust came to an agreement with Norddeutscher Lloyd to build it a new wharf measuring 305 and 12 metres (1,000 and 40 ft) wide, with offices and other buildings which the company would lease for three years at £2,500 per annum. Associated with this work was the reconstruction of the twin piers into a substantial central jetty, with full length sheds. Also in 1901, the Sydney Harbour Trust compiled a Register of Assets, which described for the former Campbell's Wharf, "Two large store stone and brick, slate roof each three floors. The Southern Store has eleven divisions built of stone and brick. The Northern Store has four divisions built of Stone". A memo regarding the Northern Store stated To be demolished. The tenant of the Southern Store was given as "Upward & Coy" at £500 per annum payable monthly. The Sydney Harbour Trust maintained the Metcalfe Stores and did not demolish it in the wholesale removal of buildings which accompanied the building of the Norddeutscher Lloyd wharf. In 1902, it undertook repairs costing £7/15/0 to Metcalfe's Bond Store. Small repairs were shown in later reports.

During the twentieth century, a series of other modifications have been made. In 1932, a fire broke out in the northern addition to the Metcalfe Bond stores which housed part of the Government Printing Office and the offices of Metcalfe and Upward. Metcalfe and Upward moved after the fire to the second floor in the centre of the stores. The brick section damaged by the fire was later rebuilt. In 1958, the southernmost bay of the Metcalfe Stores was removed to allow construction of the Overseas Passenger Terminal, leaving ten bays.

The move of commercial maritime activities out of Sydney Cove and into Darling Harbour and Pyrmont affected Campbell's Stores in the twentieth century. During the late nineteenth century, Circular Quay developed as a terminus for sightseers and day-trippers. The mix of commercial and recreational activities was causing Sydney Cove to become heavily congested, particularly at weekends. One of the first acts of the Harbour Trust after it gained control of the area in 1901 was an attempt to relieve congestion by the resumption of foreshore land and constructing two jetties and a longshore wharf on the eastern side of Bennelong Point. The eastern side of the quay was devoted to recreational traffic by the 1930s and was completely remodelled for that purpose in the 1950s, commercial activity continued in the vicinity of Campbell's Wharf into the late 1950s and early 1960s. Yet the importance of that area for commercial shipping had declined and this was reflected in changing use patterns of Campbell's Stores. After the erection of the Overseas Passenger Terminal in the 1960s, the area was no longer used as a commercial shipping area, as all such activity had moved to Darling Harbour and Pyrmont. Campbell's Stores subsequently came into the control of the Sydney Cove Redevelopment Authority (later Sydney Cove Authority) after being handed over by the Maritime Services Board (successor to the Sydney Harbour Trust) in the 1970s. The Sydney Cove Authority later redeveloped the stores and paved the way for the Store's current use as a restaurant area. In the mid-1980s, substantial works were undertaken in the vicinity of Campbell's Stores as part of the Australian Bicentenary celebrations that included the removal of some of the wharfage near Campbell's Stores. In 1998, the Sydney Harbour Foreshore Authority assumed control of the area including the Campbell's Stores.

== Description ==
The site comprises the land to the north to the Park Hyatt Hotel, to the harbour sea wall to the east, and to the south east covering the site of the original Campbell Stores building. The new Metcalfe Stores, on the site of the Campbell gardens, is a related site. Campbell's Stores comprise eleven gable fronted, three storey high rectangular plan bays. The bays are oriented almost due east west and, when constructed, were built partially on reclaimed land and were only about 20 metres (66 ft) from the wharf edge. The building as a whole is oriented almost due north-south. The northernmost bay (Bay 11) is of different materials and construction to the other ten bays and was the last built being completed about 1890s. It abuts the homogenous series of ten bays which are immediately to the south. Bays 1-10 are almost identical measuring 8.1 metres (27 ft) wide and 15.8 metres (52 ft) long. Bays 1-10 have a continuous front (east facade) and rear (west facade) with openings in both. The ground floor in all bays is presently a concrete slab while Level 2 and Level 3 floors are timber boards on timber joists. The simple roofs are slate sheathed with lead capping and copper-lined trough gutters. Bays 1-10 are sandstone constructions both internally and externally to the top of Level 2, with brick above, including the gable ends. The first five bays to be constructed were built in 1851/52 and are the present Bays 6-10. A further three bays, which are the present Bays 3-5 were completed around 1858 and the final three bays were finished by 1860. Of these last three bays, the southernmost and the final one to be completed was demolished in 1958 to make way for the first overseas shipping terminal at Circular Quay. This left two bays, now known as Bays 1 and 2, and the remaining eight to form the group known as the Campbell's Stores. The building was stepped up towards the south with a rise of about 0.3 metres (1 ft 0 in) between Bays 1 and 2 and Bays 4 and 5, the change in level being most evident by the string course at gable level and the second level sill course. When originally completed the building was only two storeys high.

Note: This building contains a hydraulic hoist and single cylinder gas engine which are important items located within the building.

Style: Maritime Georgian; Storeys: 3; Facade: Sandstone (Bays 1-10) to the top of Level 2, with brick above, including the gable ends. Bay 11 is brick.; Side Rear Walls: Sandstone; Internal Walls: Sandstone; Roof Cladding: The roofs are slate sheathed with lead capping and copper-lined trough gutters; Floor Frame: The ground floor in all bays is a concrete slab while Level 2 & 3 floors are timber boards on timber joists; Roof Frame: Timber.

=== Condition ===
As at 24 May 2006, externally, the building is in fair condition: there are cracks in the walls and sandstone pointing is required. Internally, some sections of sandstone walling on the lowest level are in a highly deteriorated condition. Also, much alteration which has caused damage to or obscured significant fabric and fitout work has been undertaken. The Campbell's Stores site has potential archaeological, scientific and research significance relevant to earlier uses and the development of the site. Timber gantries have been removed and are in storage at 190 Cumberland Street. Preventative maintenance has been undertaken to the remaining timbers. Potential archaeological resource.

Archaeology Assessment Condition: Partly disturbed. Assessment Basis: Terraced into hill slope from Campbells Cove. Investigation: Archaeological Assessment

=== Modifications and dates ===
Sometime between 1882 and 1887, the third level was added to the stores. Unlike the lower two levels, this addition was in dry pressed, well consolidated brick, laid in English bond. The stone gable end was completely removed and replaced with brick. In c. 1895 or 1915 an additional bay was built on the northern end. In 1958, the southern bay was demolished for the construction of the Overseas Passenger Terminal. Since then, Campbell Stores have undergone at least two adaptations. The first was sometime before 1970 and little is known of it. The newly established SCRA oversaw the most fundamental change in usage of Campbell's Stores from commercial to tourist uses, and the greatest change in fabric since the addition of the third level in 1883. The restoration, commenced in 1974/75 and completed 1978/79 was one of the first major restoration projects in Sydney, and included replacement of damaged sandstone and construction of a service tunnel along the full length of the western side of the building. In general, the work done in the 1970s has remained unchanged until today. Some remedial work has been undertaken to stonework in poor repair since 1996.

=== 2015–2018 redevelopment ===
In 2011 discussions were initiated between Sydney Harbour Foreshore Authority (SHFA) and a Joint Venture comprising Dockside and Imperial Peking restaurant group. Dockside and Imperial Peking restaurant group are the major lessees within the Campbell’s Stores. By letter dated 19 November 2012 the existing lessees put forward submissions to SHFA including a Financial Offer for the re-development of Campbell’s Stores. Existing lessees formed a Special Purpose Vehicle, Tallawoladah (Pty Limited) for the purposes of the submission and ongoing negotiations. Following SHFA’s review of the Tallawoladah Financial Offer, SHFA confirmed an in principle agreement to proceed by separating the building and public domain works, including the lowering of the Promenade with the lowering of the Promenade to be within the NSW Government’s scope and at their risk. The in principle agreement set out terms including rent, rent escalation and period of lease for an Agreement to Lease

The proposed renovation included:

- Removal of intrusive exterior elements and internal fit-outs of little significance: The overall significance of the Campbell’s Stores is to be recaptured with the removal the 1980s shade canopies and sail ship masts from the eastern elevation that fronts the promenade to Campbell’s Cove, removal of the 1980s south brick wall duct to Bay 1, and removal of the glazed pavilion at the north end of the Campbell’s Stores, referred to as Bay 12. The interior of Campbell’s Stores is to be cleared of numerous kitchen and amenity areas, goods lifts, stairways and all services, including redundant air-conditioning.

These works will improve the presentation of the Campbell’s Stores with enhanced visibility, particularly from the promenade and the harbour, as well as the exposure of internal fabric and the facilitation of required conservation.

- Conservation and reconstruction works: The existing sandstone building will be sensitively conserved to highlight and celebrate the historic contribution of the Campbell’s Stores to the settlement of Sydney. A range of remediation works will address the current deterioration of the Campbell’s Stores building, including upgrading the existing subfloor stormwater infrastructure, the forecourt pavement levels and the provision of subfloor ventilation. The works also include the conservation of deteriorated fabric, replacement of the slates to the roof, and reconstruction of redundant internal wall and floor openings.

These form part of the conservation works established by SHFA (and their consultants) to reverse the existing deterioration of the original building fabric, including the sandstone walls, which will make a significant contribution to the delivery of the key recommendations contained within the Conservation Management Plan prepared by Godden Mackay Logan in 2014 (for SHFA) and endorsed by the Heritage Council.

- Adaptive reuse and revitalisation: The adaptive reuse of Campbell’s Stores includes improved through site public access, new amenities and new services’ infrastructure for future kitchen fit-outs. Proposed adaptive reuse will be complemented by a new stand-alone canopy along the forecourt for patron amenity, and a new stand-alone structure to the north, referred to as ‘Bay 12’, which allows for the integration of the Campbell’s Stores into the precinct of The Rocks.

The proposed adaptive reuse of the existing building for restaurants, cafes and bars will complete the planned conservation of the Campbell’s Stores to an ongoing viable use for future generations. The continued use of the building for restaurants is in accordance with the recommendations of the Conservation Management Plan, which seeks to maximise public access to the Campbell’s Stores to enable an appreciation of its heritage significance by a broad range of visitors.

== Heritage listing ==
As at 24 February 2005, Campbell's Stores and site are of State heritage significance for their historical and scientific cultural values. The site and building are also of State heritage significance for their contribution to The Rocks area which is of State Heritage significance in its own right.

Campbell's Stores are a superb example of mid-nineteenth century warehouse buildings, now rare in Sydney. They are the only warehouses of their type remaining on the foreshores of Sydney Cove, the hub of commerce and international shipping transport until the late nineteenth century. As a memorable and easily recognisable landmark in The Rocks, visible from a wide area of Sydney Harbour, they have iconic value as a symbol of mid nineteenth century Sydney. Campbell's Stores have historic significance for their association with the Campbell family, one of the earliest and most influential free immigrant families in Australia. They are the surviving element of a complex of wharves and stores that began in 1801 with the construction by Robert Campbell of the first privately owned wharf in Australia. Later significant associations include the Australasian Steam Navigation Company, one of the most important commercial shipping and transport companies in Australian, and the Sydney Harbour Trust, established by the Government following of the bubonic plague scares of 1901. Campbell Stores is significant for its association with commercial Bond and Free store usage for over one hundred and twenty years, with each successive owner, including the Sydney Harbour Trust and Maritime Services Board, leasing sections of the Stores to a variety of merchant companies. The changes made to Campbell's Stores provide evidence of the changing commercial fortunes of maritime Sydney. The construction of the first five bays demonstrate economic growth following the 1840s depression, and the additional six bays demonstrate further economic growth, following the 1850s gold rushes. The construction of the third level by the ASN Co in the mid 1880s demonstrates a further period of economic growth and also of a change in the functional operation of the Stores, as evidenced by the inter-connection of the top floor spaces.

The adaptive reuse of the building in the 1970s represents an early approach to the conservation of historic buildings. The continued subsequent use of the building for a series of restaurants demonstrates the changing uses of Sydney Cove from industrial purposes to largely tourist-related purposes. The design, form and materials of Campbell's Stores contribute to their aesthetic significance as a complex of buildings of high visual and sensory appeal. Their design elements reflect their original function in a simple but dignified manner. Their form is a coherent whole, made up of repetitive gabled bays combined with an undulating rhythm of door and window openings. The consistent use of sandstone, brick and slate materials reinforces this visual coherence and provides an appearance of solidity and quality.

Campbell's Stores represent a surviving example of mid nineteenth century style warehouses; a building type once common around Sydney Cove, but now rare. The gabled bay form, cathead beams, hoists, goods aprons and doors are evidence of an older warehouse style. The form, bars on openings and lack of internal connections between bays evidence the security required for bond store use. Campbell's Stores have social significance for their contemporary role in cultural tourism. They are esteemed as an historic icon by Sydney-siders as well as international and domestic tourists, due to their appearance, location and use. Campbell's Stores have technical/research significance because of their potential to contribute further to our understanding of the early maritime activity around Sydney Cove and, in particular, within the Campbell's Wharf complex. They also have the ability to contribute further to our understanding of the use and operations of mid-nineteenth century warehouse buildings, particularly in relation to goods handling and the changes in technology that occurred over time. The remnant hoisting equipment of the Campbell's Stores building provides evidence of the changes of technology in goods handling and haulage that occurred during the nineteenth and twentieth century. The hydraulic hoisting equipment and the winches in particular are evocative of the industrial nature of the site and the hydraulic hoists are prominent examples within the Sydney area. They demonstrate the scale and efficiency of the industrial processes undertaken at Campbell's Stores during its use as dockside goods storage.

High Significance Fabric: Original fabric from the first three phases of construction (up to c. 1885). Industrial items including the hydraulic hoist are also of high significance. Medium Significance Fabric: Bay 11 (Branch Stores Government Printer) c. 1895, Bay 10 alterations made to facilitate the construction of Hickson Road, c. 1915. New door openings made on Level 2 as a result of the construction of Hickson Road in c. 1915. Low Significance Fabric: Reconstruction of fabric as part of 1970s restoration program (e.g. sandstone restoration of eastern ground floor facade). Fabric introduced to provide for new uses in 1970s works (e.g. service tunnel at rear, original restaurant, adaptation work, etc.).

Campbell's Stores was listed on the New South Wales State Heritage Register on 10 May 2002 having satisfied the following criteria.

The place is important in demonstrating the course, or pattern, of cultural or natural history in New South Wales.

Campbell's Stores are a rare example of mid nineteenth century warehousing in Sydney and the only of its type remaining on the foreshores of Sydney Cove. Campbell's Stores provide evidence of the changing nature of activities around Sydney Cove, the importance of this area as the hub of commerce and international shipping transport until the late nineteenth century, and its recent role as a cultural focus of international importance. The construction of the first five bays of Campbell's Stores in 1851-52 demonstrate the improved and changing commercial fortunes of Sydney and the Campbell family from the late 1840s after the earlier depression. The construction of the additional six bays between 1858 and 1861 demonstrate further economic growth and the impact of the 1851 gold rushes, that resulted in an increased colonial population and the need in Sydney and NSW for commercial storage. The construction of the third level of Campbell's Stores by the Australasian Steam Navigation Company in the mid 1880s demonstrates a further period of commercial confidence in Sydney during a highly competitive period when the expansion and absorption of companies was reshaping the corporate structures of New South Wales shipping. The withdrawal of the ASN Co from Campbell's Stores in the late 1880s reflects the increasing dominance of Darling Harbour as the principal area of commercial shipping activity in Sydney. The hydraulic hoists and winches fixed to the building demonstrate some of the technological changes in late nineteenth-century handling of goods.

The external fabric of the Campbell's Stores demonstrates four phases of technological change in the handling of goods in and around the building. The loading doors on the two lower levels and the cat-head beams of the manual handling phase were in use during most of the nineteenth century. The presence of loading doors on both levels demonstrates that each space, on the upper and lower levels of the bays, were separate from one another. The installation of hydraulic hoisting equipment following the addition of the third level to the Campbell Stores illustrates the goods handling and haulage technology introduced in the late nineteenth century. The hydraulic rams, the gas engine-driven winch and the two motor-driven winches were integral to the efficiency of third floor and demonstrate the development in hoisting equipment from the traditional cat-head hoist at the turn of the century. The internal layout of the Campbell's Stores clearly demonstrates the importance of the lifting devices to the efficiency of operations on all levels. By the twentieth century, all of level three of the Campbell's Store building was served by mechanical lifting equipment, and previously separate bays were linked by openings in the walls on the upper level.

The acquisition of Campbell's Stores by the Government in 1887 is evidence of a broader government interest in controlling infrastructure and utilities, increasing interest in this area as a base for its own maritime activities. Evidence of the Government acquisition is provided by the establishment of the Branch Stores Office of the Government Printing Office, adjacent to the northern end of Campbell's Stores (now Bay 11). The construction of Hickson Road and its impact on Campbell's Stores is evidence of work of the Sydney Harbour Trust and the changes that occurred in this area as a result of the bubonic plague scares of 1901. Evidence of the construction of Hickson Road is found in the alterations to the west facade of Bay 10 and the current alignment of Bay 11. Campbell Stores are significant for their association with commercial Bond and Free Store usage for over one hundred and twenty years from 1851 to c. 1970, with each successive owner, including the Sydney Harbour Trust and Maritime Services Board, leasing sections of the Stores to a variety of merchant companies. The demolition of the southernmost bay of Campbell's Stores to facilitate construction of the elevated roadway for the Overseas Passenger Terminal development is evidence of a shift away from the traditional usage of this area. The fabric and use changes instigated by the Sydney Cove Redevelopment Authority in the early 1970s are further evidence of the increasing importance of The Rocks as a tourist destination and cultural area and an interest in historic buildings generally. This was one of the first major adaptive reuse and restoration projects undertaken in Sydney and it reflects the philosophical approach to conservation at the time. The existence of Campbell's Stores is indicative of the success of the "green bans" in the 1970s which prevented the wholesale redevelopment of The Rocks. The changes that have occurred since the 1970s in the fit-out of the leased areas for restaurant use reflect different aspirations and approaches to the recycling of historic buildings. The interior of the Waterfront Restaurant reflects an "historic" maritime character, the 'Imperial Peking'; and the "Italian Village" are based on a transformation of character using Asian and European cultural imagery, while respectively, "Wolfies" involves a contemporary fit-out which retains more of the original spatial character and finishes than the other examples.

The place has a strong or special association with a person, or group of persons, of importance of cultural or natural history of New South Wales's history.

Campbell's Stores are associated with the Campbell family, one of the first free immigrant families in Australia and one of the most influential. Campbell's Stores are a surviving element of an evolving complex of wharves and stores that began with the construction by Robert Campbell (Sen), the founder of the dynasty, of the first privately owned wharf in Australia, in 1801. Although Campbell's Stores were not built for Robert Campbell (Sen), they were erected for the firm he created which was then managed by his sons. The first five bays of Campbell's Stores demonstrate the consolidation of this pioneer commercial dynasty rather than the pioneering phase of that family's growth. Campbell's Stores were associated with one of the most important commercial shipping and transport companies in Australian history, the ASN Co. The construction of the third level of Campbell's Stores by the ASN Co. in the mid 1880s demonstrates the company's commercial confidence in Sydney. The withdrawal of the ASN Co. from Campbell's Stores in the late 1880s reflects the financial over-extension of the Company. The technology in use in the operation of the hydraulic hoisting equipment and winch is associated with the Clyde Industries Group, one of the earliest and largest manufacturing organisations in Australian history. The large wheels of the winches mounted on Level 3 in Bays 3 and 9, each bear an embossed inscription bearing the words "Hudson Brothers Limited Clyde". Hudson Brothers dominated the Australian manufacturing industry in the late nineteenth century and was later amalgamated into Clyde Engineering Co Ltd, responsible for rolling stock, steam locomotives and, most famously, the structural steel for the northern approaches to the Sydney Harbour Bridge.

The place is important in demonstrating aesthetic characteristics and/or a high degree of creative or technical achievement in New South Wales.

Campbell's Stores are a superb example of mid-nineteenth century warehouse buildings; a building type now rare in Sydney. They have iconic value as a representation of early Sydney, particularly in the area around Sydney Cove and The Rocks. The iconic value of their distinctive form is evidenced by their adoption as the logo of the Sydney Cove Authority. They have landmark value as a dominant and easily recognisable form that is visible from a wide area of Sydney Harbour, the Harbour Bridge and North Sydney. The design, form and materials of Campbell's Stores contribute to a complex of buildings of high visual and sensory appeal. Their design reflects and describes the buildings' original function in a simple but dignified manner. Their form is a coherent whole made up of repetitive gabled bays combined with an undulating rhythm of door and window openings. The consistent use of sandstone, brick and slate materials reinforces this visual coherence and provides an appearance of solidity and quality. Campbell's Store have aesthetic significance at a technical level because their form and design details allow for an understanding of their original use. They also represent a surviving example of older style warehouses; a building type once common around Sydney, but now rare. The gabled bay form, cat-head beams, hoists, goods aprons and doors are typical of the older, mid-nineteenth century, warehouse buildings. The gabled bay form, external staircases, bars on openings and lack of internal connections between bays (on Levels 1 and 2) evidence its bond store use. This required secure and segregated spaces, not only between bays but also between levels. The cat-head beams, goods aprons, pulleys, loading doors, hydraulic hoisting equipment and winches are demonstrative of the change from manual handling of goods to the use of hydraulic and other mechanical technology at Campbell's Stores during the nineteenth and twentieth centuries. The use of hydraulic hoisting equipment and mechanical winches became an integral part of the operations of the Stores, following the addition of a third level in the late nineteenth century. The hydraulic hoisting equipment and winches in particular are a prominent aesthetic element of the Campbell's Stores and are evocative of the industrial origins of this dockside site in Sydney Harbour. The functional design of the third level of the Campbell Stores is significant as it represents a transition in usage between the older style traditional warehouse form of self contained unit bays and the later, larger, warehouses with interconnected spaces. The adaptation of the earlier warehouse illustrates the application of new technology to an older building form. The original internal spatial volumes, timber floor and roof structure and other fabric associated with the original usage of Campbell's Stores is also significant as evidence of their warehouse use and of changes made to them over time for that use. The technology evident in this building such as the hydraulic hoisting equipment is evidence of technical innovation.

The place has a strong or special association with a particular community or cultural group in New South Wales for social, cultural or spiritual reasons.

Campbell's Stores have social significance within the contemporary community resulting from their role in cultural tourism. They are esteemed as a well known and easily identifiable historic icon by Sydney-siders as well as international and domestic tourists. Its high level of recognition is due, in part, to its location in one of the key recreational and tourist areas in Sydney and because of its popular restaurant use and resultant public exposure. Its greatest exposure, though, is to the thousands of ferry commuters who pass by it daily on their way to and from work in the city.

The place has potential to yield information that will contribute to an understanding of the cultural or natural history of New South Wales.

Campbell's Stores have the potential to contribute further to our understanding of the early maritime operation that occurred around Sydney Cove, and in particular within the Campbell's complex (see Section 4.0). They also have the potential to contribute further to our understanding of the use and operations of mid-nineteenth century warehouse buildings, particularly in the area of goods handling and the changes in technology that occurred over time. The Campbell's Stores site has potential archaeological, scientific and research significance relevant to earlier uses and the development of the site. The archaeological significance may have been reduced due to disturbance from later alterations and refurbishment works to the site.

The place possesses uncommon, rare or endangered aspects of the cultural or natural history of New South Wales.

Campbell's Stores are a rare example of mid nineteenth century warehousing in Sydney and the only building of its type remaining on the foreshores of Sydney Cove and Sydney Harbour. The collection of late nineteenth-century goods handling equipment is a rare assembly of different types of such equipment in a single location, providing a unique opportunity for comparison and interpretation.

The place is important in demonstrating the principal characteristics of a class of cultural or natural places/environments in New South Wales.

Campbell's Stores demonstrates the evolution and importance of Sydney Cove for maritime trading activities. The building is representative of a class of similar masonry warehouses that were once common on the shores of Sydney Harbour. The changes demonstrate the evolution of increasingly large warehouses in the second half of the nineteenth century, and the activities of the former Sydney Harbour Trust. The materials and construction are representative of mid-nineteenth century warehouses. It provides evidence for the lifting and storage of goods in nineteenth century maritime trade. The exterior of the Campbell's Stores Building displays the hydraulic hoisting equipment in use during the late nineteenth and early twentieth century. The hydraulic hoisting equipment is representative of a range of similar equipment in use in Sydney at the turn of the nineteenth century. The gas engine-driven winch and the motor driven winches are representative of the type scale and technology of mechanical lifting devices of the late nineteenth century in Australia. The winches manufactured by Hudson Brothers is representative of a wide range of mechanical equipment manufactured by this company for the domestic industrial market.

== See also ==
- Australian non-residential architectural styles
- Australasian Steam Navigation Company
- Overseas Passenger Terminal
