= SS Cawarra =

Ship

Coordinates: 32°54′52″S 151°47′48″E

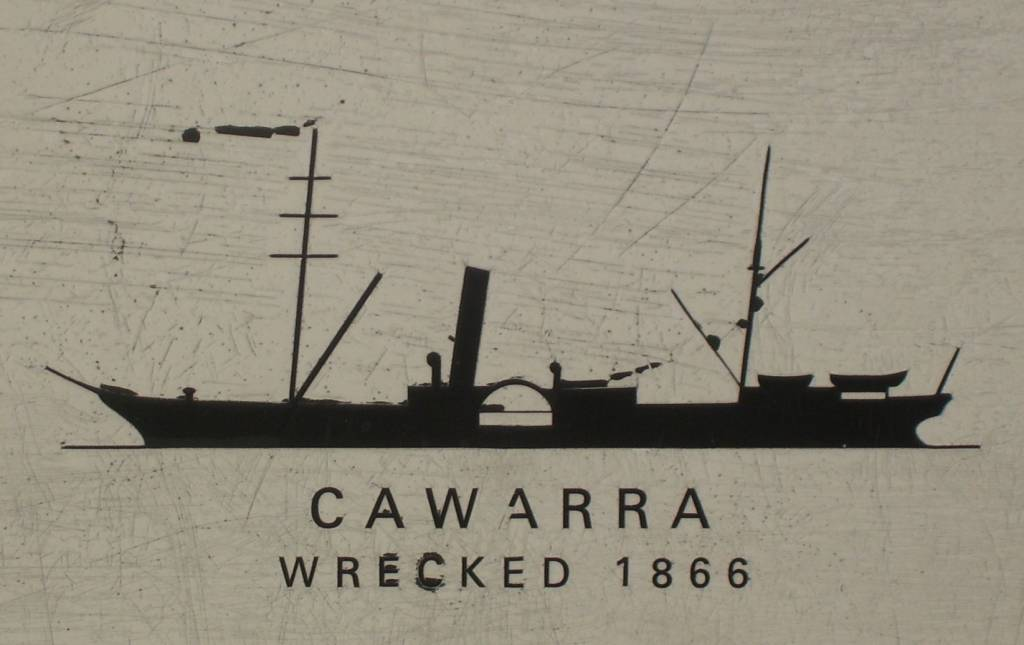

History

New South Wales
- Owner: Australasian Steam Navigation Company
- Operator: Australasian Steam Navigation Company
- Builder: A. & J. Inglis Pointhouse Glasgow, Scotland
- Yard number: 14
- Launched: 2 June 1864
- Completed: 1864
- Out of service: 12 July 1866
- Homeport: Sydney
- Fate: Foundered in Newcastle harbour on 12 July 1866 with the loss of 60 lives

General characteristics
- Tons burthen: 439
- Length: 64.28 m (211 ft)
- Beam: 7.665 m (25 ft)
- Draft: 3.688 m (12 ft)
- Propulsion: Steam
- Complement: 36 crew, 25 passengers

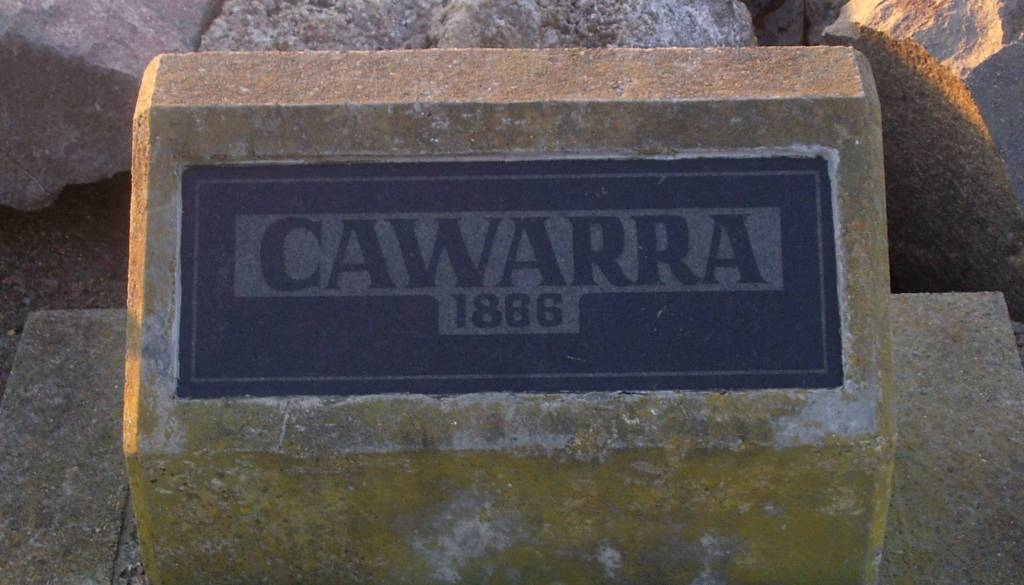
Plaque on Stockton breakwall commemorating the Cawarra

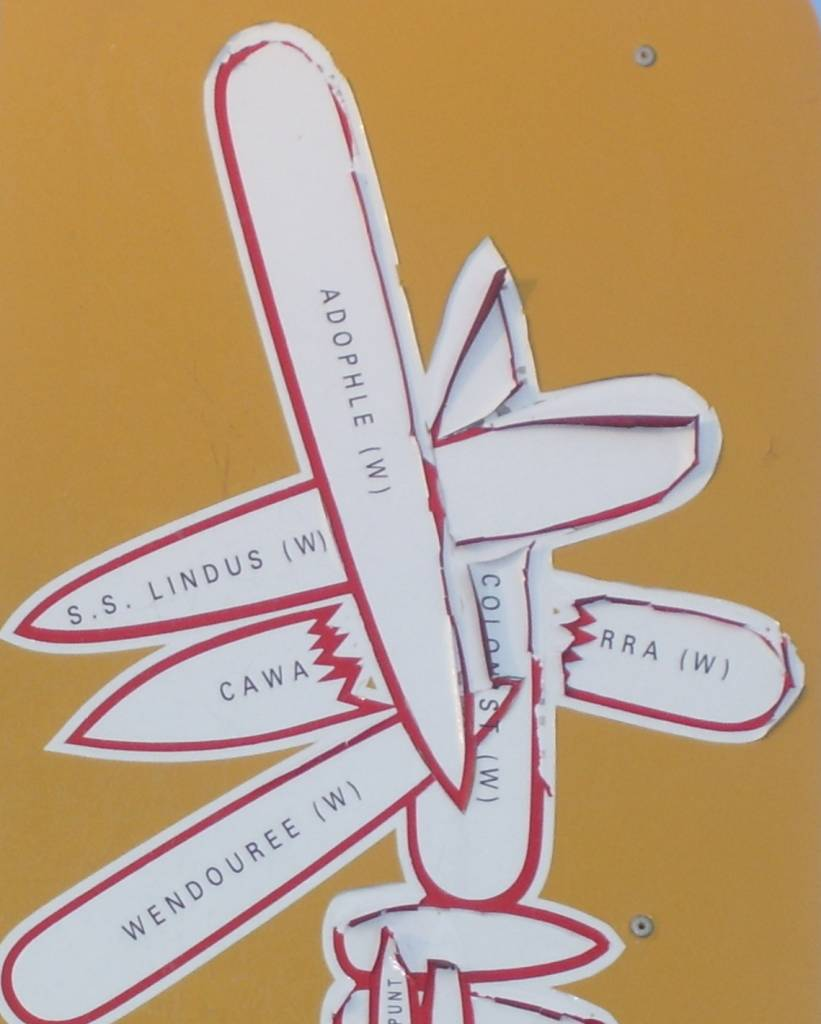
Location of Cawarra on Stockton breakwall in relation to other wrecks

The SS Cawarra was a paddle-steamer that sank on 12 July 1866 in Newcastle harbour, New South Wales, Australia sending sixty people to their deaths. The sinking was one of the worst maritime disasters in Australian history.

Owned by the Australasian Steam Navigation Company, the Brisbane-bound passenger vessel had become caught in rough seas off the east coast of Australia during storms that sank 14 other ships and resulted in 77 deaths between Port Stephens in the north and Sydney in the south. As the ship entered Newcastle harbour to take shelter it was overwhelmed by huge waves and sank, bow first, before thousands of onlookers who had gathered along the harbour shoreline to watch the stricken passenger ship. Its wreckage was recovered and, after removal of items of value, it was dumped on the Oyster Bank.

While only one passenger survived the sinking, 60 people were already dead.

"Several hours later, the lighthouse-keeper sighted a survivor and with his assistant James Johnson, who had been the sole survivor of the Dunbar wreck, launched a boat and brought the man ashore... Ordinary seaman [Frederick V] Hedges had grabbed a plank as the ship sank and was eventually washed more dead than alive against a harbour buoy."

The wreck today sits beneath the wreckage of three more vessels that have since foundered in the harbour. Along with other wrecks they were used in the construction of the Stockton breakwall where plaques commemorate the loss of each of the ships including the Cawarra.

== See also ==
- Dunbar (1853 ship)
- List of disasters in Australia by death toll
