= Bethel Union =

The Bethel Union, full name British and Foreign Seamen's Friend Society and Bethel Union, was a religious organisation for seafarers founded in 1819 by George Charles Smith ("Boatswain Smith").

== Background ==
The main seaports in England in the early 1800s were well served by numerous religious organisations that devoted themselves to the religious welfare of seafarers of merchant and navy ships. These societies were the precursors of the 'Seamen's Missions' still to be found in ports all over the world which provide social facilities, of more than a purely religious character. Crews are able to spend spare time ashore relaxing in a friendly and welcoming 'club-like' atmosphere. The Bethel ships provided by The Royal National Mission to Deep Sea Fishermen ( now known as the Fishermens Mission) provided respite, medical care, and when requested services at sea, to those who worked in what was and is still considered to be the most dangerous job in the world outside of the armed forces during conflict, the Fishermen, they would go out with the Fishing fleets taking many of the same risks in the freezing weather to look after the welfare of the Fishermen. The Fishermens Mission is still with us today as the only Charity to exclusively look after fishermen and their families Welfare, providing emergency support alongside practical, financial, spiritual and emotional care for all fishermen, active or retired, and their families.

One of these groups was known as the Bethel Movement whose activities were focused on chaplains conducting services on board ships lying in the port of London, and distributing religious tracts to crews, which spread to other ports of the British Empire such as Liverpool and Bristol and Sydney. Bethel is a Hebrew word meaning 'House of God'. Following a perceived need for a more formal organisation in 1819 to be known as the Bethel Union was founded.

== Britain ==
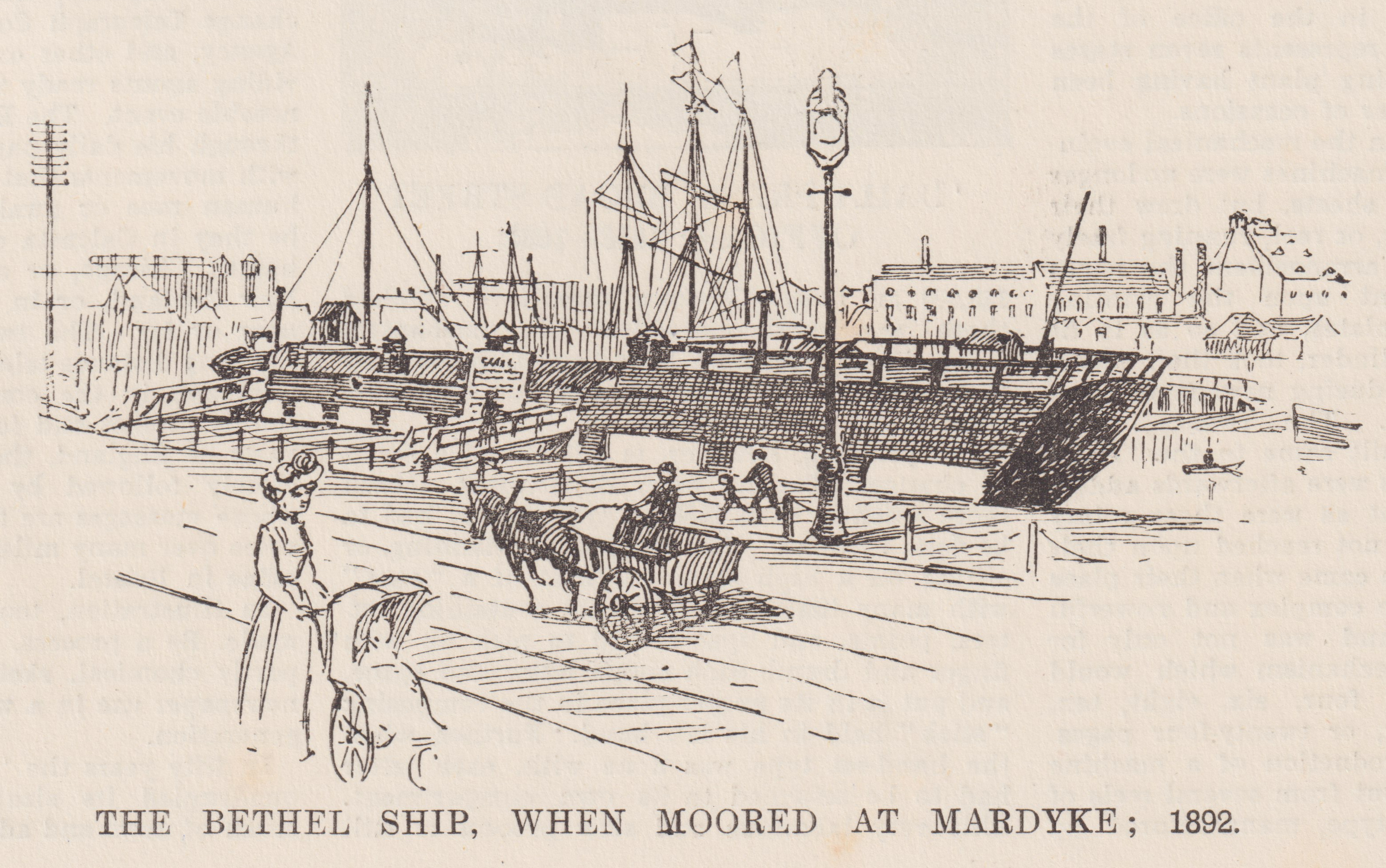
Bethel ship moored at Mardyke (Floating Harbour, Bristol), 1892

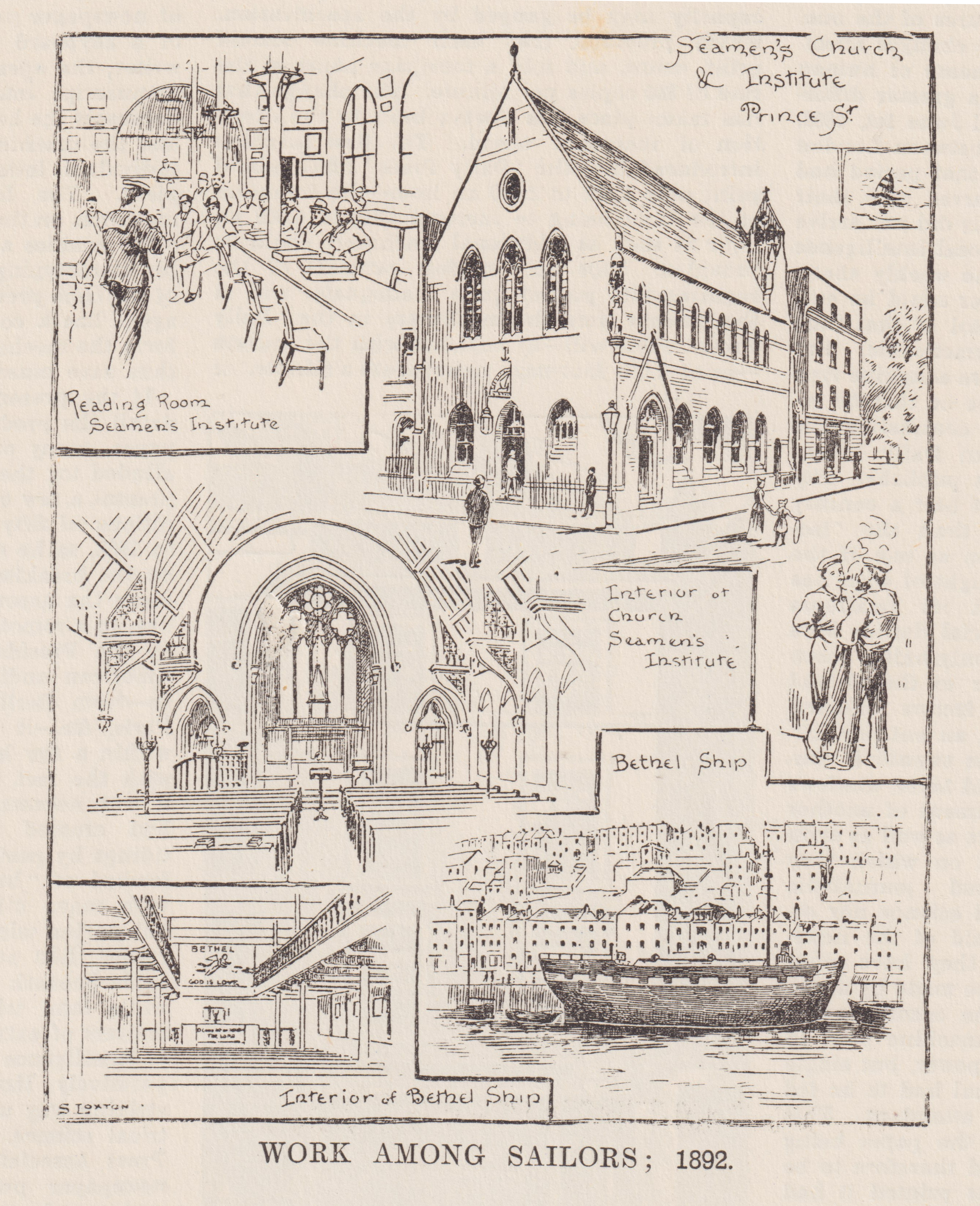
Work of seamen's charities in Bristol, 1892

In Bristol a branch of the Seamen's Friend Society and Bethel Union was established in 1820. In 1821 the hulk of the Aristomenes was purchased, fitted as a place of worship and moored at The Grove in Bristol. Dubbed 'The Ark' it could accommodate 800-1000 worshipers. A sailors home was later established. In 1846 the Aristomenes was condemned and replaced by H.M. bomb-ship Ætna, also moored at the Grove. It was replaced in 1883 by the Gloriosa, moored at Markdyke, a mile west down the Floating Harbour on Hotwells Road.

== Sydney ==
In Sydney, a Bethel Union Society was formed in 1822. In 1828 the Hobart Bethel Union Society was founded by George Augustus Robinson and set up on board a former magazine ship in Sullivan's Cove in 1828.

A more permanent base for the Sydney organisation was obtained from the colonial authorities in 1832, on Darling Harbour, which was moved in 1851. Five years later a site was obtained on Circular Quay ('The Rocks') and a church built in 1859, with an Annual Service to seafarers. The facilities were extended in the 1870s. In 1895, the Church of England Mission to Seamen became a Branch of The Missions to Seamen, England. Further extensions of the Sydney Bethel Union were made in 1910 with a recreation hall, a new chapel and a vestry, administrative offices, a library and an Officers' Room with some accommodation cubicles, a gymnasium, smoking room and other facilities were added.

On redevelopment of Circular Quay in the 1970s, a new site was obtained at 11-15 Macquarie Place, Sydney. It was opened in April 1977. Changes in the patterns of ship operations (smaller crews and faster turn round times) soon prompted At this time rapid changes were occurring in international shipping and these affected the operations of The Missions to Seamen. Macquarie Place was sold in 1985 and a property at 320-324 Sussex Street was obtained and the new facilities opened in 1993. Rebranded The Mission to Seafarers in 2002, The Sussex Street property was sold in 2011 and a new property was purchased at 24 Hickson Road, Millers Point.

Sydney Bethel Union continues to provide financial support to The Mission to Seafarers in Sydney and elsewhere in New South Wales.

== See also ==
- Mariners' Church, The Rocks
