= Australasian Steam Navigation Company =

Australian shipping company, 1839 and 1887

- Company type: Public
- Industry: Transport / Freight
- Predecessor: Hunter River Steam Navigation Company
- Founded: 1839
- Defunct: 1887
- Fate: Merged with the Queensland Steam Shipping Company
- Successor: Australasian United Steam Navigation Company
- Headquarters: Sydney, New South Wales, Australia
- Products: Shipping

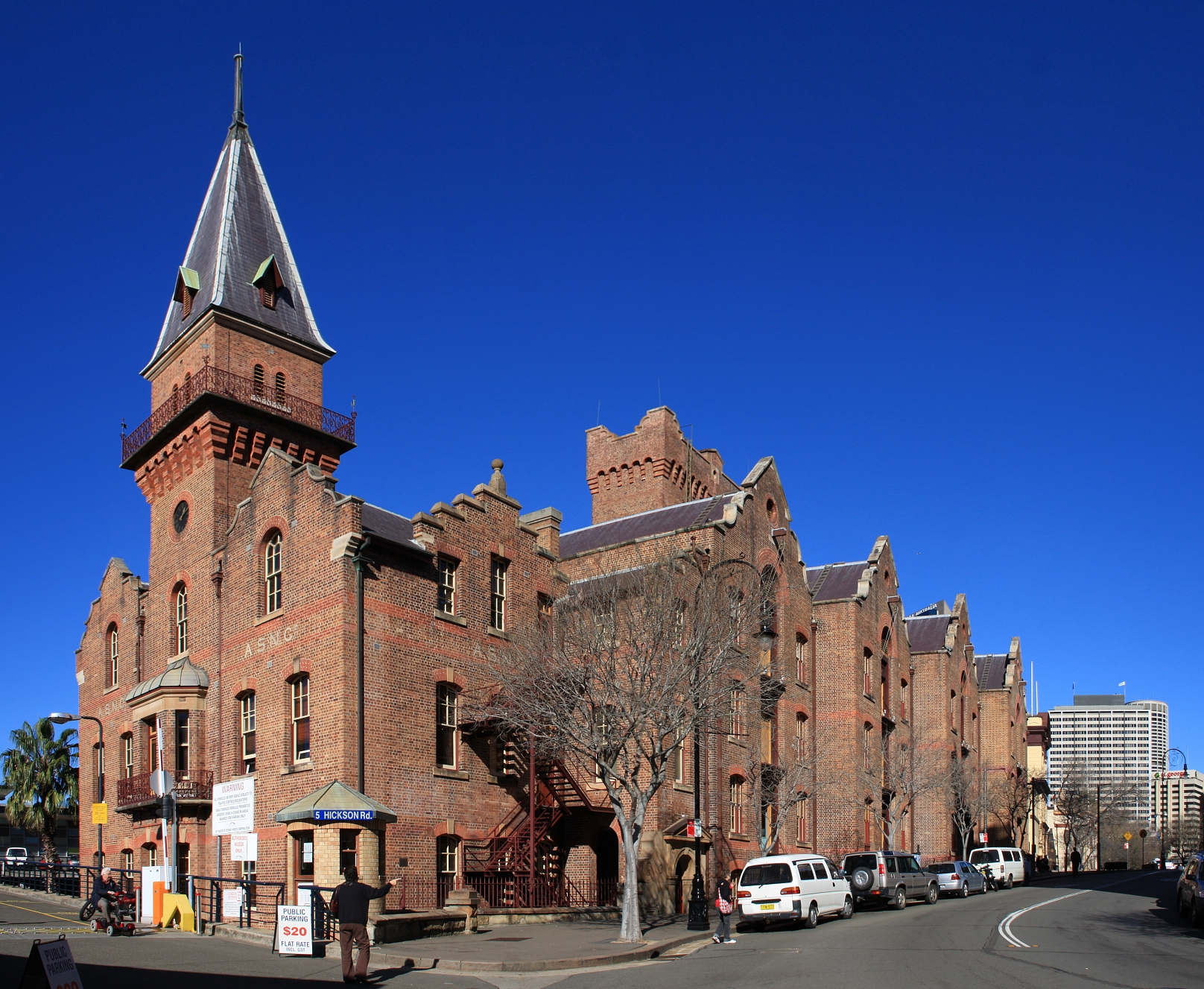
Former ASN Co offices and warehouse, in The Rocks, Sydney.

The Australasian Steam Navigation Company (ASN Co) was a shipping company of Australia which operated between 1839 and 1887.

== Company history ==
The company was started as the Hunter River Steam Navigation Company in 1839. In March 1851, the company was reformed as the Australasian Steam Navigation Company.

In 1887, the shipping company was amalgamated with the Queensland Steam Shipping Company with their respective vessels in 1887 to form the Australasian United Steam Navigation Company.

== Ships ==
The company's ships included:

- Alexandra (590 tons)
- Auckland, lost June 1871
- Birksgate (916 tons net)
- Bonito (77 tons register)
- Boomerang (stranded 1863)
- Bunyip (39 tons net)
- SS Cawarra (lost in April 1866)
- Cintra (1175 tons net)
- SS City of Adelaide (117 tons net), built 1863
- City of Melbourne (615 tons net)
- City of Sydney, lost 7 November 1862
- Dingadee (393 tons net)
- Egmont (419 tons net)
- Elamang (490 tons net)
- Eurimbla (598 tons net)
- Fitzroy (504 tons net)
- Florence Irving, wrecked December 1877
- Glanworth (558 tons net)
- Gunga (798 tons net)
- Hesketh (393 tons net)
- James Patterson (387 tons net)
- Katoomba (489 tons net)
- Leichardt (459 tons net)
- Ly-ee-moon
- Palmer (133 tons net)
- Porpoise (62 tons net)
- Queensland (369 tons net)
- Quiraing (653 tons net)
- Rangatira, wrecked May 1875
- Rockton (1198 tons net)
- Rose (172 tons), their first vessel
- Shamrock, their second vessel
- Sovereign
- Tamar
- Telegraph, wrecked October 1866
- Thistle, their third vessel
- Tenterden (867 tons net)
- Victoria (934 tons net)
- Wentworth (610 tons net)
- Wonga Wonga
- Wotonga, lost January 1882
- Yaralla (303 tons net)

== Shipwrecks and disasters ==
=== Wreck of the Sovereign ===
On 11 March 1847, the Sovereign was wrecked in the South Passage off Amity Point, North Stradbroke Island, Queensland with the loss of 44 lives; there were 10 survivors. While the actions of Captain Cape in the disaster were praised by the survivors, many questions were subsequently raised about the fitness of the vessel for the voyage. An inspection of the wreck showed that the planking and fastenings were not in good condition; the inner planking was described as "perfectly rotten". The engines were said to be suitable for river navigation but not for an ocean voyage to Brisbane. The storage of cargo on the deck was the direct cause of some deaths. There were no lifeboats (not being required at that time). The other concern was the use of the South Passage with its surf and shoals; while it was the shortest route from Sydney, it was not the safest entrance to Moreton Bay.

=== Loss of the City of Sydney ===
On 7 November 1862, the City of Sydney was lost at Green Cape, fortunately without loss of life.

=== Stranding of the Boomerang ===
In 1863, the Boomerang was stranded on the Upper Flats at Rockhampton.

=== Wreck of the Cawarra ===
In April 1866, the steamship SS Cawarra was wrecked at Newcastle with the loss of all but one man.

=== Wreck of the Telegraph ===
In October 1866, the steamship Telegraph was wrecked off Cape Perpendicular.

=== Loss of the Auckland ===
In June 1871, the steamer Auckland was lost in fog off the Ram Head.

=== Wreck of the Boomerang ===
In June 1874, the Boomerang went ashore near King's Reef.

=== Stranding of the James Patterson ===
In August 1874, the James Patterson was stranded on Mast Head Reef.

=== Wreck of the Rangatira ===
In May 1875, the steamer Rangatira was totally wrecked.

=== Fire on the Ly-ee-moon ===
In November 1877, the Ly-ee-moon was partly destroyed by fire.

=== Wreck of the Florence Irving ===
In December 1877, the Florence Irving was wrecked off Port Stephens.

=== Stranding of the Queensland ===
In December 1877, the Queensland was stranded in the Fitzroy River.

=== Loss of the Wotonga ===
In January 1882, the Wotonga was lost near Port Macquarie.

== See also ==
- ASN Co building
- Campbell's Stores
