= Sydney Harbour Foreshore Authority =

Australian local government agency

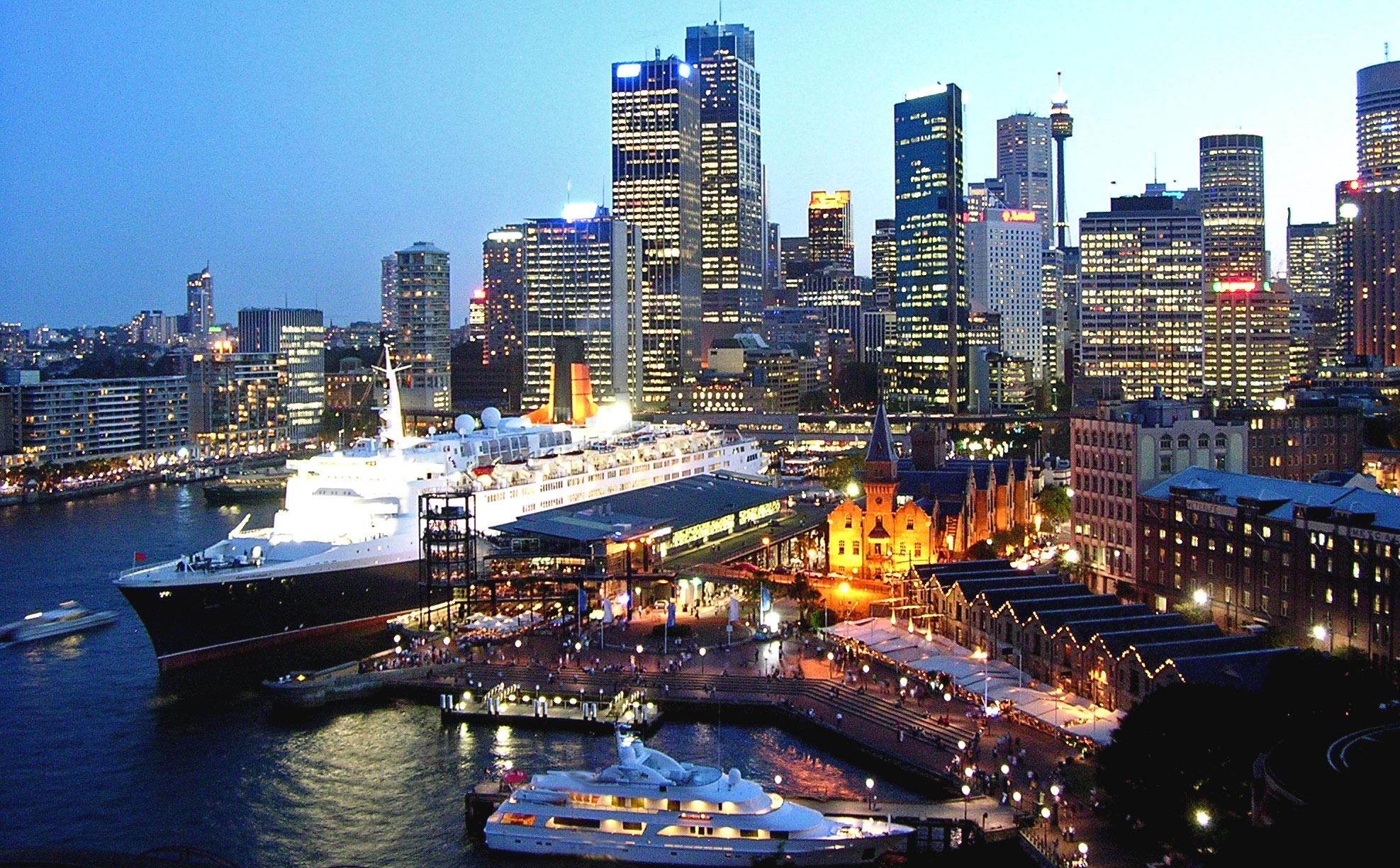
- Parts of Circular Quay and The Rocks, administered by the Sydney Harbour Foreshore Authority.

Statutory authority overview
- Formed: 1 February 1999
- Dissolved: 1 July 2016
- Superseding Statutory authority: Property and Development NSW
- Jurisdiction: White Bay Power Station, Darling Harbour, The Rocks, Luna Park Sydney, Circular Quay, Rozelle Rail Yards in Sydney, New South Wales
- Headquarters: 66 Harrington Street, The Rocks, New South Wales
- Minister responsible: Minister for Finance, Services and Property
- Parent Statutory authority: Department of Finance, Services and Innovation
- Key document: Sydney Harbour Foreshore Authority Act, 1998
- Website: shfa.nsw.gov.au

Sydney Harbour Foreshore Authority (SHFA) was a statutory authority that owned and managed some of the Government of New South Wales most significant Sydney harbour foreshore assets, including Sydney's heritage and cultural precincts at The Rocks and Darling Harbour. The Foreshore Authority was also place manager for a number of culturally significant sites in Sydney, including Rozelle Rail Yards, White Bay Power Station and Ballast Point Park.

== History ==
The authority was formed in 1998 under the Sydney Harbour Foreshore Authority Act, 1998 to consolidate the works and functions of the City West Development Corporation, Darling Harbour Authority and Sydney Cove Authority. In September 2015 the NSW Government announced that the Sydney Harbour Foreshore Authority's functions would be consolidated with Government Property NSW (Property NSW), as part of a move to consolidate government approaches to property and precinct management, including removing duplication of functions. The Statute Law (Miscellaneous Provisions) Act, 2015 took effect on 1 July, consolidating all functions of the SHFA into Property NSW.

=== Chairs ===
- Gerry Gleeson, 1 February 1999 – September 2004
- Jon Isaacs, September 2004 – 31 December 2007
- Mike Collins, 1 January 2006 – 29 August 2011
- Dick Persson, 29 August 2011 – 21 August 2014
- Les Wielinga, 21 August 2014 – 23 June 2015
- Helen Coonan, 23 June 2015 – 1 July 2016

== Role ==
The Authority's mandate was to:

- protect and enhance the natural and cultural heritage of the foreshore area
- promote, coordinate, manage, undertake and secure the orderly and economic development and use of the foreshore area, including the provision of infrastructure, and
- promote, coordinate, organise, manage, undertake, secure, provide and conduct cultural, educational, commercial, tourist, recreational, entertainment and transport activities and facilities.

The Authority managed commercial and retail leases, providing security, cleaning, building maintenance and other facility management services, and had the responsibility for heritage protection, including over 100 New South Wales State Heritage listed items.

The Authority had previously been responsible for managing specific areas of foreshore land in Sydney, including Barangaroo (managed by the Barangaroo Delivery Authority) and the Darling Quarter retail and commercial redevelopment at Darling Harbour.

As a part of the Department of Finance. Services and Innovation cluster, it was autonomously administered by a Board that reported to the New South Wales Minister for Finance, Services and Property.
