= Sydney Cove Redevelopment Authority =

The Sydney Cove Redevelopment Authority was an agency of the Government of New South Wales from 1970 to 1999. Its predecessor was the Sydney Cove Authority.

It was established on 12 January 1970 under the Sydney Cove Redevelopment Act 1968 to oversee redevelopment plans for the historic inner suburb of The Rocks. The redevelopment plans, drawn up by architect and town planner John Overall, would have seen large-scale demolitions within the historic district and the construction of large multi-storey tower blocks, with only a handful of historic buildings deemed to be particularly significant to be retained. They met with large-scale community opposition, including significant street protests (led by The Rocks Residents Group) and a two-year Green Ban from the Builders' Labourers Federation between 1971 and 1973. This resulted in a 1974 review of the scheme which ended the original proposal for a precinct of high-rise towers. The agency continued for many years, developing various projects while also assuming a greater focus on conservation.

Its remaining functions were taken over by the Sydney Harbour Foreshore Authority on 1 February 1999.
