= Ben Shewry =

New Zealand chef

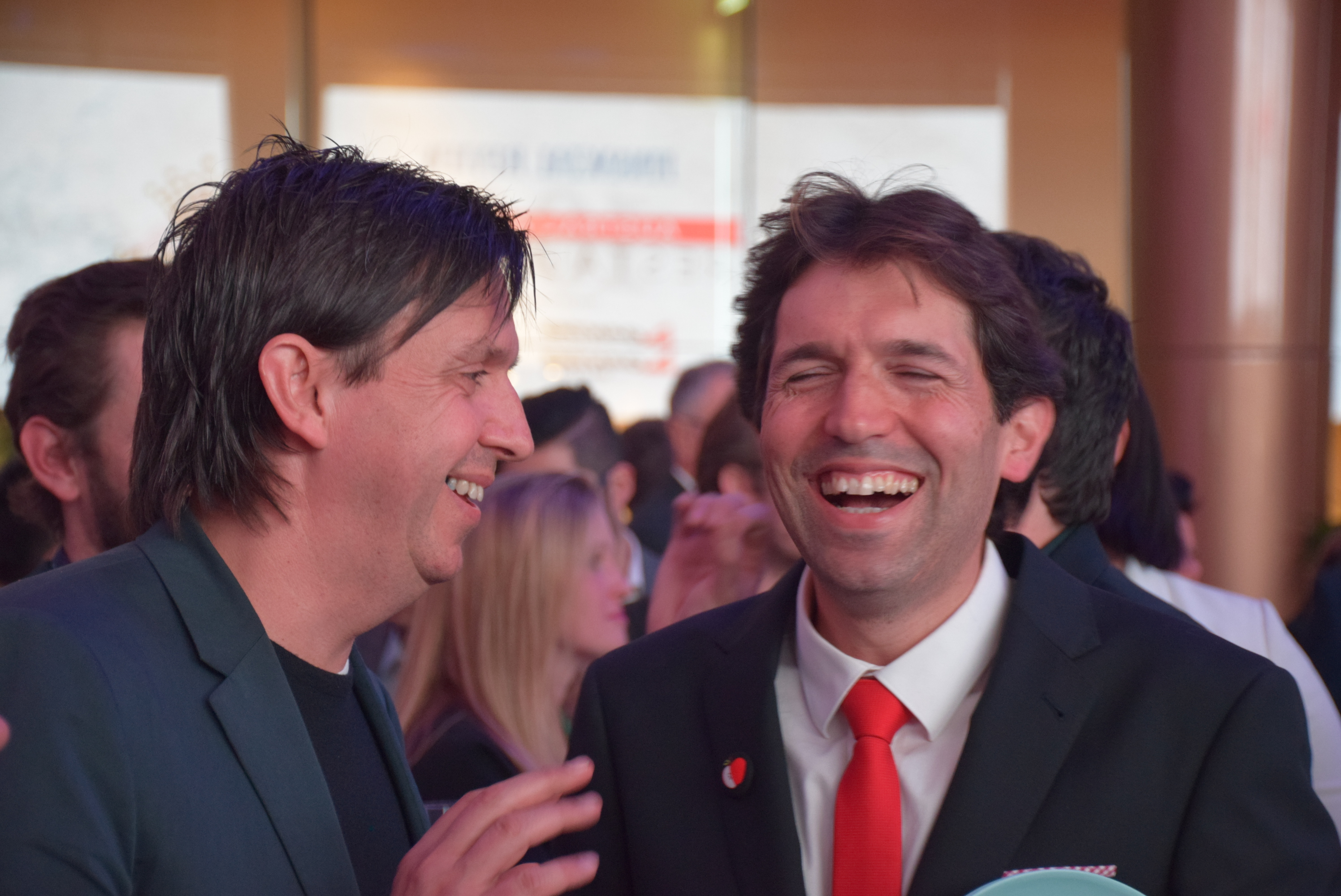
- Chefs Andrew McConnell (left) and Ben Shewry (right) at Australia's Top Restaurants Awards
- Born: 1977 (age 48–49); Waitara, New Zealand
- Spouse: Kylie Shewry
- Children: 3
- Culinary career
- Cooking style: Australian, Contemporary
- Rating
- Good Food Guide
- Current restaurant
- Attica
- Television show
- Chef's Table
- Awards
- Restaurant of The Year (Gourmet Traveller Restaurant Awards 2015); Best Restaurant in Australia (San Pellegrino's World's 50 Best Restaurants 2014); 3 Hats (The Age Good Food Guide 2014); Restaurant of The Year (The Age Good Food Guide 2009, 2012, 2014); Chef of The Year (The Age Good Food Guide 2011, 2014)
- Website: www.attica.com.au

Ben Shewry (born 1977) is a New Zealand chef and restaurateur. He is the owner of Attica, a restaurant in Melbourne, and has authored two books: Origin and Uses for Obsession.

== Early life ==
Shewry is a Melbourne, Australia-based chef who grew up on a farm in the North Island of New Zealand in the North Taranaki towns of Awakino and Whareorino. His food is influenced by his childhood upbringing in the natural surroundings and coastline of North Taranaki. He had his first job in a local restaurant when he was 10, he worked in a bakery when he was 13, and he had his first kitchen job when he was 14.

== Career ==
Shewry was one of six chefs featured in the inaugural season of the Netflix original documentary Chef's Table. In the documentary his life, struggles, and inspiration for cooking are detailed. His cooking philosophy is deeply rooted in using indigenous ingredients, in both the Australian and New Zealand contexts. Shewry has expressed enthusiasm about his own inspiration by the indigenous Maori hangi (or earth oven feast ceremony), and other indigenous ingredients such as kūmara (sweet potato) and native mutton bird.

The use of ingredients native to Australia in a top restaurant was an idea that was not widely accepted initially, making it difficult for his restaurant to garner a following. Eventually, his unorthodox style of cooking was recognized by locals and critics, and today Attica has received several prestigious awards including a decade on the World's 50 Best and attracts top chefs from around the world. Shewry also features in the Netflix series Restaurant Australia.

Ben was employed as the Head Chef of Attica Restaurant in 2005; before purchasing the restaurant from his employer in 2015.

In 2019, his restaurant Attica was named Australia's best restaurant at the Gourmet Traveller food awards.

Ben's most recent work is the publication of his book Uses for Obsession, A Chef's Memoir. In this book, Shewry discusses creative freedom in the kitchen, food journalism, sexism in hospitality, the fraud of the farm-to-table sustainability ethos, the cult of the chef, cooking as muse and the history of the Family Bolognese.

Ben Shewry believes in sustainability and has been an Ambassador for the Good Fish Project since December 2018. In a statement for the project, "In my position as a chef, I have a big influence on what people eat and what other people cook because our restaurant is well known. If I don't have what I would call a clean menu - if I don't have best practise, the most sustainable menu I can have in terms of shellfish and seafood - then I am contributing to the problem."

Attica Restaurant is also a B Corporation (certification); Service with Significant Environmental Footprint since February 2024, further cementing Shewry's beliefs in best practises for his business.
