= Quay (restaurant) =

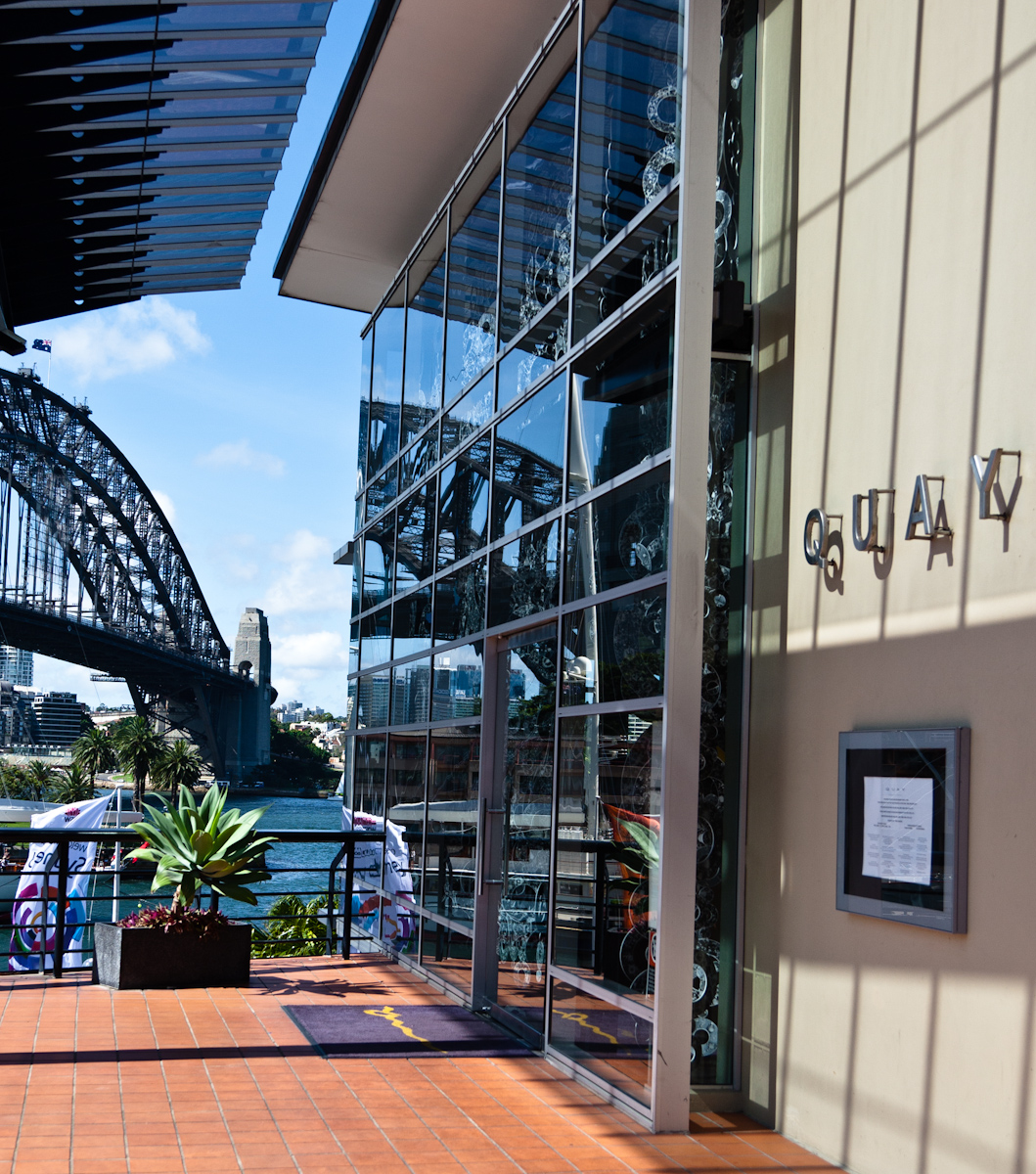
- The exterior of Quay
- Interactive map of Quay

Restaurant information
- Owner: Leon Fink
- Chef: Peter Gilmore
- Food type: Contemporary Australian
- Location: Overseas passenger terminal, The Rocks,, Sydney, New South Wales, 2000, Australia
- Coordinates: 33.858496°S 151.209683°E
- Seating capacity: 110
- Website: www.quay.com.au

Quay is a restaurant in Sydney, Australia. It is owned by Leon Fink, and is run by chef Peter Gilmore. It has won several awards in Australia, and has appeared in The World's 50 Best Restaurants several times.

== Description ==
Quay is located in the Overseas Passenger Terminal, Sydney Harbour, with views towards the Sydney Harbour Bridge. The restaurant is owned by Leon Fink. Chef Peter Gilmore joined the restaurant in 2001. It reopened after a major overhaul in July 2018.

=== Menu ===
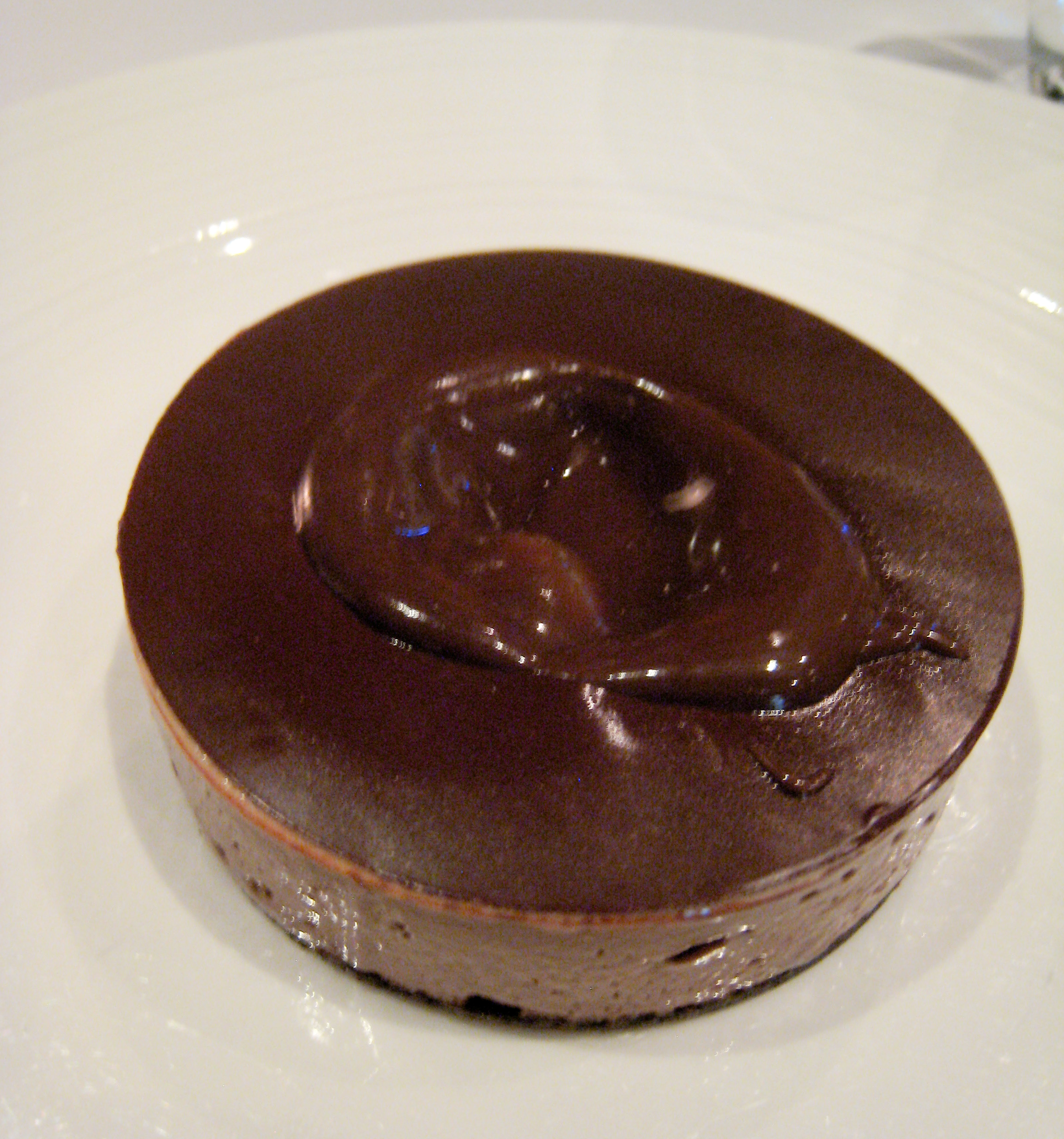
The eight texture chocolate cake

Quay serves contemporary Australian cuisine. The restaurant has several signature dishes, including the "Snow Egg", an egg-shaped poached meringue with an ice cream centre, which is coated in a sweet tuile by using a blow torch. It is served on a bed of fruit fool and granita. The "Snow Egg" was re-created in the finale of the 2010 series of MasterChef Australia and after achieving cult status was phased out in 2018. Another signature dish is Gilmore's "Eight-Textured Chocolate Cake", which in an earlier version included only five different textures, but was subsequently developed and now contains eight.

The menu's Asian influences include sashimi of bluefin tuna served with a horseradish cream and wasabi flowers in white tea jelly. Chinese techniques such as velveting are also used in the production of a lobster sauce in a dish which features lobster served three ways, the other ways being as a mousseline dumpling as well as the flesh itself. The mulloway served at the restaurant is sourced from an aquafarm in Palmers Island, New South Wales.

== Reception ==
Simon Thomsen visited the restaurant in 2009 for the Sydney Morning Herald, writing that "Quay could easily trade on its good looks – those harbour, Opera House and bridge views – but Gilmore is creating food as sublime and spectacular as the setting." He went on to describe Gilmore's cooking as a "virtuoso" performance. Scott Bolles for WA Today described the restaurant as "a special experience, granted one you'll need to stockpile money from Santa to enjoy. But the cocktail of great food, excellent wines and stunning Sydney Harbour views rarely come together as they do at Quay."

=== Awards ===
The first major award won by the restaurant was Restaurant of the Year in The Good Food Guide 2003. It was named best restaurant by Gourmet Traveller magazine in 2008 and 2009. It was also named as the best restaurant for the third time in The Sydney Morning Herald Good Food Guide 2009.

Quay has been included in The World's 50 Best Restaurants, first appearing in 2009 when it entered the list in 46th place. Among Australian restaurants, only fellow Sydney-based restaurant Tetsuya's was ranked higher. It rose to 27th place in 2010, and in 2011 it was ranked 26th. In 2012 it fell down the rankings for the first time to 29th place. Between 2010 and 2012 it was named the best restaurant in Australasia.

== See also ==
- List of restaurants in Australia
