= Overseas Passenger Terminal =

Passenger ship terminus in Sydney

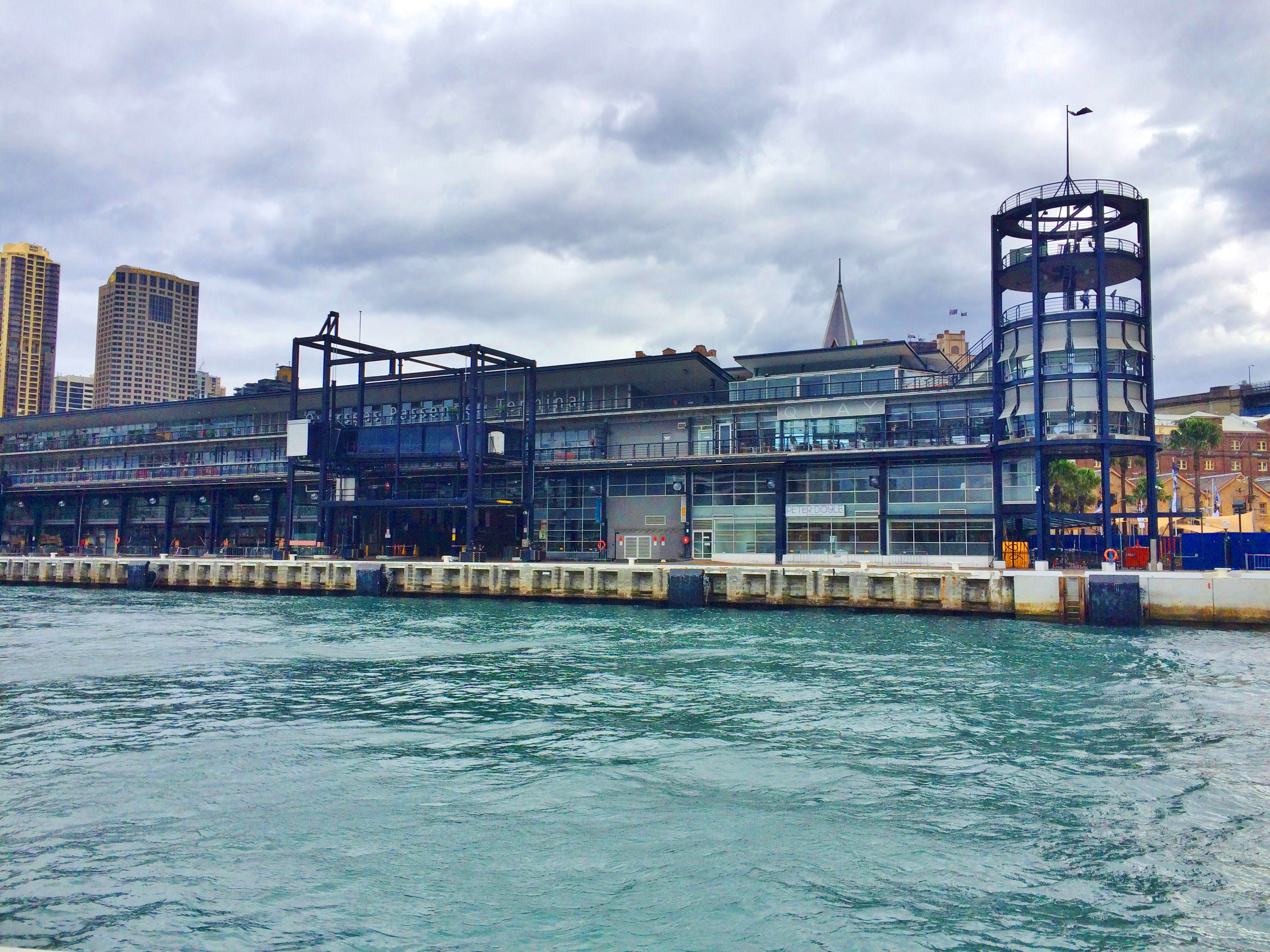
- Sydney Cove Passenger Terminal in April 2015
- Interactive map of the Overseas Passenger Terminal area
- Alternative names: OPT; Sydney Cove Passenger Terminal

General information
- Status: Completed
- Type: Wharf building
- Architectural style: Post-War International
- Location: Circular Quay west, 130 Argyle Street, The Rocks, Sydney, Australia
- Coordinates: 33.8580°S 151.2101°E
- Groundbreaking: 1956
- Construction started: 1958
- Completed: 1960
- Opened: 20 December 1960
- Renovated: 1988, 1996
- Cost: £1.75 million (1960) $63m (2024 value)
- Renovation cost: $46.7 million (1996)
- Owner: Port Authority of New South Wales (originally Maritime Services Board)

Technical details
- Structural system: Black Steel Portal Frame Truss
- Floor count: 2

Design and construction
- Architects: 1958 Maritime Services Board inhouse architects: R. Appleton, A. Buck and K. Brown; 1988 Lawrence Nield; 1988 Peter Tonkin; 1997 Bligh Voller Nield (BVN)
- Other designers: 2001 NSW Government Architect's Office; 2012 Architectus; 2012 Arup Group
- Awards: 1988 & 1997 RAIA Merit Award, Civic Design 1998 & 1997 RAIA Lloyd Rees Award for Urban Design

The Overseas Passenger Terminal (OPT), officially the Sydney Cove Passenger Terminal, is a passenger terminal located on the western side of Sydney Cove in New South Wales, Australia, which serves cruise ships and ocean liners. The terminal forms part of Circular Quay, which comprises the various public wharfs and promenades from The Rocks all the way around to the Sydney Opera House. Whilst commercial shipping operations at and around the site date from 1792, the existing passenger terminal and waterfront promenade date from 1958, with subsequent alterations and land reclamation continuing throughout the late 20th century. The current building retains the black steel portal frame trusses of the original 1958 structure, with major additions completed in 1988 in the Post-War International Style through the collaboration of Sydney-based architects Lawrence Nield and Peter Tonkin.

The building's main structure, the two remaining uniquely designed extendable gangways and an interior mural known as Foundations of European Settlement by Australian artist Arthur Murch are all listed as individual items of significance within the State Heritage Inventory by the New South Wales Heritage Office. Since 2006, the building and its surroundings have also been listed as part of the UNESCO World Heritage Site buffer zone for the Sydney Opera House.

Today, although there are other passenger terminals on Sydney Harbour, the OPT maintains a significant public role as the only major passenger terminal east of the Sydney Harbour Bridge. As such, it has been host to many major international cruise liners which are unable to clear the underside of the bridge, including the largest liner to dock at the OPT to date, the Ovation of the Seas. The OPT promenade and viewing platforms are open to the public when ships are not docked in the terminal and a series of dining and entertainment venues within the building serve as part of the OPT's secondary function.

== Location ==
The Overseas Passenger Terminal is located along the western edge of waterfront which frames Sydney Cove, also known as Circular Quay West and forms part of the promenade between Circular Quay station and First Fleet Park to the South and Campbell's Cove to the north. Its geographical location along the water's edge provides the structure with a clear, unobstructed view of two of Sydney's most recognisable icons, the Sydney Harbour Bridge and the Sydney Opera House. Its location also borders along the eastern edge of one of Sydney's earliest colonial settlement areas, known as The Rocks and today is on the border of a heritage conservation area which protects this historically significant zone.

== History ==
=== European colonisation ===
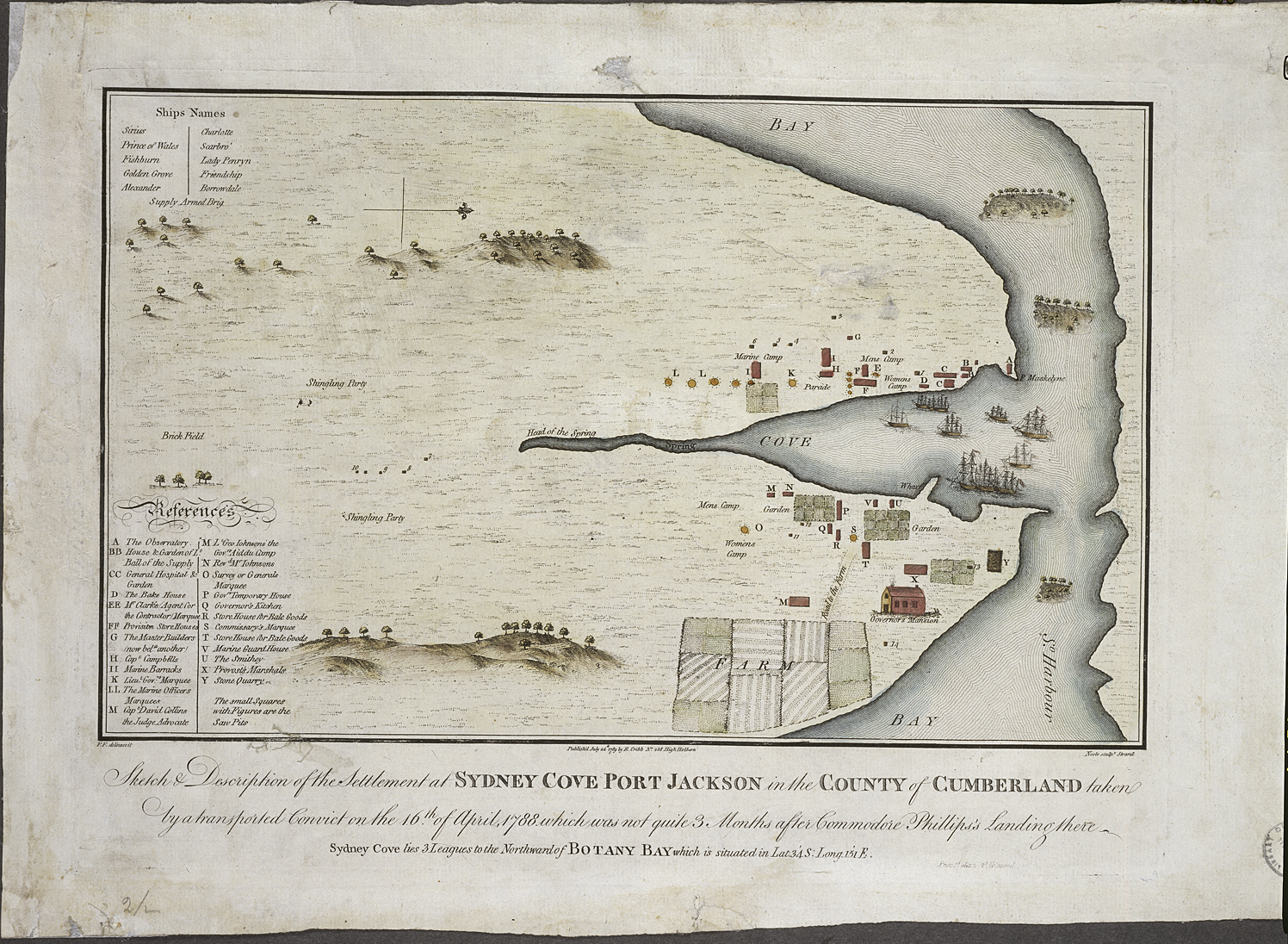
Location of the settlement of the First Fleet in Sydney Cove

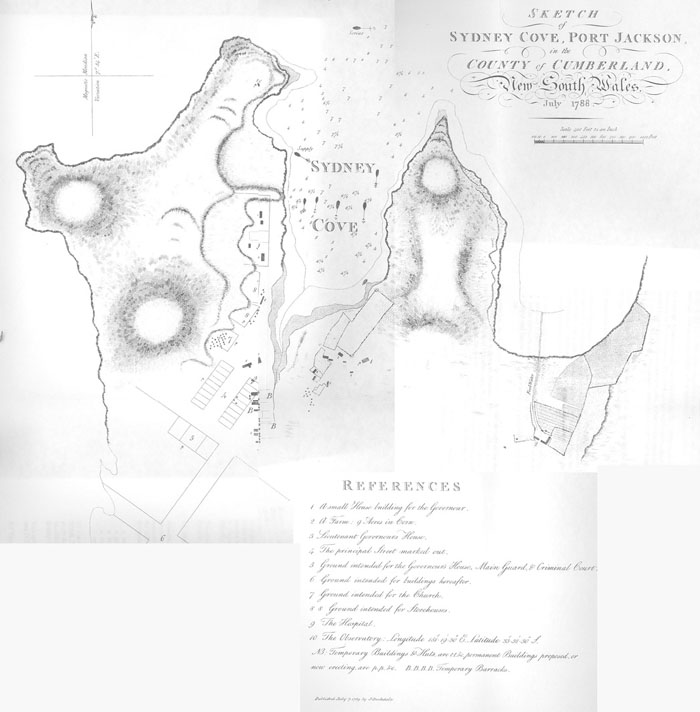
Early sketch of Colonial settlements around Sydney Cove

The current site of the Overseas Passenger Terminal was part of the Sydney Cove area and, following the arrival the First Fleet on 26 January 1788 under the direction of Arthur Philip, first Governor of the Penal Colony of New South Wales, Sydney Cove was chosen as the site of the new settlement.

=== Early development of west Circular Quay ===
The first wharf operations, primarily for trade and commercial purposes began in 1792, along the inner western edge of Sydney Cove, now in the vicinity of First Fleet Park and west of Circular Quay station. As the colony continued to mature and, coinciding with the development of trade and the discovery of gold in the 1850s, rapid development occurred around Sydney Cove, leading to new and larger warehouse stores and the beginnings of foreshore reclamation. One of the most prominent engineering works from this period is the Argyle Cut, a large open-cut passage through the contours of Sydney sandstone in the area and which formed an important transport link between The Rocks, Sydney Cove, Barangaroo and Darling Harbour, completed in 1859.

Sydney Cove, as with many of the surrounding harbours began originally as the site for commercial shipping. The first passenger ferry wharf was built in 1879 at the southern end of the Cove, approximately where the current Circular Quay wharves are located today. The site of the Overseas Passenger Terminal remained as a place for commercial shipping and dates back to an early linear timer wharf, built by the Sydney Harbour Trust. Constructed between 1900 and 1903, a series of warehouses and sheds were used by the shipping firm Norddeutscher Lloyd (Weber Lehmann & Co.) for commercial trade purposes.

=== Proposals for dedicated passenger ship terminal ===
Throughout the first half of the 20th century, the Port of Sydney was able to handle the stable 20,000–30,000 passengers arriving and departing annually. It was not until after World War II that a combination of high immigration, increased tourism and the rise of cruise shipping that passenger numbers increased and a new terminal at Sydney Cove was considered.

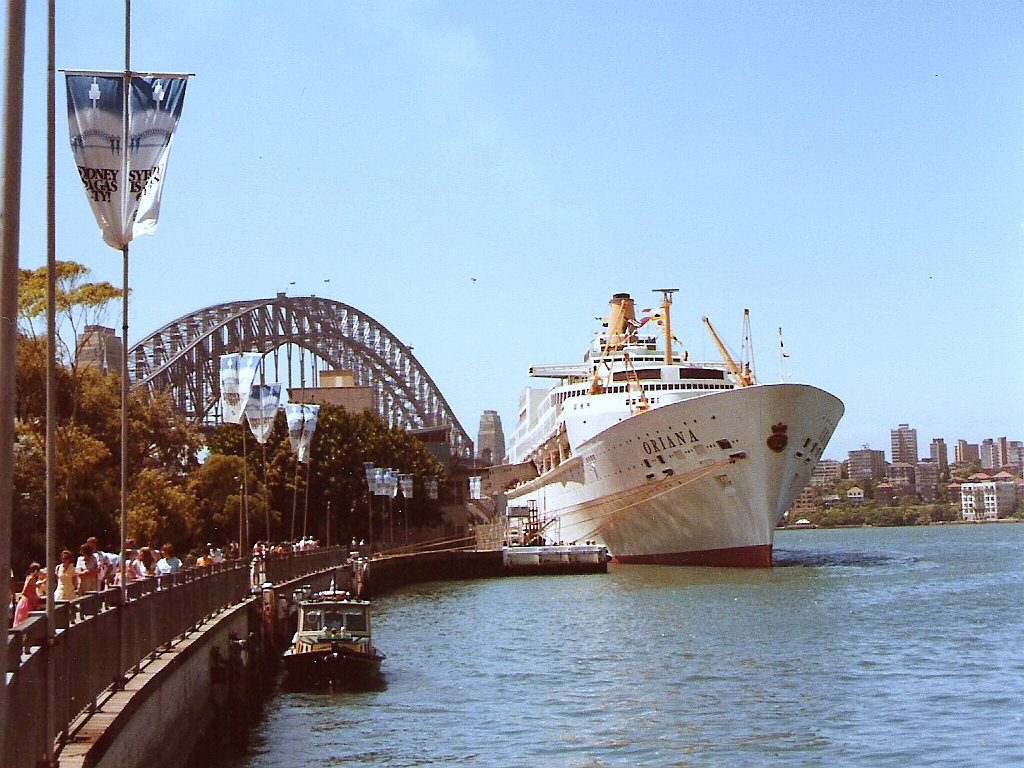
The Oriana moored at the Overseas Passenger Terminal in 1984

Running parallel to Post-War immigration and tourism, the growth and development of larger passenger ships meant that the construction of a dedicated cruise and ocean liner terminal became an infrastructural necessity. The terminals and stop-gap berths at Pyrmont, to the west of Sydney Cove were no longer accessible to all ships, as larger vessels were unable to clear the height of the road/rail platform of the Sydney Harbour Bridge (which had been completed in 1932). Based on these demands, waterfront running parallel to the historic Rocks warehouses was reclaimed for a new passenger terminal, on which the site of the current Overseas Passenger Terminal is still situated.

=== Construction and opening ===
Groundbreaking for the new passenger terminal began in 1956, construction began in 1958 and was completed in 1960 at a reported final cost of £1.75 million. Alongside the 500 guests in attendance, the opening was officiated by the then Deputy Premier of New South Wales, Treasurer and Minister for Lands, Jack Renshaw on 20 December 1960. Ten days after its official opening, the passenger terminal was host to its first passenger ship, the SS Oriana, which arrived on its maiden voyage from Southampton, England, carrying over 2,000 passengers.

=== Growth, decline and 1988 renovation ===
By the 1960s, the number of annual passenger arrivals and departures had more than quadrupled from 30,000 in the 1940s to 160,000 people in 1962. Whilst the passenger terminal remained an important transport hub in the decades subsequent to its completion, the long-term decline in passengers arriving by ocean liners (displaced by jet airliners) meant that by 1983, the Overseas Passenger Terminal structure lay virtually empty and was derelict.

As a result of this, the New South Wales Department of Public Works launched an ideas competition for the revitalisation and renovation of the terminal building. Eventually won by the conceptual work of Peter Tonkin (now of Tonkin Zulaikha Greer Architects), the project opened up the site to retail and restaurant opportunities, transforming the function of the terminal from purely infrastructure to a public place of meeting and entertainment. Introduction of these retail spaces, along with the opening of a new southern forecourt bounded by the bounding and surrounding heritage items were all part of a re-imagining and transformation of the Circular Quay West precinct from an infrastructural and commercial transport hub into a public waterfront promenade. These major renovations including the structural re-cladding and partial demolition were made by Tonkin in collaboration with prominent Australian architect Lawrence Nield and completed in 1988 for the Australian Bicentenary.

=== Developments since 1988 ===
Subsequent to the 1988 major renovations, several other major changes have occurred. These changes, once again involved Lawrence Nield, now of the large Sydney-based practice, Bligh Voller Nield (now known as BVN Donovan Hill), alongside the NSW Government Architect's Office and permitted increased public access as well as improvements to the passenger terminal facilities. These changes were once again well received and led subsequently to three more awards in civic and public architecture at the 1997 Australian Institute of Architects awards.

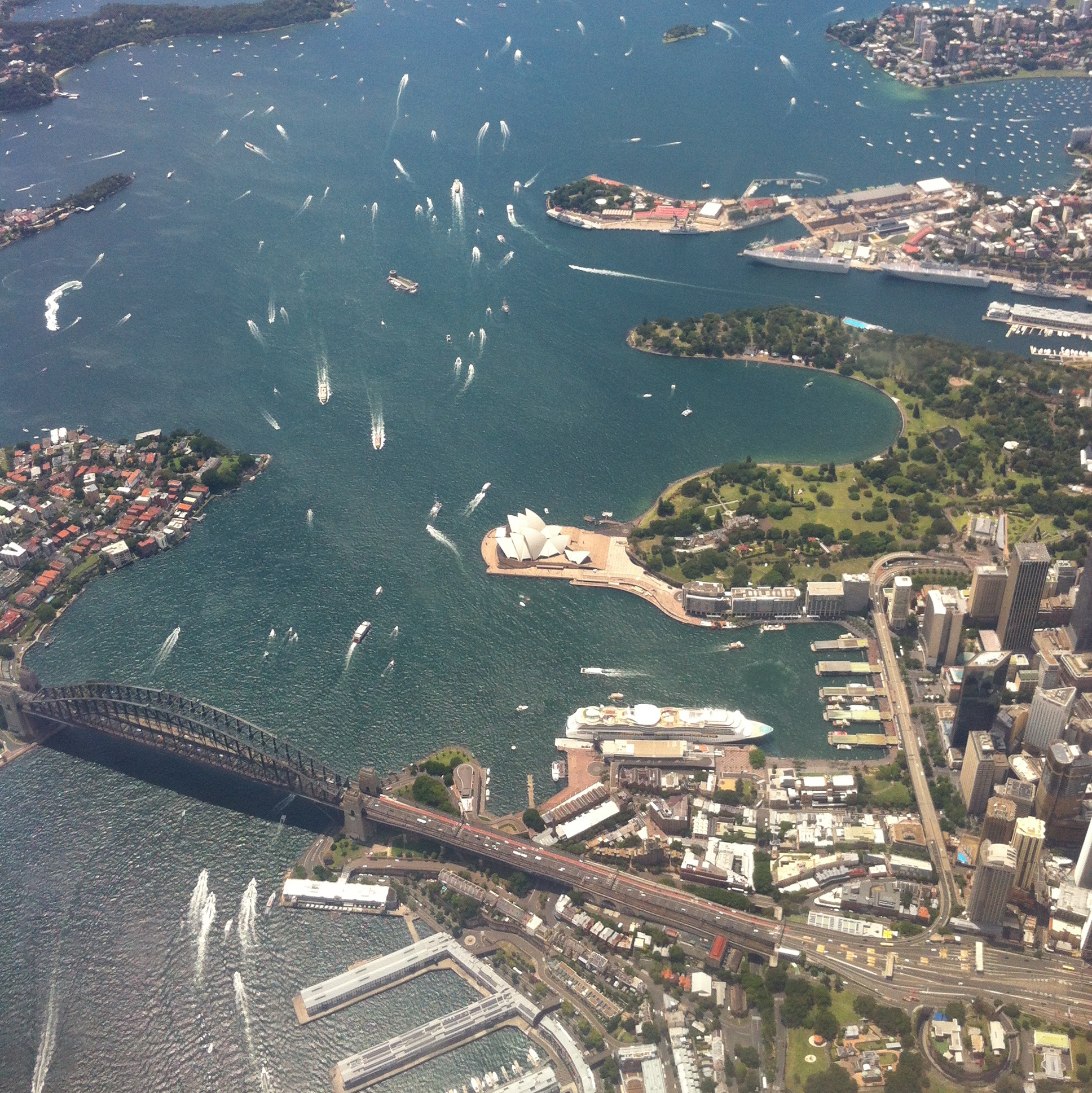
Radiance of the Seas moored at OPT in Sydney Harbour (centre right)

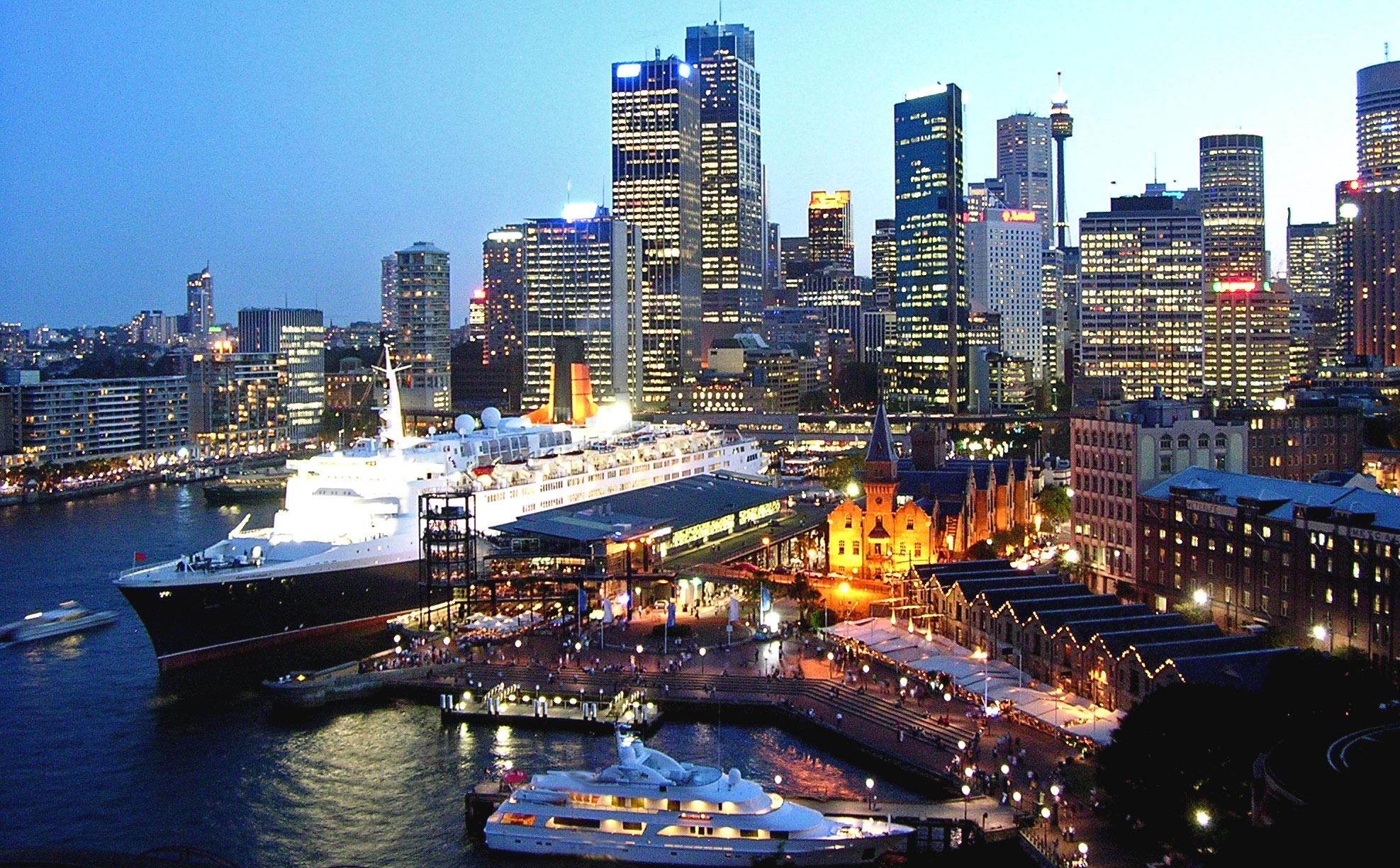
The Queen Elizabeth II moored at the OPT

After the millennium, another series of proposed changes to the OPT were unveiled in 2001 at the cost of $22 million including a re-organisation which provided outside dining, a licensed hotel and new restaurants, as well as replacement of 1988 escalators with elevators. Despite these changes early in the millennium, they were however considered insufficient as, since 2010, there has been notable significant resurgence in the popularity of cruise ships and ocean liner travel, resulting in significantly increased passenger capacity needs. A Passenger Cruise Terminal (PCT) Steering Committee, established in 2009 by the then New South Wales Government Minister for Planning, Kristina Keneally, advocated for a series of future plans and estimates for cruise ship capacity, including modifications to the Overseas Passenger Terminal and the design of a new terminal west of the Sydney Harbour Bridge, now known as the White Bay Cruise Terminal.

The PCT Steering Committee also highlighted that between 2002 and 2008, cruise ship berthing had grown at an annual rate of 18%, culminating in an estimated 250,000 passengers entering from the OPT. This, it was identified, resulted both from an increasing growth in the cruise ship industry as well as the increasing passenger capacity of vessels. The Ports Authority of New South Wales (formerly, Sydney Ports Authority) has also highlighted the importance changes necessary in the wake of rapid growth in the cruise ship industry and noted that passenger ships arriving in Sydney had nearly tripled from 119 in 2009/10 to 280 in 2014/15. The opening of the White Bay Cruise Terminal in Balmain East in August 2013, has helped to alleviate some of the congestion experienced by the Overseas Passenger Terminal. Despite this, the OPT remains to be the only commercial berth on the seaward (East) side of the Sydney Harbour Bridge, and continues to pose future operational challenges as its passenger handling capacity is due to be reached in 2016.

Running parallel to these developments, multi-disciplinary Australian architectural firm Architectus was selected in 2012 to complete a series of significant interior renovations, providing new spaces of movement as well as a revitalisation of pre-existing public spaces. The implementation of other changes from the 2012 masterplan are ongoing and as of August 2015, the community consultations page for the OPT upgrade, managed in part by the Ports Authority of New South Wales, has been continuing to provide regular updates of ongoing extended night working hours and proposed construction works.

Today, the ongoing renewals are part of a wider urban revitalisation project of the larger Circular Quay area, involving a range of developments from the CBD and South East Light Rail project to new walkways and public domains along Sydney's various waterfronts. Coordinated by the Sydney Harbour Foreshore Authority, these projects, including the OPT's upgrade program are managed and planned by the Circular Quay Inter-Agency Project Control Group.

In July 2019, two additional, custom-built walkways, carrying 5000 passengers each arrived at the OPT to support visits from future larger cruise ships. The NSW Government has placed these gangways in time for the 2019–2020 summer cruising season, and are projected to deliver around 1200 passengers every 30 minutes.

On 21 March 2022 it was announced that the NSW Port Authority would investigate the cost of installing shore power at the Overseas Passenger Terminal at the same time that they announced that the White Bay Cruise Terminal would have shore power from 2024.

=== Domestic and international heritage protection ===
Today, the site is not merely part of multiple heritage conservation listings, but since 2006, the waterfront of the Overseas Passenger Terminal has also become part of the buffer zone for the Sydney Opera House UNESCO World Heritage Site, with the heritage site report identifying that the area offered "critical views to and from the Sydney Opera House that contribute to its World Heritage Significance."

== Architecture ==
=== Design concept ===
The original 1960s passenger terminal was regarded as an eyesore, particularly as it was set in view of Sydney's most prominent waterfront. Since the revitalised building opened in 1988 however, it has been praised as one which increased public usage and access through a successful process of adaptive reuse. As a result, the building was also the winner of several prestigious Australian architectural prizes, presented by the Royal Australian Institute of Architects Awards (now known as the Australian Institute of Architects) in 1988.

The primary design concept for the 1988 alterations project was to express the original structure freely, with the strong row of black steel portal frames visible along the waterfront. As a result of this structural expression, the building can be broadly categorized as belonging to the Post-War International Style (Also known as Late 20th Century International Style) of architecture. The terminal's structural system has been identified within the State Heritage Register as "representative of the utilitarian approach to terminal design at the time, with its 'functionalist' character influenced by international trends." These trends of the 1980s are more specifically known as part of the 'high-tech' architecture movement, a term also applied to the work of international architects such as Norman Foster, Richard Rogers and Renzo Piano, whose works also dot the modern Sydney skyline. Architecture such as this emphasised a focus on the "poetics of structure, transparency and technology" and has its roots in the era of Victorian Industrial Revolution in the United Kingdom, most prominently being the Crystal Palace (1851) designed by Joseph Paxton.

=== Architectural elements ===
==== Concrete caissons ====
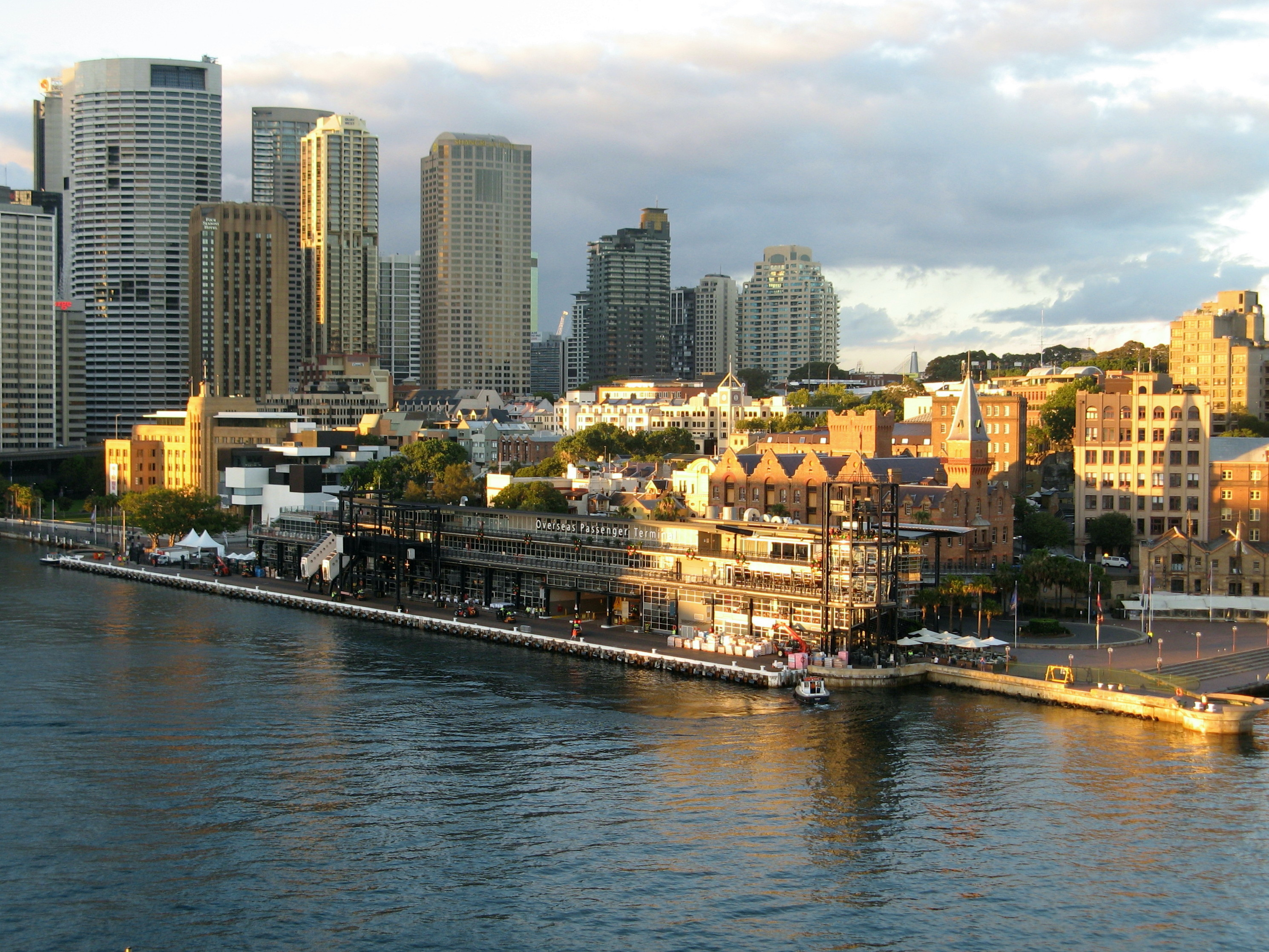
The Overseas Passenger Terminal in December 2013, prior to the wharf extension.

The statement of significance in the New South Wales State Heritage Register for the OPT notes that the building demonstrates "an early use of concrete caisson technology as foreshore reinforcement." These reinforced concrete caissons were then used to create a 720-foot long seawall (220m), which was backfilled to reclaim the area. The original building allowed a 40 ft (12 m) apron to the Cove and was 625 by 111 ft (191 by 34 m). The resulting foreshore allowed for vehicular access along the waterfront as well as cargo transfer and passenger embarkation.

The revitalised 1988 project allowed for the first time this waterfront space to become part of a publicly accessible waterfront promenade, when ships are not docked at the OPT and which joins to an extended walkway from the Opera House and around Circular Quay. In 2000, this waterfront was further enhanced through minor foundation works and refurbishment. More recently, a second alterations project involved extending the north eastern section of the existing wharf by approximately 60 metres. This provided both additional wharf space to service vessels moored at the OPT as well as increasing the waterfront promenade open space by 1,000 square metres.

==== Black steel portal frame truss ====
The steel columns of the OPT are tapered and curve upwards to join steel beams, welded with steel web stiffeners and holding the suspended concrete slabs for the main passenger terminal level. The architect, Lawrence Neild has himself described the expression of structure as "an architectural metamorphosis that uncovered the rugged plate web steel structure and added a round tower framed with rolled I-beams and channels. The steel feels heavy and immovable against the floating ships." This primary steel structure is set back from the water's edge, providing for the large cantilevered extendable gangways between the building and ship main decks as well as providing logistical and transportation access along the waterfront. In the original 1988 project, twin splayed escalators, which have since been demolished, were located at the southern end and made the circulation pattern comprehensible, providing a generous entrance area adjacent to Cadmans Cottage.

Internally, the steel structure has allowed for the building's wide uninterrupted spaces and large exterior glass curtain-walls, providing a direct view of the Sydney Opera House, which lies to the east, directly across Sydney Cove. Under the proposed changes of the 2012 Architectus $25 Million masterplan, a reconsideration of the circulation and arrival/departure halls of the Overseas Passenger Terminal involved reorganising the interior spaces to "offer greater flexibility and cater for usage over the next thirty to forty years."

==== Extendible gangways ====
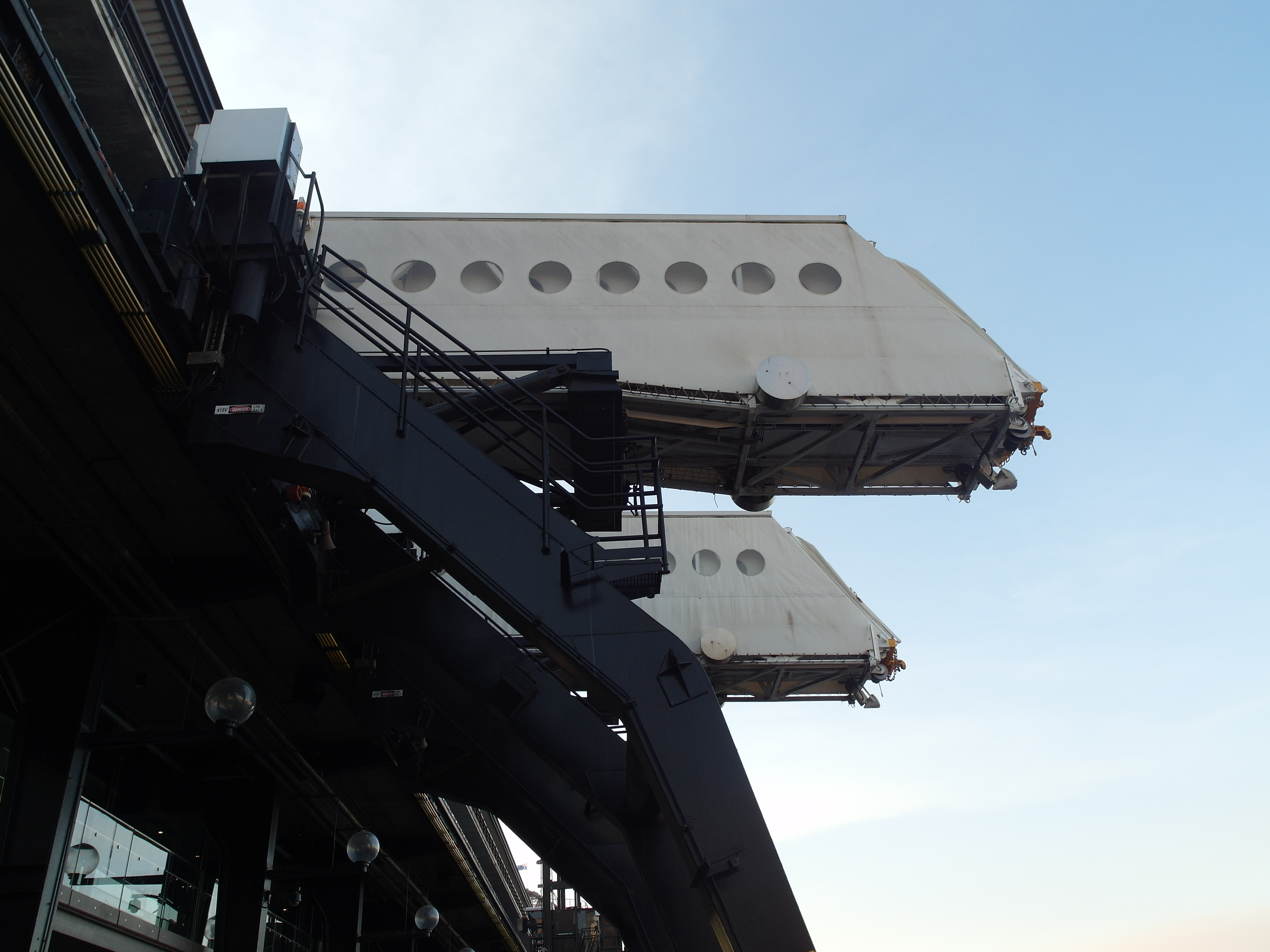
Original Extendable Gangways of the OPT Building. Currently retracted, they were removed in 2018.

The Overseas Passenger Terminal's two extendible gangways, designed specifically for the building are listed as items of state heritage significance in New South Wales, independently of the main terminal structure. These structures are unique and were specifically designed for use at the OPT. In its original state, there were five of these extendible gangways attached to the terminal. During the 1988 refurbishment two of these extendible gangways were removed and relocated to the Wharf 13 at Pyrmont and Wharf 10 at Darling Harbour.

One criticism of the two remaining extendible gangways highlighted that while "the industrial nature of the gantries contributes to the aesthetic significance of the building, the overall form and covering ... detracts from the artistic expression of the current Overseas Passenger Terminal design."

==== Special modifications ====
In order to handle the increasing size of ocean liners, new mooring systems have been introduced to allow successful berthing of these vessels. Most significantly was a special temporary mooring system, designed and implemented by engineering firm Arup Group in 2012 to allow the mooring of the Queen Mary II. This involved a series of temporary drag anchors to be installed on the seabed around Campbell's Cove and the passenger terminal to take the ship's bow lines. This temporary system has subsequently been kept for larger vessels to moor, pending the design and implementation of a more permanent design. As a result of this temporary mooring system's success, a permanent new mooring dolphin with both fixed above-water pile and a concrete deck mooring structure was introduced adjacent to Campbell's Cove to the north of the OPT.

==== Facilities ====
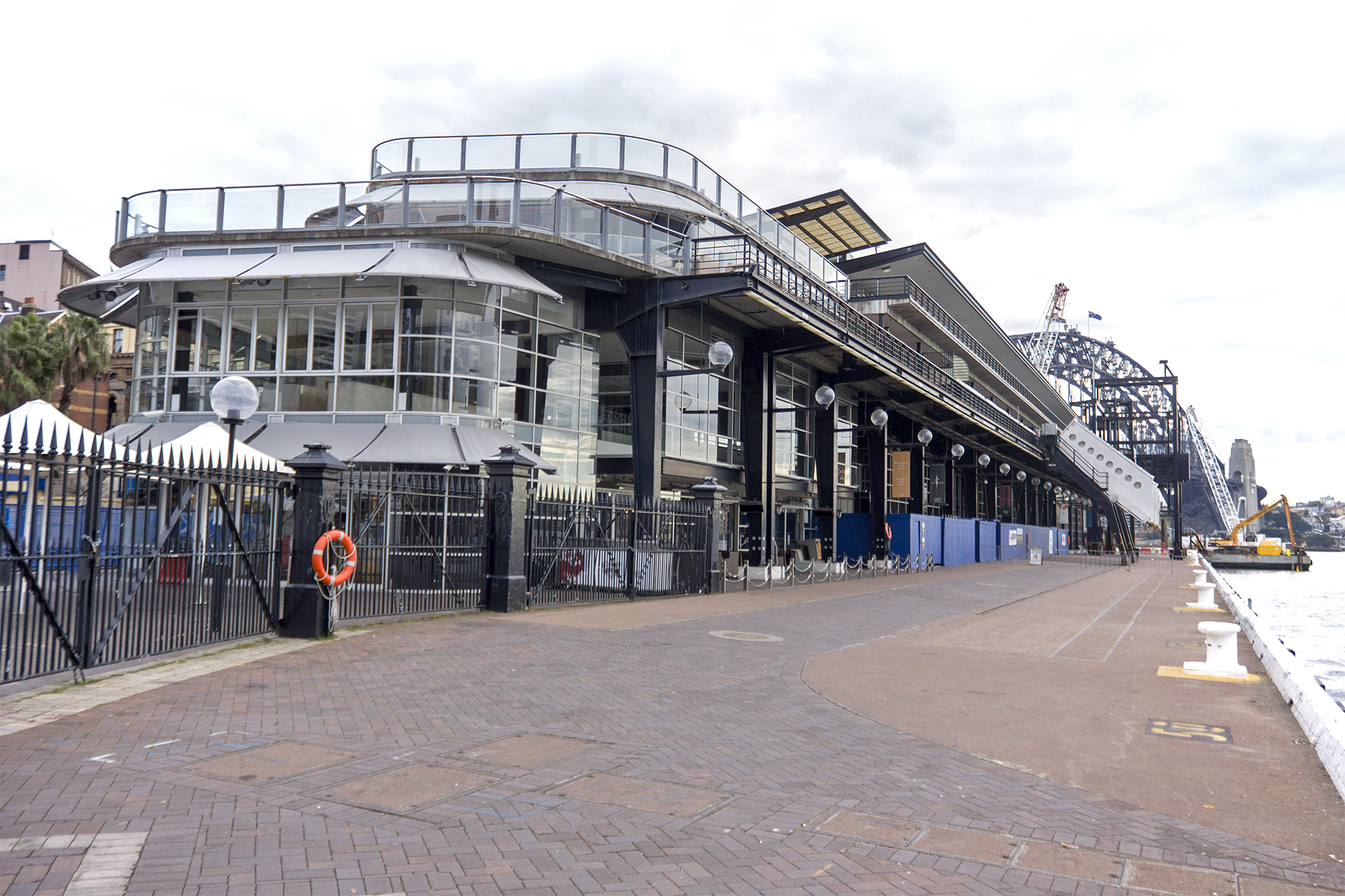
Overseas Passenger Terminal in June 2014

When first completed in the 1960s, the ground floor was dedicated to cargo, while the first floor contained customs and passenger facilities. Since the 1988 major alterations project, the Overseas Passenger Terminal has transformed from this original dual function to a wholly passenger embarkation facility. In addition to this, the OPT today also serves as a combination of passenger handling, events venue, entertainment and public observation spaces. Some of the new facilities introduced include:

- The Southern Forecourt – A large open public space adjacent to the main entrance of the OPT.
- The Southern Entry Plaza & Observation Deck – An above ground observation deck which defines the southern edge of the building.
- The Rotunda Observation Platform – A steel structure offering panoramic views of the harbour at the northern tip of the building.
- The Customs Hall – A dominant space of the OPT, offering a free plan layout for customs facilities. When ships are not moored, the space is also open for public hire.
- Coach & Bus Setdown – A cantilevered bridge which provides a direct access from George Street and Hickson Road to the fourth floor departure hall

=== Interior mural ===
Like most of the original 1960s fabric, little of the original interior remains as a result of multiple alterations projects. One of the most significant interiors which dates from the original passenger terminal is a fifteen-metre mural known as Foundation of European Settlement, painted by 20th-century Australian artist Arthur Murch and listed as an item of local significance by the Ports Authority of New South Wales Heritage Division. The oil painting, located on the north wall of the Customs hall is painted on a series of compressed wood fibre panels and assembled together on a timber framework. Given the sloping interior roof form, the maximum height of the mural is 13 feet 10 inches (4.22 metres) and slopes along the top edge to 5 feet 7 inches (1.70 metres).

The NSW Maritime Services Board commissioned Murch to paint the mural for the new passenger terminal shortly after its opening in the 1960s. The artwork was completed over a three-year period through the additional assistance of Murch's wife, Ria Murch and two helpers, David Schulunke and Helga Lanzendorfer. The artwork depicts two events surrounding the foundation of European settlement in Australia. Specifically, "it is a symbolic portrayal of two episodes, the flag raising ceremony held on 26th January 1788 and the subsequent landing of the women, children, baggage and farm implements during the next ten days." The mural was unveiled on 1 February 1963 by W D Donaldson, a Nominated Commissioner of the Maritime Services Board.

As part of the upgrades and renovations in the early 2000s, art conservator David Stein was appointed with conserving the mural which at the time, had been severely damaged due to water and moisture. Actively flaking paint, as a result of the swelled timber panels and other damage was arrested and stabilised one panel at a time, whilst a process of cosmetic retouching occurs. Today, the mural is still situated within the Customs Hall and serves as the first herald for people entering Sydney from the Overseas Passenger Terminal.

=== Architectural awards ===
- 1983 Overseas Passenger Terminal Competition First Prize and commission
- 1988 & 1997 Royal Australian Institute of Architects Merit Award, Walter Burley Griffin Award for Urban Design
- 1988 & 1997 Royal Australian Institute of Architects Lloyd Rees Award for Urban Design

== Current usage ==
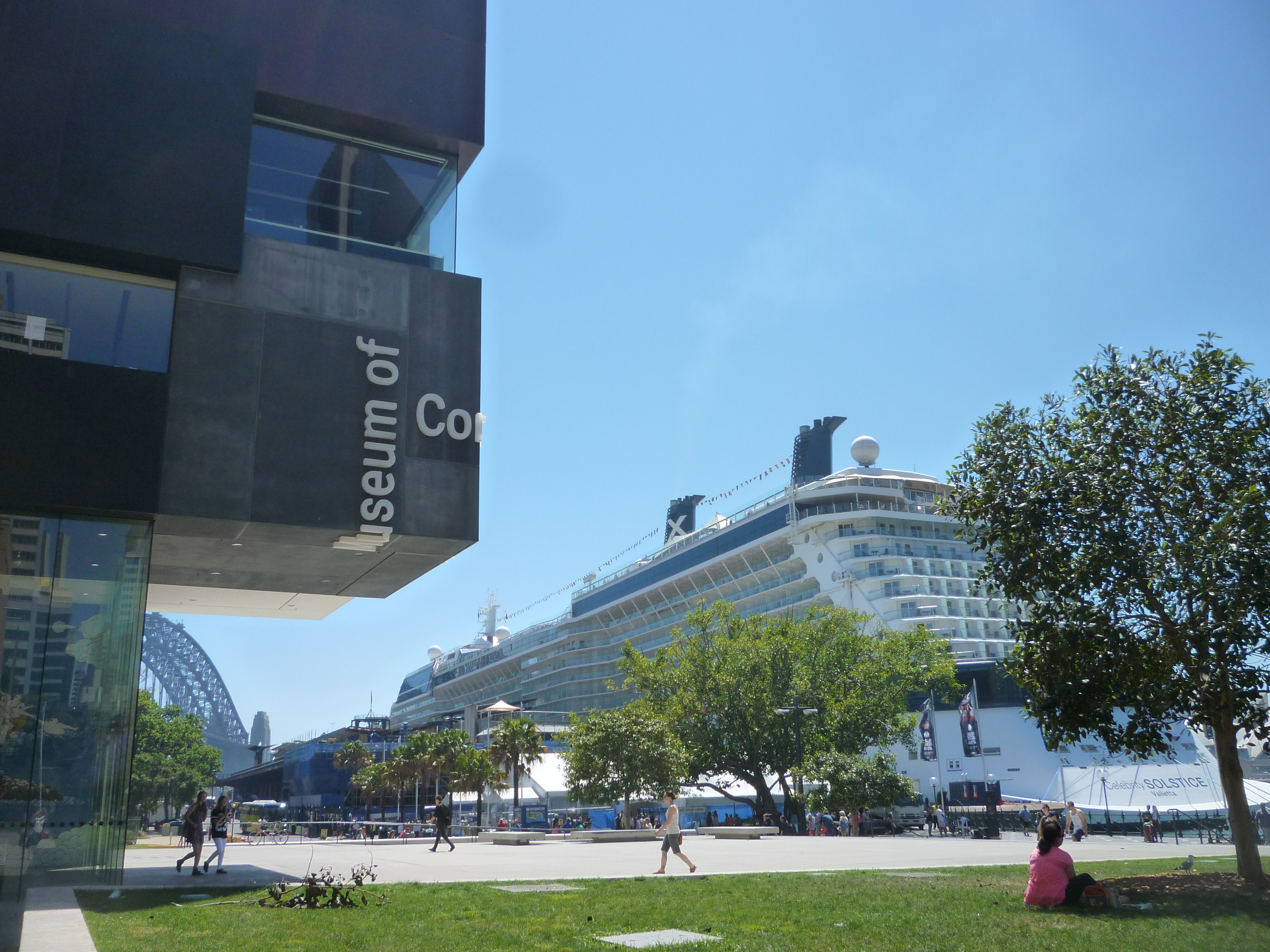
Celebrity Solstice docked at the OPT (2014)

=== Stakeholders and management ===
Various parties are responsible for the commercial venues, site management and day-to-day operations of the cruise terminal. Among them are a mix of private firms as well as government departments and quasi-autonomous government entities which permeates through local, state and federal levels of governance in Australia. With these many affiliations, interests and governance and management authorities affecting the OPT and its surrounding public space, an Inter-agency Project Control (IPC) Group for Circular Quay has been established by the Sydney Harbour Foreshore Authority to oversee and manage the operations and upgrade works.

Some of these stakeholders include:

- Port Authority of New South Wales
- Ports Australia
- Sydney Harbour Foreshore Authority
- City of Sydney (Local Government Area) Council
- Transport for NSW (formerly Roads & Maritime Services)
- Australian Border Force (enforcement of immigration controls)
- Harbour Masters (Venue Management) Pty Ltd

=== Terminal day-to-day operation ===
The Overseas Passenger Terminal is host to both international and domestic cruise ships and liners. As a result of this, the Customs Hall, located within the OPT building is sometimes subject to immigration regulations and controls, managed by the Australian Border Force. Temporary spaces within the Customs Hall are prepared when a cruise ship is moored to allow ABF officers to screen passengers, providing health questionnaires, outbound/inbound passenger cards and passport controls. Since the millennium upgrades, the efficiency and capacity of the OPT has been significantly improved, allowing for an average turn-over of 4,000 passengers within the course of a single day.

The management of the terminal building and the timetable of arrivals and departures for cruise ships is managed by the Ports Authority of New South Wales. There is a strict curfew for large vessel arrivals and departures currently in place. Between the hours 07:00-09:30 and 16:00-18:30, large vessels are generally not permitted to arrive or depart from the OPT terminal, so as not to affect rush hour wharf traffic in Sydney Harbour and more specifically, the Circular Quay ferry wharves.

==== Notable cruise ship arrivals ====
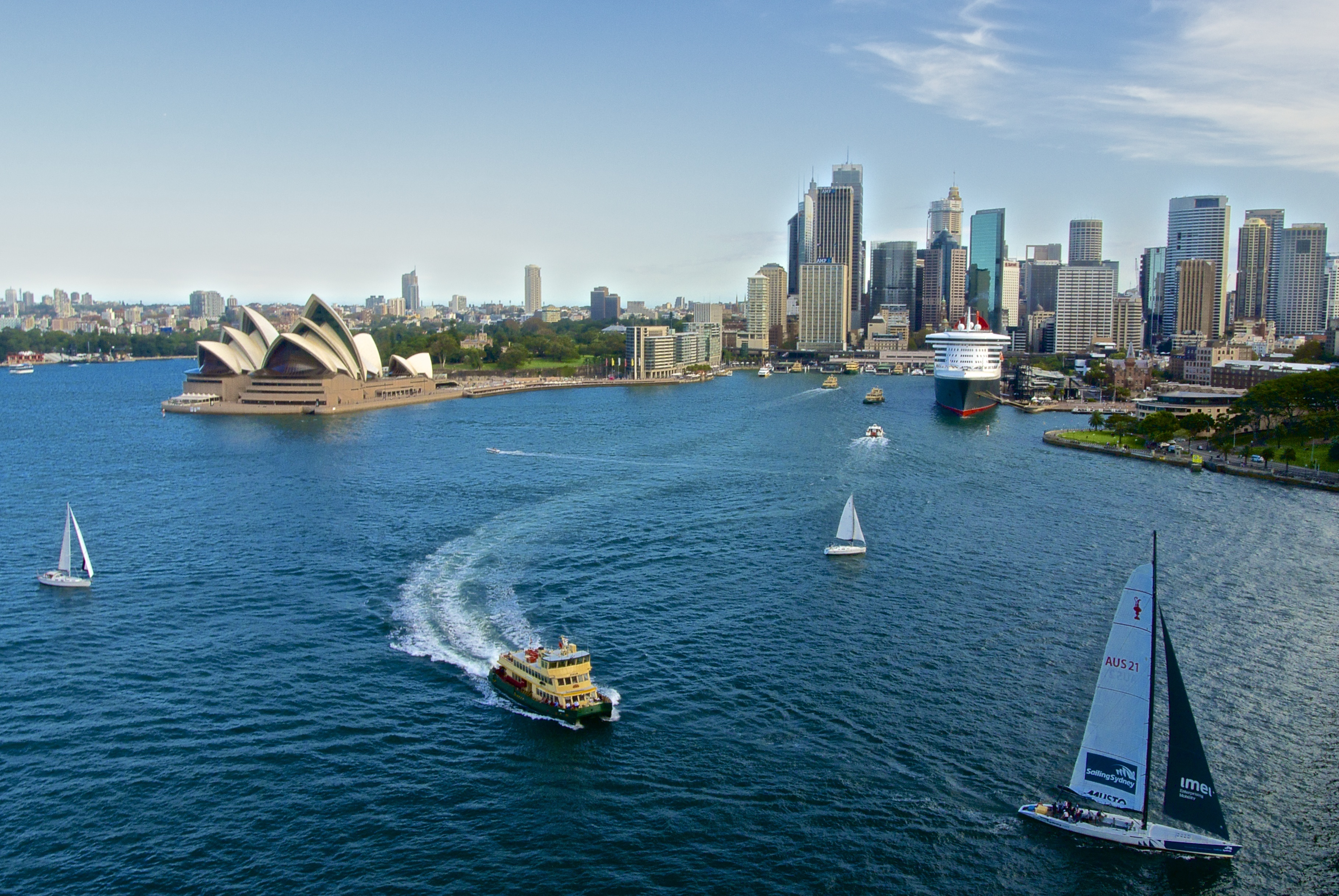
The Queen Mary II docked at the OPT in Sydney Cove

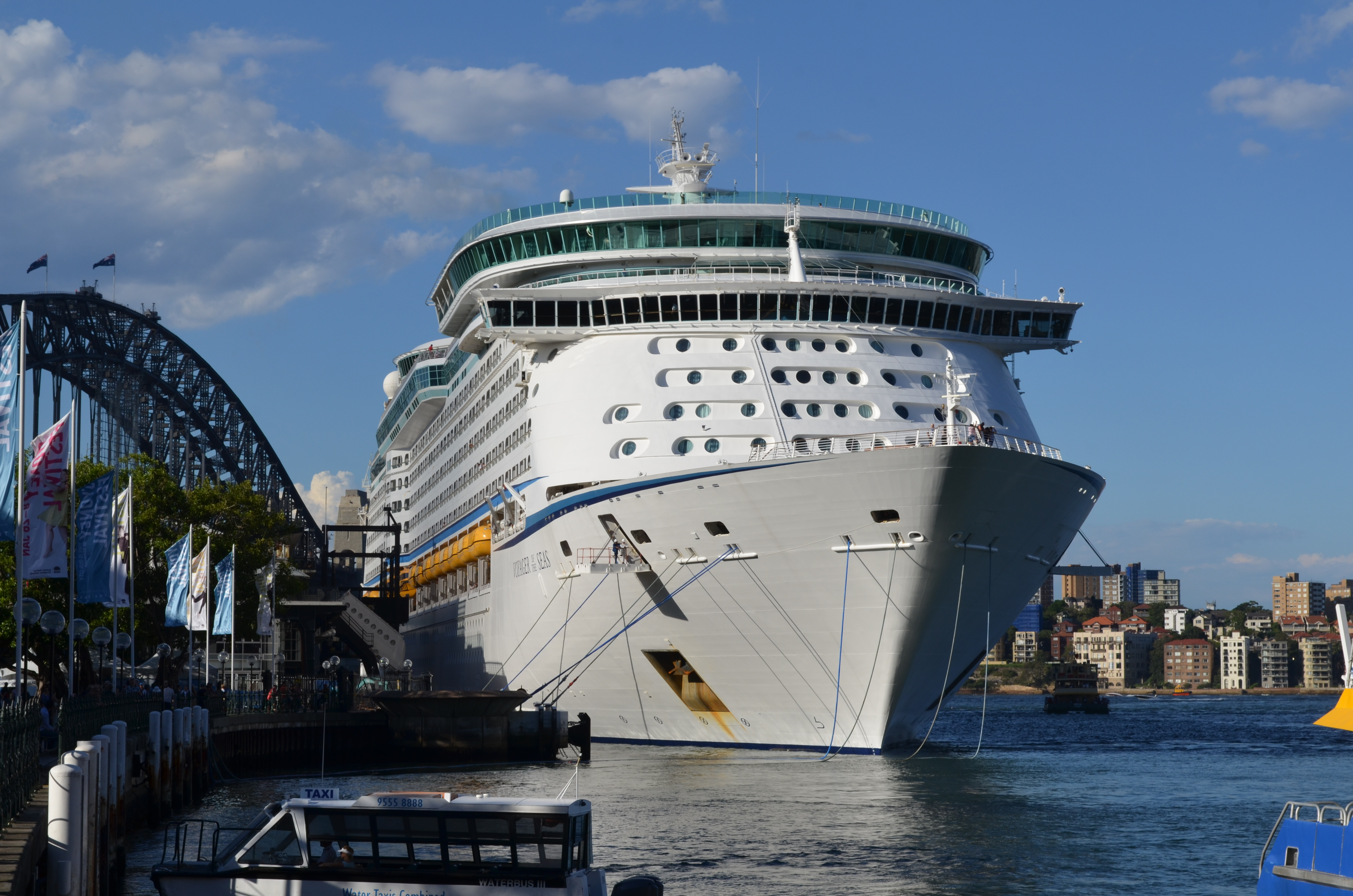
With a passenger change of over 6,000, the Voyager of the Seas was the single largest turn-over for the OPT until 2016

Since the completion of major renovations in the early 2000s, the OPT has been host to cruise liners of ever increasing capacity and sizes. Two significant milestones were achieved in 2012, the first of which was the result of increased mooring capabilities which allowed the Queen Mary II to successfully dock on 7 March 2012. Shortly after this success, the Voyager of the Seas with a maximum ocupancy of 4,000 guests, made her maiden voyage to Sydney, docking at the OPT and within a single day, involved a turn-over of 6,600 passengers, the single largest one-day turnover to date. That was until the arrival of the MS Ovation of the Seas in 2016. which has a maximum occupancy of 4,905 passengers and currently, at a length of 348 metres, remains to be the largest ship to be moored adjacent to the terminal.

=== Public venue and other usages ===
Whilst the primary operation of the OPT is to serve as a cruise terminal infrastructure building, the 1988 and subsequent renovations have also provided for additional public recreation opportunities and spaces. In particular, the new southern forecourt in front of Cadmans Cottage has also become a new public gathering space along the waterfront. This site served as the primary location for news media coverage and the scene of public celebrations on 24 September 1993, when it was announced by the International Olympic Committee of the time that Sydney would be the host of the 2000 Summer Olympics.

When cruise ships are not moored at the OPT, restricted spaces along the entire waterfront promenade, is opened for public access, providing an uninterrupted walk along the water's edge from Circular Quay to Campbell's Cove. Toward the north elevation of the structure, the 1988 additions also provided new public observation decks with unobstructed panoramic views over Circular Quay and Sydney Harbour.

When spaces such as the customs hall and central forecourt are not closed for passenger shipping use, they are managed by a private venues management company and utilised as exhibition and venue spaces open for public hire. Over the years, these spaces have been host to a series of significant local and international events, including providing art installation spaces for the annual Vivid Sydney Festival and previously, as a catwalk for the Sydney Fashion Week in 2012. Also located in the OPT is the Quay Restaurant, which between 2010 and 2018 sold more than 500,000 of the cult classic "Snow Egg" dessert created by Executive Chef Peter Gilmore.

=== Transport links ===
While the passenger terminal includes parking facilities, the primary public transport links are located south of the Overseas Passenger Terminal, at Circular Quay. The area is a transport hub with connections for commuter heavy rail services from Circular Quay railway station, commuter ferry services from Circular Quay ferry wharf, light rail services from the Circular Quay stop on the CBD and South East Light Rail, and buses. Sightseeing boat services also operate from Circular Quay. It is also common that a large number of Sydney tours for main tourist attractions leave the overseas passenger terminal during the busy months of December, January and February.

== See also ==
- Gold Fields House
- Campbell's Stores
