= Attica (restaurant) =

Coordinates: 37.8770°S 144.9973°E

- Interactive map of Attica

Restaurant information
- Owner: Ben Shewry
- Previous owners: Helen Maccora, David Maccora
- Head chef: Ben Shewry
- Food type: Modern Australian cuisine
- Location: 74 Glen Eira Road, Ripponlea, Victoria, Melbourne, 3185, Australia
- Website: www.attica.com.au

Attica is a fine-dining restaurant in Ripponlea, a suburb of Melbourne, Australia. Owned and operated by Ben Shewry, it specialises in a multi-course tasting menu focused on native Australian ingredients. The restaurant has appeared on The World's 50 Best Restaurants list every year since 2010 and is consistently ranked as the top restaurant in Australia.

== History ==
Attica was opened in 2003 by Dr David Maccora, an emergency physician, and his wife Helen, in a converted suburban bank building on Glen Eira Road in Ripponlea. After two chefs failed to attract sufficient patronage, the Maccoras appointed Ben Shewry — formerly at Circa in St Kilda — as head chef in 2005, giving him full creative control of the menu. In January 2015, the Maccoras sold the restaurant to Shewry, making him the sole owner and operator.

In 2025, the restaurant marked twenty years since Shewry's appointment as head chef.

== Philosophy and cuisine ==
Attica's menu is built around native Australian ingredients, including bunya nuts, finger limes and foraged herbs, many of which are sourced from the neighbouring Rippon Lea Estate. Shewry has described his approach as offering a taste of Australia that cannot be replicated anywhere else in the world. Dishes are often informed by Australian Indigenous knowledge, personal experiences, and local stories, with Shewry seeking cultural permission before incorporating Indigenous narratives into his cooking.

The restaurant describes its approach as "ambitious dining" rather than fine dining, and places emphasis on warmth and informality in service alongside technical precision in the kitchen.

In 2024, Shewry published a memoir, Uses for Obsession, which examines the culture of professional kitchens, critiques toxic elements of the awards and ranking system in hospitality, and advocates for kindness and transparency in the industry.

In 2025, Shewry publicly announced that he no longer consents to Attica being reviewed by critics, citing his concerns about the impact of the review and awards culture on the restaurant industry and the wellbeing of hospitality workers.

== Recognition ==
=== The World's 50 Best Restaurants ===
Attica has appeared on The World's 50 Best Restaurants list every year since 2010. The restaurant reached its highest position of 20th in 2018. It is consistently ranked as the highest-placed Australian restaurant on the list.

=== Chef's hats ===
Attica held a three-hat rating from the Australian Good Food Guide from 2008. As of 2025, the restaurant holds two hats from the Good Food Guide.

=== Other awards ===
- Gourmet Traveller Restaurant of the Year: 2015, 2019
- The Age Good Food Guide Restaurant of the Year: 2022
- Wine List of the Year (Gourmet Traveller Wine): 2020

=== Documentary series ===
Attica was featured in the inaugural season of the Netflix documentary series Chef's Table in 2015, which brought significant international attention to the restaurant and to Shewry's approach to Australian cuisine.

=== B Corporation certification ===
In February 2024, Attica became a certified B Corporation, one of approximately 45 food and restaurant businesses globally to hold the certification at that time. The certification reflects the restaurant's commitments to environmental sustainability, fair labour practices, and social responsibility.

== See also ==
- List of restaurants in Australia
