= Gourmet Traveller =

Australian magazine

- Cover of the September 2024 issue
- Editor: Joanna Hunkin
- Categories: Food magazine Travel magazine
- Frequency: Monthly
- Founded: 1966
- Company: Are Media
- Country: Australia
- Based in: Sydney
- Language: English
- Website: gourmettraveller.com.au

Australian Gourmet Traveller is a monthly magazine owned by the Australian media company Are Media. It was founded in 1966 as The Australian Gourmet Magazine and changed multiple names before acquiring the current title in 1988. Circulation in 1999 was about 80,000 copies as the magazine re-oriented to cover the local food options. While dominating in Australia in 1990s, its positions have been threatened in the 2000s, as many new titles have appeared (like Delicious in 2002) .

Each issue of the magazine includes multiple food and wine articles, reviews of the restaurants, recipes and interviews. Half the space is occupied by the advertisements. There is also a travel section with 3–5 short articles emphasising food.

== Restaurant of the Year ==
Year	Location	Winner	Reference
2008	Rose Bay	Pier	
2009	Overseas Passenger Terminal	Quay	
2010	Overseas Passenger Terminal	Quay	
2011	Fitzroy	Cutler & Co	
2012	Surry Hills	Porteño	
2013	Overseas Passenger Terminal	Quay	
2014	Sydney	Momofuku	
2015	Ripponlea	Attica	
2016	Sydney	Rockpool	
2017	Sydney	Momofuku	
2018	Adelaide	Orana	
2019	Overseas Passenger Terminal	Quay	
2020	Ripponlea	Attica	
2021	Red Hill	Tedesca Osteria	
2022	Red Hill	Tedesca Osteria	
2023	Fortitude Valley	Agnes	

== Sources ==
- Barnes, Lyn (8 April 2020). "Case Study: Culinary Magazines in Oceania and Australia". The Handbook of Magazine Studies. Wiley. pp. 453–461. doi:10.1002/9781119168102.ch35. ISBN 978-1-119-15152-4.
- Wilson, Erica (31 October 2010). "Beyond beans and cheese: representations of food, travel and Mexico City in the Australian Gourmet Traveller" (PDF). TEXT. 14 (Special 9). doi:10.52086/001c.31524. ISSN 1327-9556.
- Rolfe, Dominic (December 2014). "Extracurricular: A gastronomic practice". Law Society Journal (7). Law Society of New South Wales: 48–49.
