= Peter Gilmore (chef) =

Australian chef (born 1968)

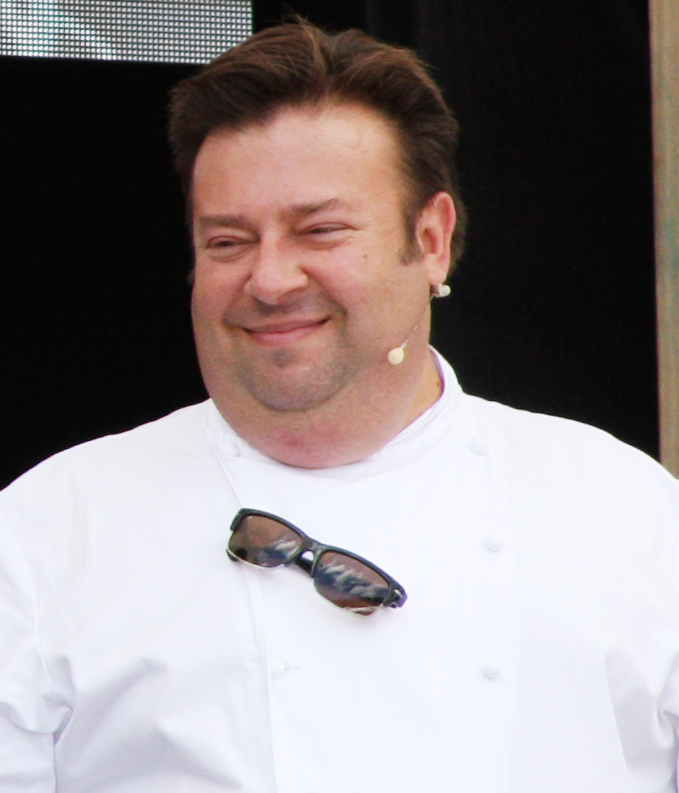
- Gilmore in 2012
- Born: 18 May 1968 (age 58); Sydney, Australia
- Occupations: Chef, restaurateur
- Known for: Executive Chef of Quay

Peter Gilmore (born 18 May 1968) is an Australian chef. He was executive chef of the Quay restaurant for 11 years, closing the doors in February 2026. Quay was included in The World's 50 Best Restaurants since 2009, .

Gilmore was also Executive Chef at Bennelong, at the Sydney Opera House.

Gilmore is now developing a new venture in Southern Tasmania from his farm at Flowerpot.

Gilmore is also a recurring guest on Masterchef Australia, where his signature dessert the "Snow Egg" was touted as one of the toughest Masterchef challenges.

== Career ==
He was inspired to cook at a young age and started his apprenticeship at 16, then spent his twenties working in kitchens overseas and in New South Wales, developing his own style. Critical recognition came in 2000 when Peter was the Head Chef at De Beers Restaurant at Whale Beach and Terry Durack, food reviewer for The Sydney Morning Herald, wrote "De Beers houses a young chef with a real talent for sending out beautifully structured food with innate simplicity".

== Style ==
Across both of his restaurants, Chef Gilmore describes his cuisine as food inspired by nature and as a passionate gardener himself, he was one of the first chefs in Australia to embrace heirloom varieties of vegetables, and continues to work in partnership with small and artisan producers who cultivate bespoke produce exclusively for both Quay and Bennelong. Chef Gilmore collaborates with a range of producers across New South Wales and also Australia, from the fishermen who hand dive and line catch the seafood he serves to the farmers who rear rare breed animals with superior flavour and texture for the table.

== Awards ==
Since taking the helm in the kitchen at Quay, the restaurant was listed for five years in the World’s 50 Best Restaurants and most recently in 2015 was placed at 58th in the World’s 100 Best Restaurants. Quay has been awarded Three Chefs Hats for 18 consecutive years and named Restaurant of the Year six times in The Sydney Morning Herald Good Food Guide. It has three stars for 18 years and has been awarded Restaurant of the Year three times in the Australian Gourmet Traveller Restaurant Guide.

In November 2014, The Fink Group was awarded the coveted 10-year tender of the iconic Bennelong Restaurant at the Sydney Opera House. Under the helm of Gilmore, the new restaurant opened on 1 July 2015 with a tri-level layout and showcases the flavour, diversity and quality of Australian produce.

== Personal life ==
Gilmore was born and bred in Sydney, During his teen years he attended Cumberland High School. He is married to Kath and they have two sons.

== Publications ==
- Gilmore, Peter (2010) Quay: Food Inspired by Nature, ISBN 9781741964875
- Gilmore, Peter (2014) Organum: Nature, Texture, Intensity, Purity
- The Peter Gilmore App (2014).
- Gilmore, Peter (2018) From The Earth: World’s Great, Rare and Almost Forgotten Vegetables
