= Fred Rhodes =

Fred Rhodes may refer to:

- Fred Rhodes (footballer)
- Fred Rhodes (writer)

== See also ==
- Frederick Parker-Rhodes, English linguist, plant pathologist, computer scientist and mathematician
