= SS Barcoo =

Passenger Ship built in 1885

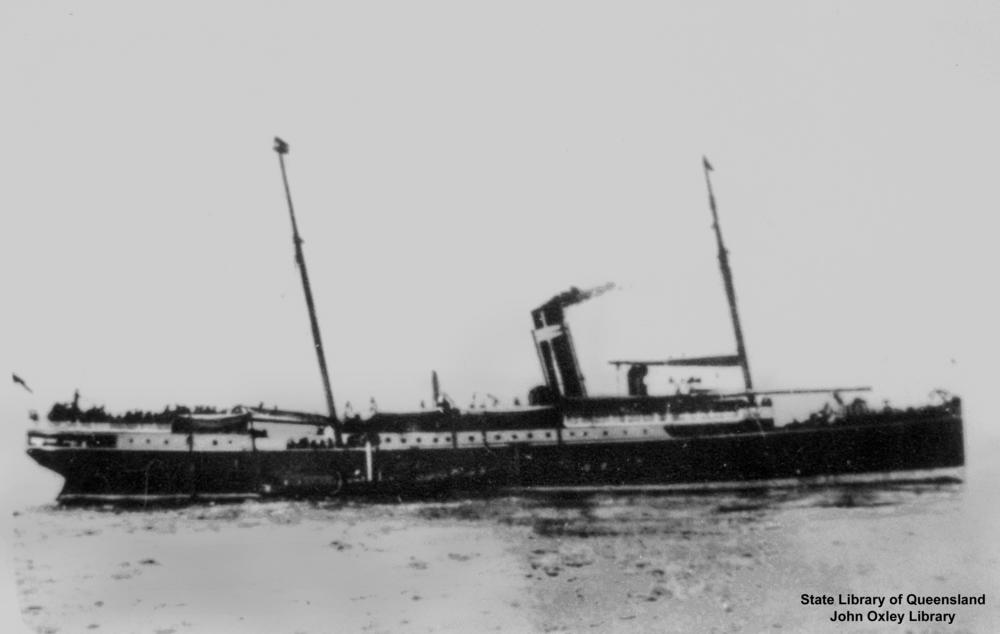
- SS Barcoo

History

Australia
- Name: SS Barcoo
- Namesake: Barcoo River
- Owner: Queensland Steam Shipping Company (1885-1887); Australasian United Steam Navigation Company (1887-1914); Royal Australian Navy (1914-1924)
- Builder: William Denny & Brothers, Dumbarton
- Yard number: 305
- Launched: 10 August 1885
- Fate: Scuttled in 1924

General characteristics
- Tonnage: 1,505 gross register tons
- Length: 250.1 ft (76.23 m)
- Beam: 36.1 ft (11.00 m)
- Draught: 15.5 ft (4.72 m)
- Installed power: 308 hp
- Propulsion: Triple expansion engine

SS Barcoo was a 1,505 gross register ton passenger ship built by William Denny & Brothers, Dumbarton in 1885 for the Queensland Steam Shipping Company. She was transferred upon merger of parent company to the Australasian United Steam Navigation Company in 1857. She was hulked in 1911 and requisitioned by the Royal Australian Navy in 1914 and utilised as a coal hulk in Sydney Harbour.

== Fate ==
Barcoo was scuttled by naval gunfire on 1 February 1924 off Sydney Heads in the Sydney Disposal Area.
