= SS Bingera =

SS Bingera may refer to a number of steamships;

- SS Bingera (1905), a 2,092-ton steamship built in 1905.

== See also ==
- MV Bingera (1935), a 954-ton motor vessel, built by W Denny & Bros., Dumbarton in 1935.
