= SS Hornet =

Coordinates: 33°54.305′S 151°16.569′E

History

Australia
- Name: SS Hornet
- Owner: Australasian Steam Navigation Company, Sydney 1883–1887; Australasian United Steam Navigation Company, Sydney 1887–1914; Thomas Rose (Master), Sydney 1914–1915
- Port of registry: (United Kingdom) Sydney (Pre Federation of Australia); (Australia) Sydney (1901–1915)
- Builder: George Davidson, Pyrmont, Sydney Harbour
- Launched: 4 December 1883
- Completed: 21 April 1884
- Identification: Official number: 89254 Registration No. 39/1884
- Fate: Wrecked off Sydney Heads, 19 March 1915

General characteristics
- Type: Iron screw steamer
- Tonnage: 55 GRT 38 net register tons (NRT)
- Length: 73.4 ft (22.4 m)
- Beam: 15.4 ft (4.7 m)
- Draught: 6.3 ft (1.9 m)
- Installed power: Non-condensing, direct acting, 1 cylinder (10 inches (25 cm)), 10 nhp
- Propulsion: Single screw
- Crew: 3

SS Hornet was a 55-ton iron screw steamer and steam lighter that operated within the Sydney region coastal and harbour waters, Australia, from 1883 until its sinking in 1915. The vessel was constructed as a high-utility harbour tender, the vessel spent over three decades serving Australia's major colonial shipping firms—the Australasian Steam Navigation Company and the Australasian United Steam Navigation Company before being sold into private ownership. In March 1915, while transporting a 400 bags of coke to Botany Bay, the vessel suffered a sudden structural hull failure and foundered off Sydney Heads with the loss of one crew member.

== Ship description and construction ==
=== The ship builder ===
The Hornet was built in 1883 and launched on 4 December 1883 and completed by 21 April 1884 at the Australasian Steam Navigation Company (A.S.N. Co.) Pyrmont Engineering Works shipyards and foundries which were located on the western shores of Darling Harbour in Pyrmont. Specifically, the A.S.N. Co. complex was situated on the foreshore site now occupied by the Australian National Maritime Museum and the Darling Harbour / Pyrmont Bay parklands. The vessel was built under the ASN's superintending engineer the prominent marine engineer and shipbuilder George Davidson.

=== Ship description ===
The vessel's hull was constructed from iron with a single deck and the bridge. The steamer had a single mast fitted as a derrick with an elliptical stern it dimensions were:

Length from foredeck of stem to stern post was 73.4 ft (22.37 m)
Main Breadth to outside plank 15.4 ft (4.69 m)
Depth of Hold from tonnage deck to ceiling at amidships 6.3 ft (1.92 m)
Length of Engine Room 15.7 feet (4.79 m)

The vessel had a 55.22 gross register tons (GRT) and a 37.55 net register tons (NRT) when first manufactured.The Steamer was registered by the Sydney marine registry in April 1884 under official British shipping identifier 89254 and registration code 39/1884.

==== Propulsion ====
The vessel was configured around a single screw propeller and was powered by a compact, direct acting, non-condensing steam engine made by Bow, McLachlan and Company of 10 nominal horsepower, featuring a single cylinder measuring 10 in (25.4 cm) in diameter and stroke of 12 in (30.5 cm).

== Service history ==
=== Australasian Steam Navigation Company (1883–1887) ===
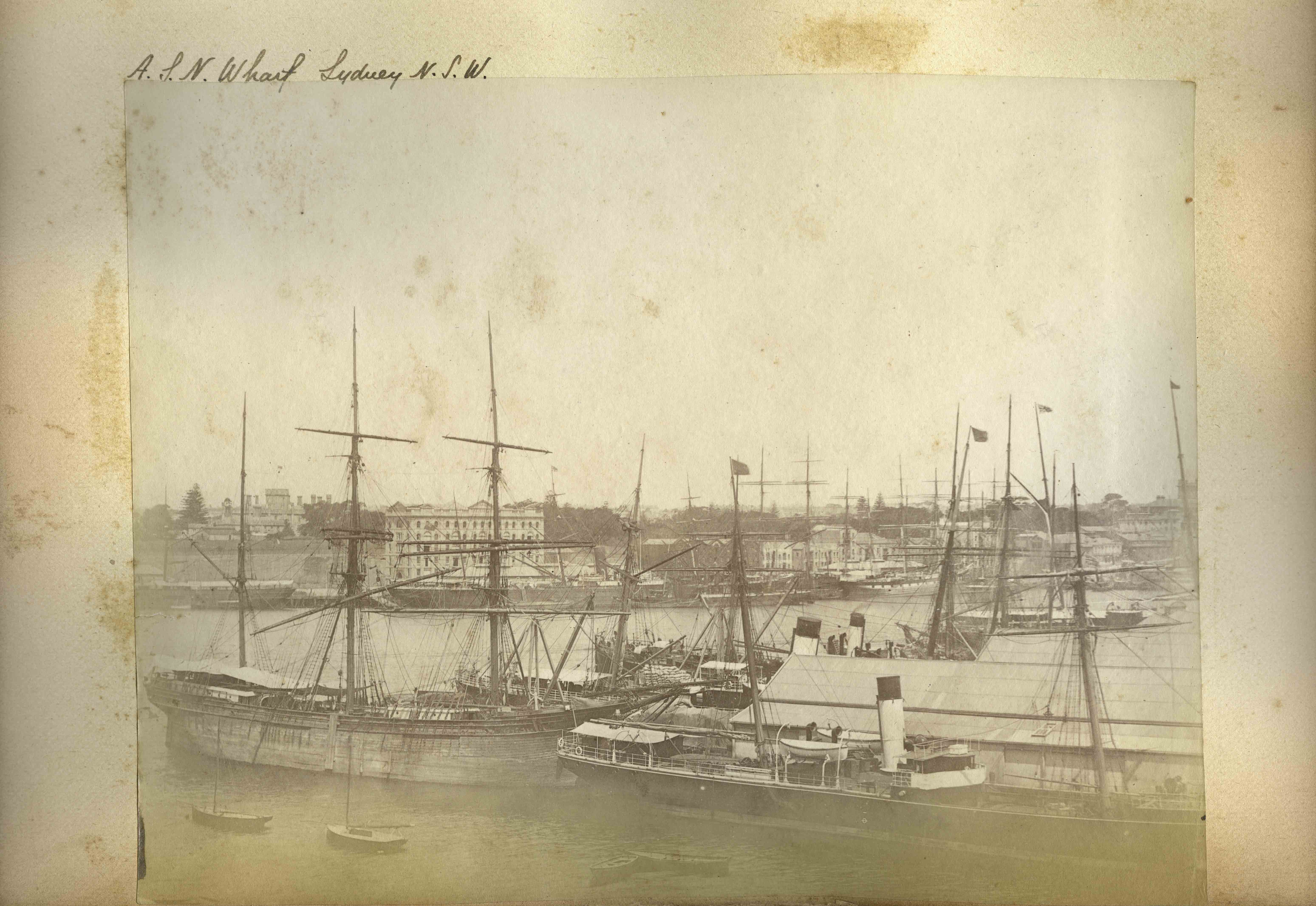
The Australasian Steam Navigation Company (A.S.N. Co.) wharf c 1880s

Following its construction, the Hornet was integrated into the fleet of the Australasian Steam Navigation Company (A.S.N. Co.) to operate as a heavy-capacity steam cargo lighter. Its primary function was navigating transshipments and supply coastal and international steamers anchored away from the company's wharves.

On 30 July 1884, the Hornet was involved in an accident off Dawes Point when it accidentally ran down a small rowing dinghy. While the dinghy was entirely smashed, the lone occupant was successfully pulled from the harbour waters by the lighter's crew without suffering serious injury.

By December 1886, corporate infrastructure reviews documented the Hornet as one of the permanent core utility steam lighters within the active fleet assets of the A.S.N. Co.

=== Australasian United Steam Navigation Company (1887–1914) ===
In February 1887, following a large-scale corporate consolidation of Australian shipping lines, the assets of the A.S.N. Co. merged into the newly established Australasian United Steam Navigation Company (A.U.S.N. Co.), seamlessly transferring the ownership and daily operations of the Hornet. Under the management of the A.U.S.N. Co., the lighter maintained a heavy, continuous schedule of port-bound cargo duties as part of the A.U.S.N. Co. so called "mosquito fleet" of smaller auxiliary vessels, flat-bottomed barges, and steam lighters throughout the 1890s.

The vessel occasionally participated in local community and sporting logistics. In August 1899, company manager James A. Fitzsimons authorized the use of the Hornet to assist the Balmain Rowing Club. Two newly constructed outrigged practice fours, built by Edwards and Son of Melbourne, arrived in Sydney aboard the major company liner Wodonga. The Hornet took the fragile racing craft directly on board and successfully delivered them across the harbour to the club's private water sheds without a scratch.

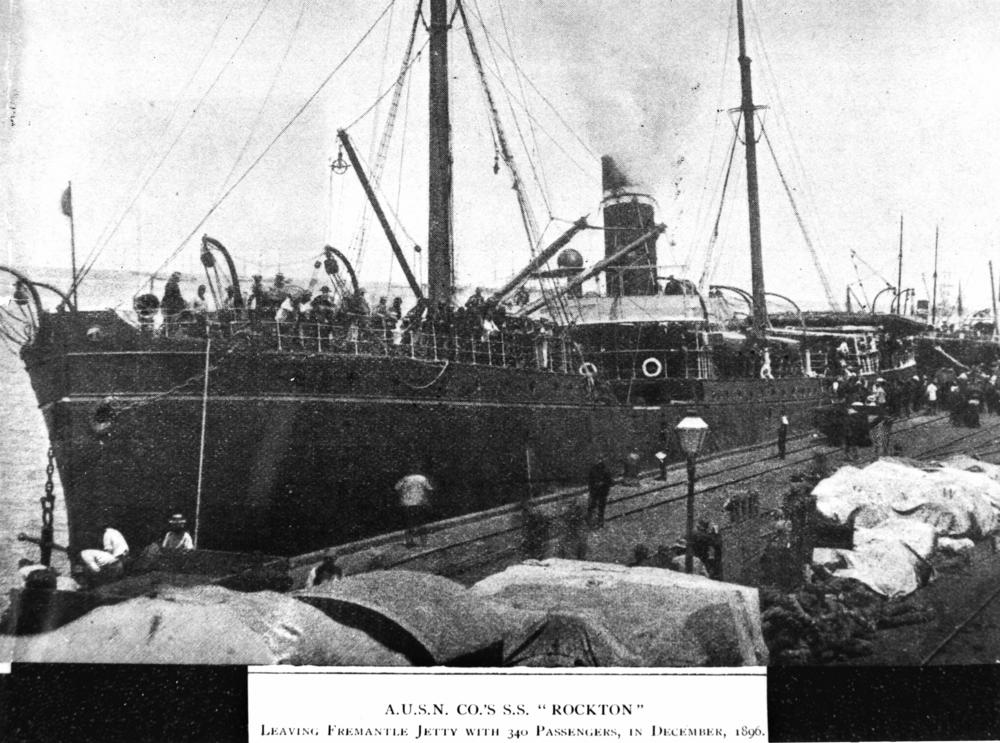
The Steamer Rockton where seaman Peter Donaldson was climbing a wire stay near that ship's funnel lost his footing and fell to his death

In October 1899, the crew of the Hornet became primary witnesses to a fatal industrial accident in the port. While the lighter was tied up alongside the passenger steamer Rockton, a seaman Peter Donaldson was climbing a wire stay near that ship's funnel lost his footing and fell onto an iron deck grating. William Fife, a seaman working on the deck of the Hornet, provided vital eyewitness testimony detailing the fatal fall during the subsequent coroner's inquest.

By 1911 AUSN's Master W Sergers was said to have mastered the Hornet for 17 years.

In early 1913 at the AUSN. Co's workshops, and ship-repair slips along the Brisbane River at Kangaroo Point the company had begun constructing the steam lighter Centipede, which was intended to replace the Hornet the new vessel was along much the same lines but larger

In August 1914 the A.U.S.N. Co. retired and sold the vessel into private ownership.

=== Private operation - Thomas Rose (1914–1915) ===
Thomas Rose brought the vessel on the 20 November 1914 and had it mortgaged to James Thomas Dowdell for 150 pounds with an interest rate of 10% p.a. Rose had worked on or around the Hornet for a number of years prior to its purchase as a master and engineer for AUSN Sydney Harbour lighter Wasp along side the Hornet in 1911. Rose had previously survived the sinking of the Kingsley as a second engineer when it had ran onto Fisherman’s Reef during a dense fog and was washed on to Crayfish Beach, Port Stephens, Morna Point.

== Shipwreck and loss ==
=== Shipwreck ===
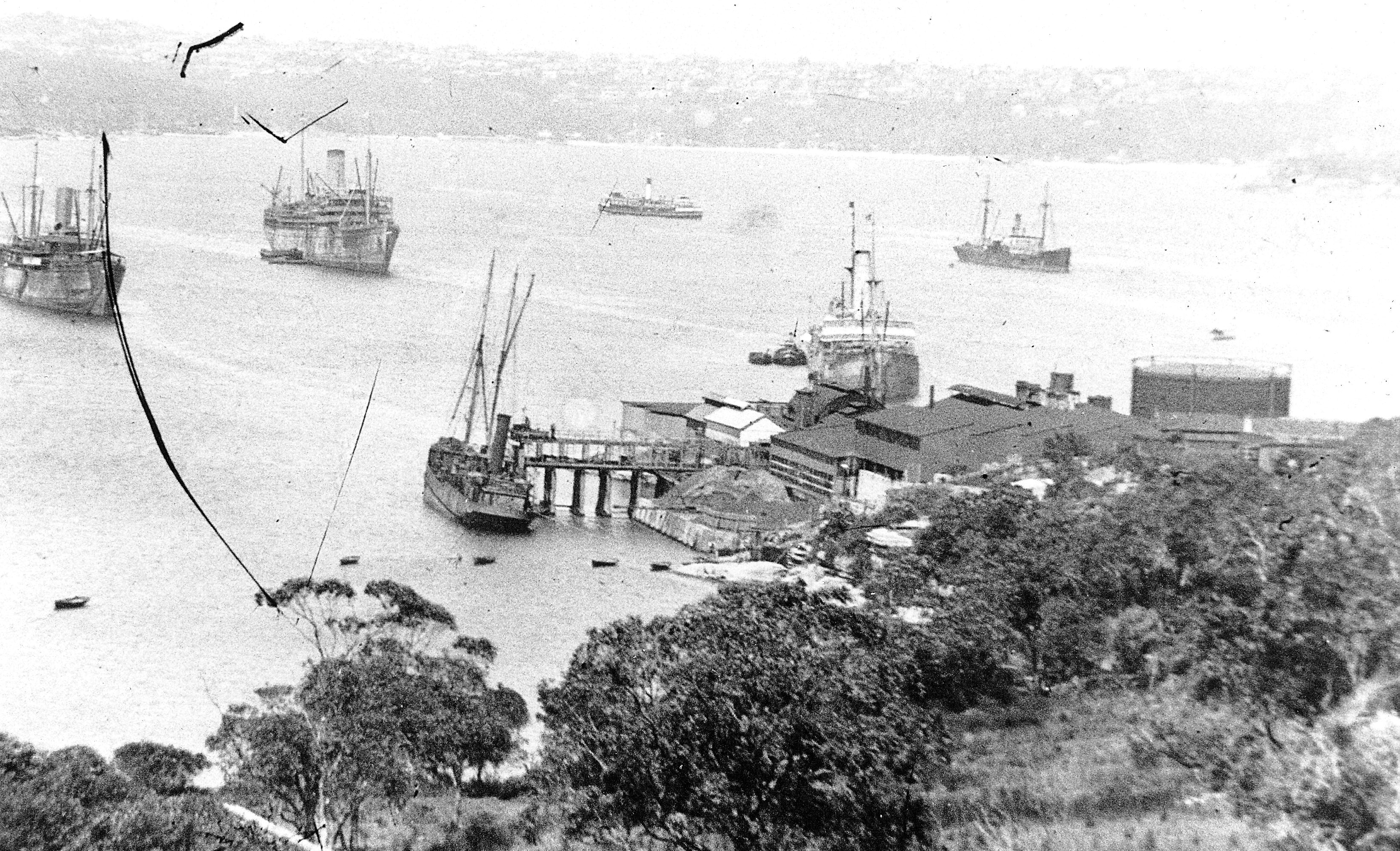
Manly Gasworks c. 1918 where the Hornet was loaded

On a Friday afternoon 19 March 1915, just 4 months after Rose had purchased the vessel, the steam lighter Hornet foundered in a choppy sea along the coast of New South Wales. The little vessel had set forth on her journey loaded with a cargo of 40 tons of coke packed in 900 bags, which was being transported from the Manly Gas Works where the vessel had loaded alongside the Manly baths. Everything progressed smoothly for the crew until the vessel cleared the Sydney Heads at 3:35 p.m., heading southward toward her destination at Botany Bay. A strong nor'-easterly to north-east wind had been blowing during the afternoon, which worked up a moderately heavy and choppy sea against the vessel's journey.

The disaster began to unfold when the vessel was roughly two miles to the southward of the port. A severe leak suddenly broke out, with water found to be rushing rapidly into the lighter just over her propeller. The owner of the vessel explained that the bolts in the stern gland of the steamer likely broke apart, which caused the stem to open out and allow a sudden, uncontrollable rush of water to enter. The crew (the owner and 2 stokers John Boake and Tait) made desperate efforts to bail the rising water out of the engine room and keep the leak under control, but their actions proved entirely fruitless. As the water rose, the vessel's fires were completely put out, causing the lighter to lose headway. In a final attempt to lighten the ship, the crew jettisoned about 500 bags of coke, but within a few minutes, all hope of saving the vessel was entirely abandoned.

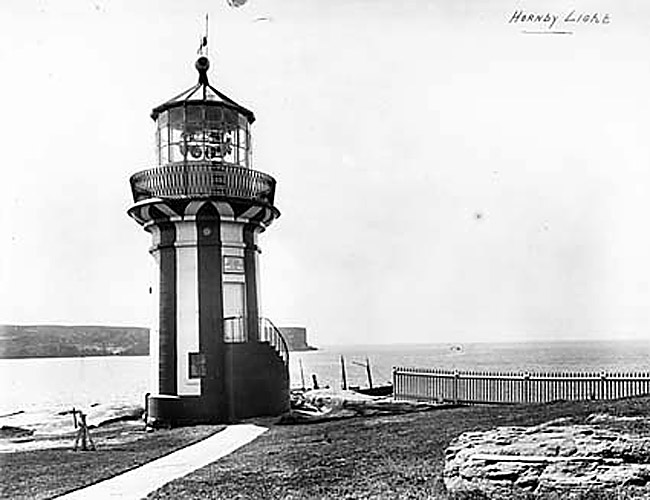
South Head Signal Station AKA Hornby Lighthouse

The plight of the sinking vessel was witnessed by a large crowd of people gathered on the coastal cliffs, who watched the ship make its final battle against the rising waves. From the sinking vessel, a white shirt was waved into the air to attract attention. This distress sign was noticed by Mr. Alfred Gibson, the signal master stationed at South Head Signal Station. Recognizing that the ship was in perilous danger, the signal master immediately communicated to the pilot steamer Captain Cook to proceed out to sea to the vessel's assistance. Slipping her buoy, the Captain Cook quickly rounded South Reef and raced southward toward the distressed crew.

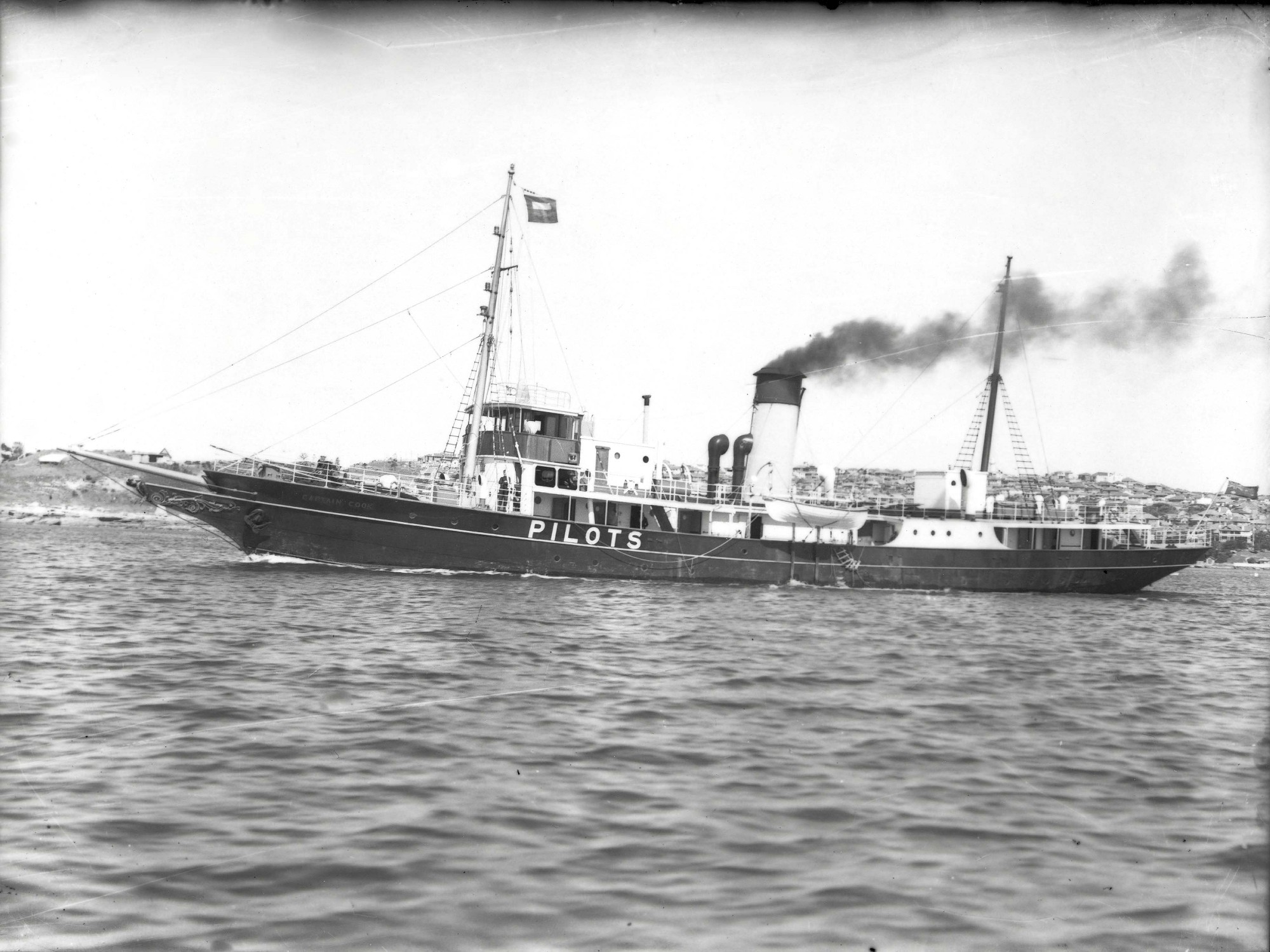
The rescue vessel the pilot vessel Captain Cook II

As the Sydney pilot vessel Captain Cook II arrived close alongside within two boats' length, Captain Sweet of Captain Cook II quickly had a smaller rescue boat lowered into the water. By this time, the Hornet was fast settling down, and just as the rescue boat was pulling toward her, the lighter gave a sudden lurch, tumbled over on her beam ends, and dived head-first and stern-first into the bottom. The ship went down so suddenly that the shouting crew from the pilot steamer rang out, "Jump for your lives!" The three crew members went down into the water with the vessel.

Two of the men struggled in the moderately heavy sea and came to the surface immediately, where they were quickly hauled into the rescue boat. However, the stoker, Tait, a single man of about 45 years of age hesitated before jumping and became completely exhausted just before the rescuing steamer arrived. He was taken down by the vortex, sank, and was not seen again. The Captain Cook and the smaller boat cruised and searched the vicinity for a long time, but all efforts were to no avail. The two survivors were subsequently landed at Watsons Bay, apparently none the worse for their experience, and returned to town via the ferry boat.

=== Marine Court of Inquiry ===
A Marine Court of Inquiry was held over 6 and 7 of April 1915, presided over by Judge Backhouse alongside assessors Captain J. J. Allan and Captain J. Simpson, investigated the circumstances surrounding the foundering of the steam lighter Hornet. Representing the Navigation Department, Mr. Robison from the Crown Law Office explained that the authorities had no prior knowledge of the voyage and were unable to detain the vessel because it completely lacked a seagoing certificate.

The court’s findings heavily focused on the dangerous issue of divided administrative authority. Owner Thomas William Rose testified that he believed the voyage was lawful because he held a military pass to cross the Heads and a clearance ticket from the Customs Department. Judge Backhouse strongly condemned this systemic confusion, stating it was extraordinary for Customs to issue clearances without verifying a vessel's fitness. He declared that sending such an unseaworthy boat to sea was a serious matter that could have easily led to manslaughter charges.

Ultimately, the court ruled that the Hornet was entirely unfit for sea and naturally opened out when encountering sea-waves. Furthermore, His Honor openly doubted whether the required life-saving dinghy was actually on board. Because the master, John Tait, was drowned, the court noted it could not formally deal with anyone’s certificate. The inquiry concluded by finding that the crew did everything they could, but were left working with very bad material.

== Wreck location and wreckage ==
It is believed that the wreck location was discovered by Australian Navy Operations in the 1970s or 1980s as it is believed it may have been dived as part of charts in the possession of both Rob Cason and Steven Carruthers known as the “letter wrecks”. Unfortunately its location has now become lost again.

The sub-surface remains of the iron hull rest on the ocean floor located roughly four miles south of Sydney Heads. The site is protected under the historic shipwreck provisions of the federal Historic Shipwrecks Act 1976.

== See also ==
- Australasian Steam Navigation Company
- Australasian United Steam Navigation Company
- List of shipwrecks of Australia
