= Bishop Island (disambiguation) =

Bishop Island may refer to:

- Bishop Island, in Nunavut, Canada
- Bishop Island (Queensland), in Queensland, Australia
- Manoel Island, in Gżira, Malta, formerly known as il-Gżira tal-Isqof (Bishop's Island)

== See also ==
- Bishop and Clerk Islets, in the Australian Antarctica
- Bishops and Clerks in Wales
- Bishop Rock, Isles of Scilly, off Cornwall, England
- Watergrasshill, a village in County Cork, Ireland with a townland called Bishop's Island
