= Historicus =

Historicus is Latin for historical.

As a pseudonym, it may also refer to:

- Benjamin Franklin (1706–1790), American polymath and statesman
- David McKee Wright (1869–1928), Irish-born poet and journalist
- Albert Jay Nock (1870-1945), American author and social critic
- Fred Rhodes (1877–1964), Australian journalist and author
- Eva Tenison (1880-1961), British historian and novelist
