= Fred Rhodes (writer) =

Australian master mariner, journalist, author and cotton farming lobbyist

- Born: May 2, 1877; Dudley, Staffordshire, England
- Died: June 18, 1964; Brisbane, Queensland, Australia
- Other name: Captain Frederick Rhodes
- Occupations: Mariner, journalist, author, cotton farming advocate
- Known for: Pageant of the Pacific; editorial work in Rockhampton
- Spouse: Edith May Thomas

Captain Frederick (Fred) Rhodes (2 May 1877 – 18 June 1964) was an Australian master mariner, journalist, author and cotton farming lobbyist.

== Early life ==
Rhodes was born on 2 May 1877 in the English town of Dudley, Staffordshire, shortly before his family migrated to New Zealand where he began his primary education in Auckland. He was a cousin of British businessman and politician Cecil Rhodes, who served as Prime Minister of Cape Colony from 1890 until 1896.

== Seafaring ==
=== Early seafaring career ===
Rhodes began his seafaring career as a midshipman with the British-India Steam Navigation Company, where he qualified as a master, before he captained the SS Bingera, a mail-carrying steamship servicing the Queensland coast, owned by the Australian United Steam Navigation Company, where he obtained an additional master's ticket.

Between 1910 and 1916, Rhodes worked as a harbourmaster in Cairns, Townsville and Cleveland Bay.

Rhodes was working in Townsville when the SS Yongala went missing in March 1911 with 122 people on board. Rhodes was part of a group of seamen who went out in search of any survivors. He and his party retrieved a basket of mail, some luggage and half of an ornate smoking room door. Rhodes later said that the belief that no trace of the Yongala was found was false as debris had been littering the ocean between Cape Bowling Green and Palm Island.

=== World War I ===
Rhodes served in World War I, but had been unsuccessful in his attempts to convince the Royal Australian Navy that his maritime experience could be useful to them. He instead reluctantly enlisted in the Australian Imperial Force, but did write a letter to the Chief Recruiting Officer in England outlining his experience and enquiring as to whether England needed any deep sea mariners.

Upon reaching Salisbury Plain, Rhodes was instantly procured by the British naval authorities on the orders of Winston Churchill. He was appointed navy lieutenant, serving as a convoy officer at Bizerte, before being transferred to Otranto Barrage.

In 1925, Rhodes helped organise a Returned Soldier's Reunion event in Rockhampton where returned diggers could gather for one night, socialise with others who had served and talk about their respective war experiences.

=== Post-war seafaring career ===
After serving in the war, he was appointed harbourmaster in Rockhampton in 1919.

He remained as Rockhampton Harbourmaster until 1921 when he was notified of his pending transferral to Thursday Island. Rhodes considered the move a backward step in his career which would have offered a lower salary, and thus decided to resign and remain in Rockhampton.

Rhodes took the view that the attempt to transfer him was the result of opposition to a protest speech he had made at a local branch meeting of the National Party where he spoke out against the Theodore Labor government's plans to abolish Queensland's Upper House, stating that the attempt to "bury" him on Thursday Island was the "reward" for not thinking similarly to the "alleged" democratic Labor government.

The controversy surrounding Rhodes' resignation prompted heated exchanges between Rhodes and Queensland treasurer John Fihelly in the press

Local Rockhampton newspaper The Morning Bulletin criticised the statements made by Fihelly who had claimed that there was a need for a good officer at Thursday Island. The newspaper opined that if that indeed was accurate, the lower salary offered to Rhodes for being a "good officer" was an "extraordinary" way to reward someone.

The newspaper also took to task the Queensland premier Ted Theodore who had claimed in 1919 that Rhodes had not been "detrimentally affected" by his original transfer from Townsville to Rockhampton. The newspaper accused Theodore of either not knowing what he was talking about or not meaning what he said, and published the salary comparisons between the Townsville, Rockhampton and Thursday Island jobs, which revealed Rhodes had accepted a lower salary when he was transferred to Rockhampton and would have been forced to take another pay cut had he accepted the transfer to Thursday Island.

The Morning Bulletin also described Fihelly's suggestion that Rhodes was being sent to Thursday Island to be tested as "grotesque", given Rhodes already had a proven record after being in charge of three of the largest ports in Queensland during the previous decade. The Morning Bulletin also stated that Fihelly seemed to have deep resentment for an officer he had only met once.

=== Willis Island Weather Station ===
Throughout the last couple of years of Rhodes working as a harbourmaster, he lobbied the government to establish a weather station on Willis Island. Rhodes was eventually rewarded in 1921 when weather monitoring equipment was erected on the island. The Daily Commercial News and Shipping praised Rhodes' persistence in his quest to make shipping off the North Queensland coast safer during cyclone season, despite repeated "cold douches" by Federal Government departments.

In his mission to get the weather station established, Rhodes wrote to sea captains, shipping companies and the Queensland Chamber of Commerce, and inundated Queensland newspapers with "propaganda" about his proposal, which they agreed to publish. Rhodes then sent copies of newspaper articles to Federal MPs on a frequent basis, with Rhodes imploring them to help.

The Federal Government finally agreed to explore the viability of the proposal, sending an expedition to Willis Island. Rhodes was initially not invited, but was finally granted permission to travel with the official party. Rhodes was said to have received many letters of support from fellow mariners after the Federal Government finally agreed to commence weather monitoring on Willis Island.

== Politics ==
Rhodes had a strong interest in politics throughout his life.

After choosing to remain in Rockhampton, Rhodes nominated for preselection for the Nationalist Party of Australia's Senate vacancy in 1922 caused by the apparent suicide of John Adamson but missed by just one vote, defeated by local merchant William George Thompson.

Rhodes subsequently became involved with the newly formed state branch of the Nationalist Party called the United Party.

He was appointed to the United Party's campaign committee, working to promote the local United Party candidate (and Rockhampton mayor) William Charlton as the potential state Member for Rockhampton at the by-election held in February 1923, triggered by the resignation of Frank Forde who moved into Federal politics. The Rockhampton by-election was held just three months before the 1923 state election.

However, Rhodes resigned from the campaign committee due to disagreeing with the "tactics indulged in" and the "lack of discipline" concerning allegations made by some people associated with the United Party regarding the private life of Labor Party candidate George Farrell.

Rhodes' decision to resign came after it was claimed a woman had been paid to visit Rockhampton and accuse Farrell of being the father of her two-year-old child, allegedly part of a smear campaign designed to benefit Charlton.

In statements delivered during the scandal, Farrell praised Rhodes for believing in "fair play" and for not standing to see "dirty business going on".

In 1925, Rhodes became the secretary of a newly formed Constitutional Club in Rockhampton, which was established to encourage a greater interest in social and political affairs and to promote the cause of constitutional government as well as the development of industrial resources in Australia.

== Cotton farming advocacy ==
During his career, Rhodes was associated with cotton farming, both as a journalist and as a member of the Cotton Growers Union, serving as the organisation's provincial secretary and working to promote the cotton farming industry as an agricultural alternative to cattle farming in Central Queensland.

In 1923, Rhodes became a co-founder and managing director of the Cotton Farming Publishing Company which had the object of continuing the publication of monthly journal The Cotton Farmer. Following a collapse of the cattle market, dryland cotton farming was briefly seen to be a saviour for beef producers and returning soldiers.

Cotton Farmer was ultimately amalgamated into The Australian Cotton Grower, Farmer and Dairyman in 1925 with Rhodes becoming a local correspondent and agent for the publication.

In association with the Rockhampton Agricultural Society, Rhodes published a pamphlet in 1923 relating to the cotton industry, Central Queensland: the land that clothes millions.

== Writing ==
Among all his endeavours, it is writing that Rhodes is best known for.

Following his decision to stay in Rockhampton, Rhodes began contributing articles to the city's daily newspaper The Morning Bulletin under the pseudonym of Junius.

The subjects of his articles primarily consisted of topics most familiar to him such as nature, seafaring and shipwrecks. His work led to him being invited to join the newspaper staff as the editorial writer, a role which saw him become known for his critical analysis and dynamic style causing some of his editorials to become controversial.

However, Rhodes soon garnered a reputation as a highly respected local journalist who was eventually promoted to the position of associate editor of The Morning Bulletin and editor of its weekly offshoot, The Central Queensland Herald.

It was under the "Junius" pseudonym that Rhodes wrote a serialised fictional story in The Central Queensland Herald called Broadcasting the Tea Race, commencing on 8 November 1934 and concluding on 17 January 1935, which was subsequently published as a standalone compilation.

Rhodes' combined passion of both writing and maritime-related themes led to the publication of arguably his best known work, the two-volume historical work Pageant of the Pacific, published in 1937 which was met with good reviews and praise from those associated with Rhodes' political affiliations including Nationalist Party MP, Sir Donald Charles Cameron who wrote a glowing letter to the editor in The Courier-Mail.

It's believed Rhodes experienced great frustration at continually finding inaccurate historical information during the research for Pageant of the Pacific, which led to Rhodes delivering a stern address on Sydney radio station 2BL pleading for a more authentic record of Australian history.

Rhodes also later criticised schools for teaching students only history relevant only their own states, instead of general Australian history.

Rhodes' interest in history also extended to local history associated pertaining to the Rockhampton and Central Queensland district. Under the pseudonym Historicus, he wrote the Early History: Rockhampton & District and Our History series for The Central Queensland Herald, which commenced in January 1948.

The Morning Bulletin also published two supplementary booklets written by Rhodes relating to Rockhampton's maritime history, Port of Rockhampton: history of its development and A Trip Down the Fitzroy River.

In 1934, Rhodes presented a detailed, two-volume index of Australian maritime history which he had personally collated to the National Library of Australia in Canberra.

== Later life ==
While living in Rockhampton during the 1930s and 1940s, Rhodes was in demand as a guest speaker, and he regularly gave oral presentations on a variety of topics at local community functions organised by the likes of Rotary, the QCWA and the Rockhampton Grammar School.

Rhodes retired from working at The Morning Bulletin in April 1954 and relocated to live in Brisbane, first with his son Frederick Cecil and later with his daughter Lorraine Shirley. At his farewell presentation, he said that his retirement would be busy as he had books he hadn't yet read, and places he hadn't yet seen.

He returned to Rockhampton on a number of occasions for special events such as the dedication of a new church hall and the Rockhampton & District Historical Society opening their office at the Rockhampton School of Arts.

He also continued contributing articles for The Morning Bulletin and The Central Queensland Herald

His wife Edith May Rhodes (née Thomas) died on November 8, 1954. Coincidentally, his son's wife (Vida Joan Rhodes née Queale) also died just over three weeks later, on December 2, 1954.

Rhodes died in Brisbane on 18 June 1964.

== Family ==
Rhodes married Edith May Thomas at All Saints Anglican Church in Brisbane on 10 April 1908.

They had one son, Frederick Cecil Rhodes and an adopted a daughter called Lorraine Shirley. Thomas herself was the adopted daughter of Queensland politician Donald Gunn who served as Member of Carnarvon from 1907 until 1920. Both Frederick and Shirley followed a similar path to their father, with Frederick serving with the marine section of the Royal Australian Air Force, and Lorraine Shirley serving as an Aircraftwoman with the Women's Auxiliary Australian Air Force.

Rhodes' wife Edith was actively involved in the Queensland Society of the Prevention of Cruelty, and was appointed an honorary life member to the organisation in 1939.

== Legacy ==
For his efforts in attempting to correct historical inaccuracies, Rhodes received expressions of gratitude from university professors, librarians and directors of education.

Pageant of the Pacific in particular has been cited as primary and secondary sources in other maritime-related literature.

Australian historian, Dr Lorna McDonald considered Rhodes' contribution to improving Australian history as important work, which helped raise the standards of the subject.

== Bibliography ==
- Central Queensland: The Land That Clothes Millions (1923)
- Australia's maritime history: as shown by a stately pageant of long gone ships (1933)
- Broadcasting The Tea Race (1934)
- Pageant of the Pacific: Pageant of the Pacific: being the maritime history of Australasia (1937)
- Port of Rockhampton: history of its development (1940)
- A Trip Down the Fitzroy River (1940)
- Back to the cross being the case for youth and its heritage (1941)
- Great Papal Criminals – A Biographical Outline of Crimes Committed by the Popes (1940s)
