= Queensland Steam Shipping Company =

Shipping company of Australia

The Queensland Steam Shipping Company (QSS Co) was a shipping company of Australia from 1881 to 1887.

== History ==
House flag used by Queensland Steam Shipping Company

In 1881, the British India Steam Navigation Company was operating a regular mail steamer service from Brisbane to England via the Torres Strait and it wishes to provide coastal services to connect with the mail steamer. The Queensland Steam Shipping Company was formed by the British India Steam Navigation Company with Charles Parbury, James Burns and McIlwraith McEacharn & Company with headquarters in Brisbane. The company was registered in London in August 1881.

Initially the company offers a service from Brisbane to Mackay, Townsville, Cairns, Port Douglas and Cooktown. In September 1882, the company spent £25,000 to purchase the Tasmanian Wharf in Sydney to extend their services to Sydney. Later the company extended their services to Normanton, Burketown, Thursday Island and New Guinea.

On 30 May 1884, two of the company's ships, the Archer and Taldora collided in Moreton Bay. Although it was a serious collision, fortunately there were no deaths or serious injuries. The Marine Board inquiry censured Captain Lowries of the Archer for making in error of judgement in navigation.

The shipping company was amalgamated with the Australasian Steam Navigation Company with their respective vessels in 1887 to form the Australasian United Steam Navigation Company.

== Ships ==
The company's first ship was the SS Gunga (189 tons net).

Later ships were:

- SS Corea (606 tons gross, 382 tons net, built 1883)
- SS Archer (694 tons gross, 440 tons net, built 1883)
- SS Polly (194 tons gross, 89 tons net, built 1883)
- SS Truganini (203 tons gross 130 tons net, built 1876)
- SS Gympie (126 tons net, purchased 1883)
- SS Warrego (1,552 tons gross, 857 tons net, built 1883)
- SS Maranoa (1,505 tons gross, 805 tons net, built 1883)
- SS Barcoo (1,505 tons gross, 745 tons net, built 1885)
- SS Taldora (232 tons gross, 126 tons net, built about 1881–1882)
