= Groper =

Steam dredge

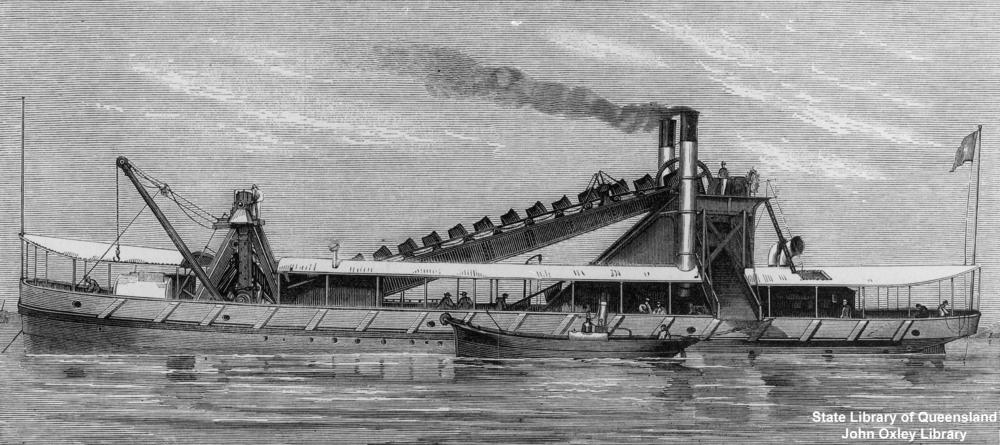

The Groper was a ship commissioned by the Queensland Government in 1875 to dredge rivers. It was built by Thomas Wingate & Company of Whiteinch, Partick, Scotland, and was a large self-propelled bucket ladder dredge, measuring 160 feet in length, weighing 359 tons, and powered by a 75-horsepower steam engine.

== Construction and journey ==
Due to its relatively low power, the Groper was rigged for sail to undertake the journey from Scotland to Australia via the Suez Canal and Torres Strait. Its final sea trial was conducted on March 26, 1876 and it departed from Clyde, Glasgow, on April 1, 1876.

== Operational challenges ==
In January 1877, the Groper was deemed ready for work, but operational challenges arose. The dredge could not operate at full capacity due to incomplete and unavailable punts designed to transport the dredged silt. Instead, smaller punts were temporarily used, and the Groper operated at less than half capacity. Its initial dredging operations focused on the Pinkenba Flats on the north side of the Brisbane River near its entry to Moreton Bay.

== Accident and conflict ==
In May 1877, the Groper experienced an accident, sparking a public conflict between the Queensland Government and Thomas Wingate & Company. Investigations revealed a financial conflict of interest involving the Glasgow engineer, James Deas, the project overseer. He was forced to refund his commission and resigned as a Trustee of The Clyde Trust.

== Later years and retirement ==
In 1916, after decades of service, the Groper reached the end of its working life. It was subsequently converted into a lighter and eventually scuttled in 1949 at the Bishop Island graveyard.
