= Lucinda (steam yacht) =

Paddle steamer built by William Denny and Brothers, used by the Queensland Government

Coordinates: 27.3611°S 153.1789°E

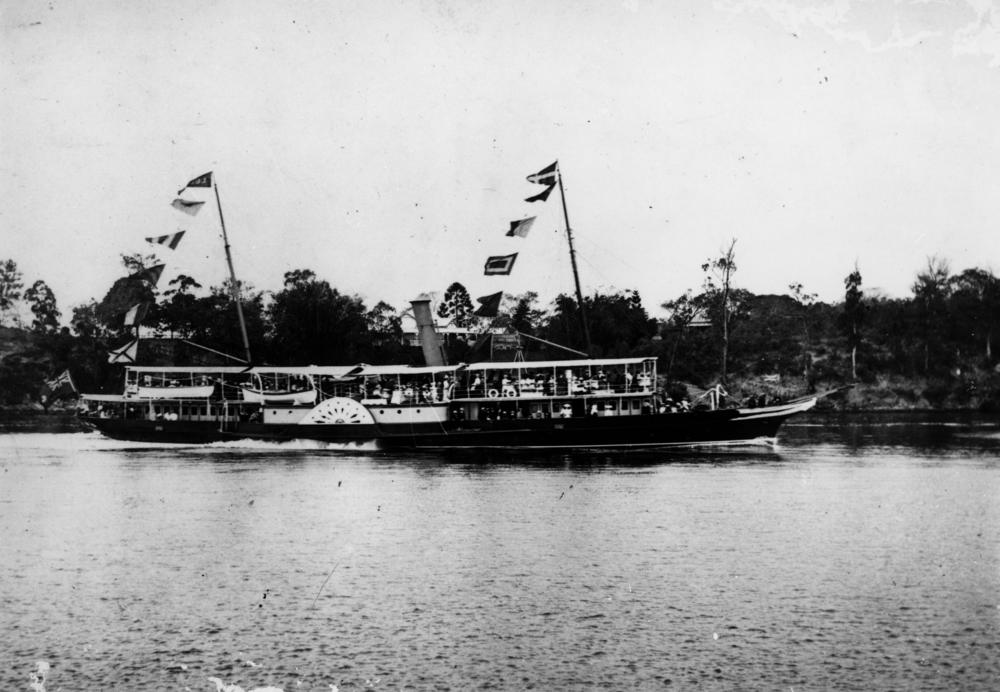
- Lucinda c1885

History

Australia
- Name: Lucinda
- Owner: 1884–1923: Queensland Government; 1923–c1926: Evans, Anderson, Phelan & Co; c1926–1937: Riverside Coal Transport Company
- Builder: William Denny and Brothers, Dumbarton
- Cost: £13,000
- Yard number: 292
- Laid down: 18 April 1884
- Launched: 7 October 1884
- Completed: 20 December 1884
- Fate: Hulked as a breakwater 1937

General characteristics
- Type: Paddle steam yacht
- Tonnage: 301 GRT, 148 NRT
- Length: 172.6 ft (53 m) registered
- Beam: 25.1 ft (8 m)
- Draught: 6.2 ft (2 m)
- Depth: 9.2 ft (3 m)
- Propulsion: steam compound oscillating 114nhp, paddle
- Speed: 12 knots (22 km/h; 14 mph)

Lucinda was a 301-tonne paddle steamer built by William Denny & Bros., Dumbarton, Scotland in 1884. She was owned by the Government of Queensland, and used for pleasure cruises and transporting members of the Queensland Parliament up and down the state’s coast.

== Description ==
The Queensland Government ordered Lucinda from the Scottish shipyard of William Denny & Brothers at Dumbarton in January 1884 to replace an earlier steam yacht Kate from 1864. She was designed as a paddle yacht and lighthouse tender with a steel hull of 180 feet (55 m) length overall, 25 feet (7.6 m) beam and 9 1/2 feet (2.9 m) depth; the steamer measured 301 gross register tons and had a service draught of 6 feet 3 inches (1.91 m). Her two side paddles were powered by an oscillating two-cylinder compound engine of 114 nhp, made by Denny, and she was equipped with electric light. She had a female figurehead and her accommodation was well fitted out. The press reported that "Although technically designated as only as lighthouse tender, the Lucinda is in reality one of the most magnificent upholstered and effectively equipped steamers afloat." The forward saloon was fitted with sofas and could be converted to sleep 20 passengers, while the aft saloon was designed for social events. The specification notes that "an oval shaped deck opening in centre, with stained glass skylight, afforded light and ventilation" and that the "aft part of the deckhouse was fitted up as a ladies' ante-room, with side panels of japanese tapestry." There was also a smoking room in the forward deckhouse.

== Queensland Government Service ==
Lucinda was named in honour of Lady Jeannie Lucinda Musgrave (née Field), second wife of Governor Sir Anthony Musgrave. She was steamed out to Australia via Gibraltar, the Suez Canal, Aden and Batavia, departing the Clyde on 17 January 1885 and arriving at Brisbane on 7 May.

As well as servicing Queensland lighthouses, the steamer was used for ministerial visits along the coast (and to New Guinea on occasion), cabinet meetings on the Brisbane River and Moreton Bay, picnic outings for various associations and annual excursions for school children in the state. Lucinda was also flagship of the Royal Queensland Yacht Squadron, and she was referred to as Queensland Government Steam Yacht (QGSY) Lucinda. Lucinda was used at one time as a mail vessel for delivering mail along the Queensland coast. At that time she was largely captained by Captain James Hodda South (serving with distinction from 17 November 1887 until his retirement with the rank of Commander on 1 May 1907) who notably surveyed/sounded and used South Passage in Moreton Bay to cut hours off the mail route. It was thought by some that this is how South Passage came to be named; however, the name had been given to this Southern Passage about 50 years earlier.

Another captain was Dennis O'Hara Burke 'Dinney' (years of service not known) of Mount Cotton (born in Kinsale, Ireland) who married Mary Ann Hughes in Brisbane in 1903. The helm of "his" ship was preserved for many decades at Newstead House before being transferred to the Queensland Maritime Museum (that this is the correct ship for this helm is currently being confirmed). (Other general information about the Captain that may be of interest: In 1885, Dinney Burke ran Mail Service 344 from Loganholme to Mt Cotton. In later life, he was a farmer and bought about 30 Ayrshire cows in 1933 at the clearing sale at the gaol on St Helena Island. The cows were shipped up the Brisbane River to North Quay and sometime after midnight, on horseback with his daughter-in-law's 2 brothers Sim and Vince Kunde, they "raced at top speed down William Street, across the Victoria Bridge and down Stanley Street charging along the footpaths, under the shop awnings, through the Five Ways at the 'Gabba', along Logan Road and eventually arrived at Mt Cotton". The herd was split at Burke's farm at Mt Cotton and the Kunde's portion herded to their farm at 'California Creek Pocket' on the banks of the Logan River at Loganholme. From 1927 to 1931, the Kunde boys (Ben, Sim, Vince and Joe) ran the Loganholme Ferries until the 'New (now called 'Old') Logan River Bridge' was completed.

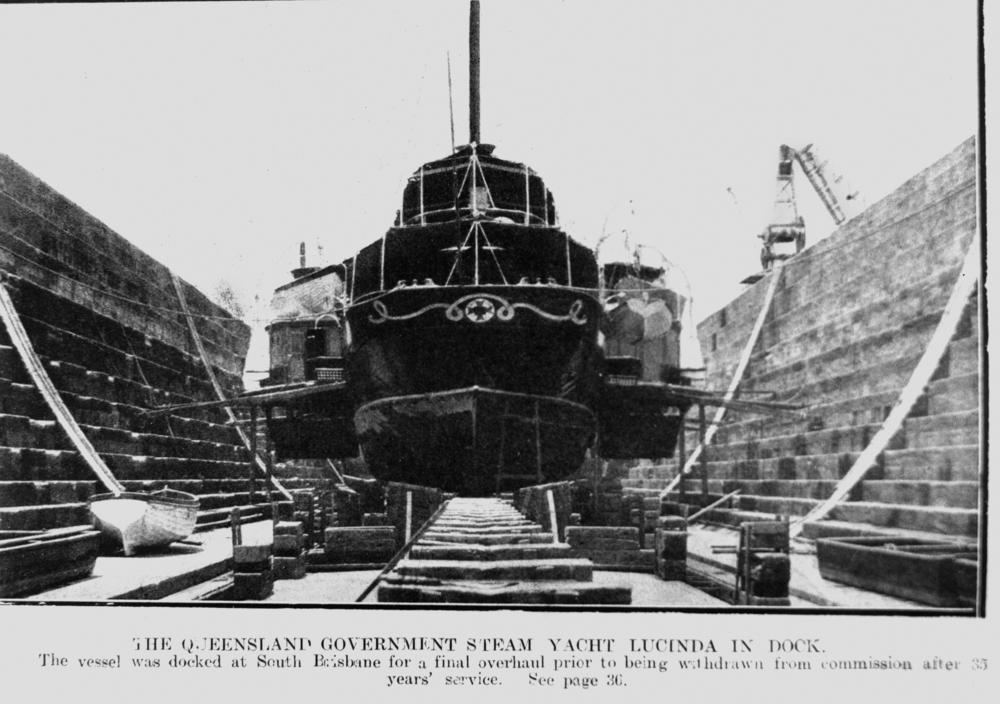
Lucinda in dry dock, 1921

In March 1891, the first National Australian Convention was convened in Sydney, New South Wales to consider a draft constitution for the Commonwealth of Australia. The Queensland Premier, Sir Samuel Griffith, had taken Lucinda to Sydney and, on being elected chairman of the Constitutional Committee, made the yacht available. Between 27 and 29 March, Griffith, the South Australian Charles Kingston and Sir Edmund Barton from New South Wales finalised the draft constitution while cruising on the Hawkesbury River.

In 1896, the ship was involved in the capsize of the ferry Pearl with the loss of 80 to 100 lives. Among later ceremonial occasions was her involvement in the formal arrival in Brisbane of the Duke and Duchess of York (later King George V and Queen Mary) in May 1901.

== Retirement and fate ==
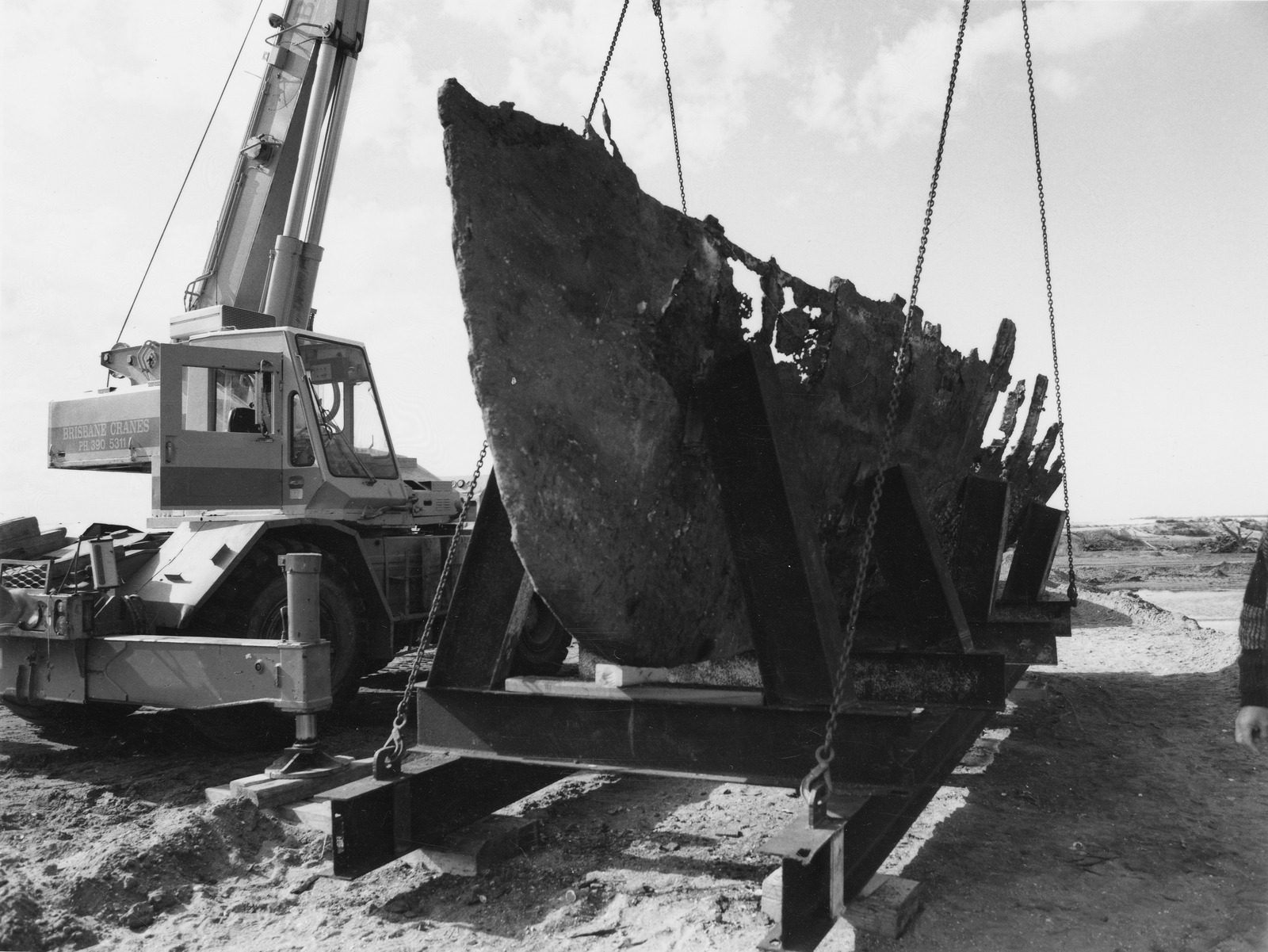
Part of the Lucinda next to a crane during the raising in 1993

In 1921, in view of her age and cost of upkeep, Lucinda was laid up in Brisbane. In 1923 Lucinda was sold for £400 to local engineering company Evans, Anderson, Phelan & Co who partially dismantled her, much of her outfit being auctioned. It is speculated that the table of the Lucinda, which was used by politicians to draft the constitution, was sold for a pound after it was scrapped. Later, in 1926/1927, she became coal lighter for the Riverside Coal Transport Company, who fitted conveyors and a bucket elevator for mechanised discharge, using her to carry coal from Ipswich to Brisbane.

On 28 January 1937, the vessel was beached on the south east side of Bishop Island at the mouth of the Brisbane River to form a breakwater, after she had been cut down to a bare hull. The hulk was removed in 1993 as part of the expansion of the Port of Brisbane.

The bar and some panelling from the steamer's saloon are retained in the Lucinda Room in Parliament House, Brisbane.
