= Bishop Island (Queensland) =

Former island in Moreton Bay, Queensland

Coordinates: 27.3669°S 153.1833°E

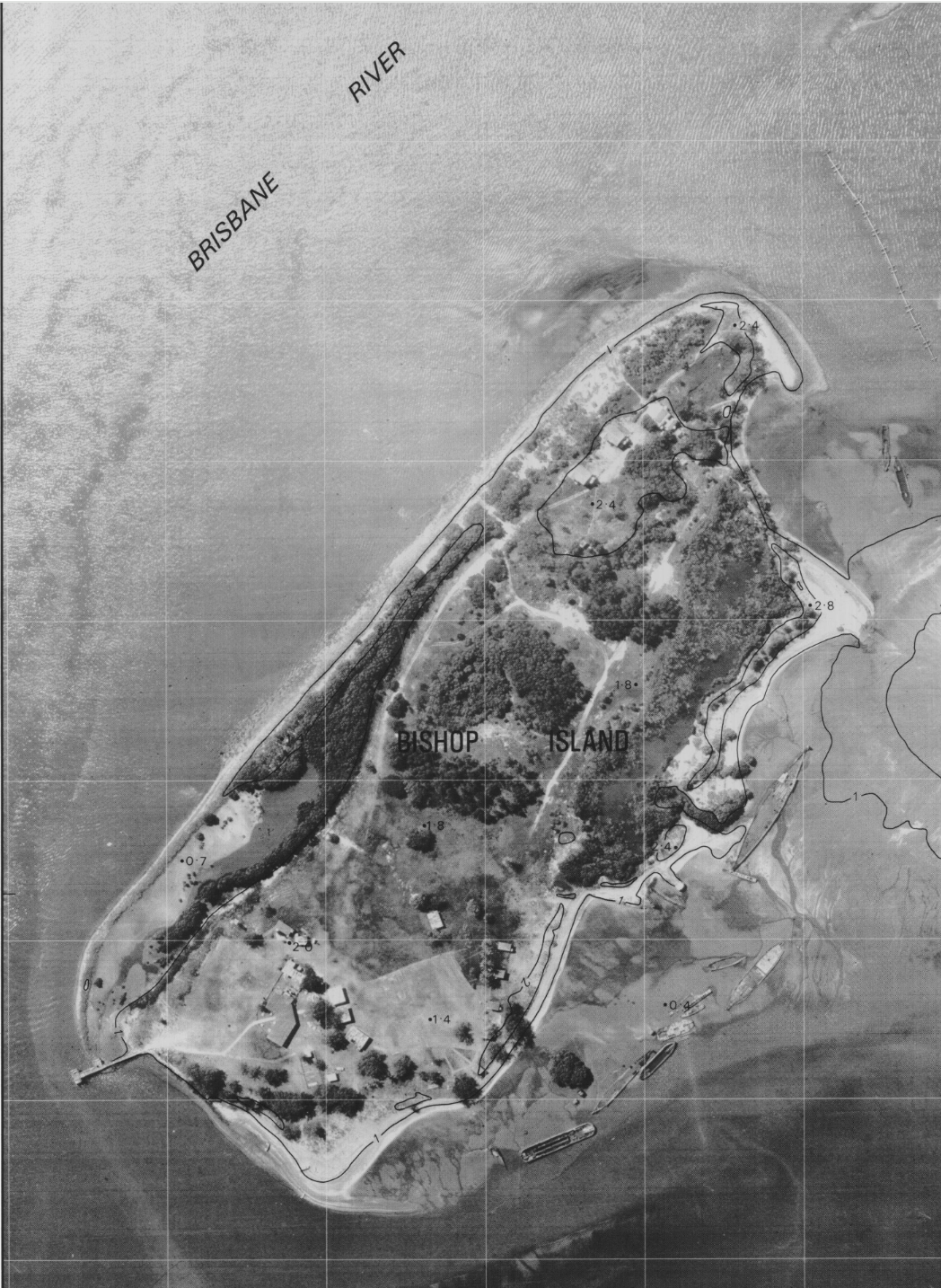
Map of Bishop Island at the mouth of the Brisbane River, 1982 - some wrecks are still visible

Bishop Island was an island near the mouth of the Brisbane River in Moreton Bay, Queensland, Australia.

== History ==
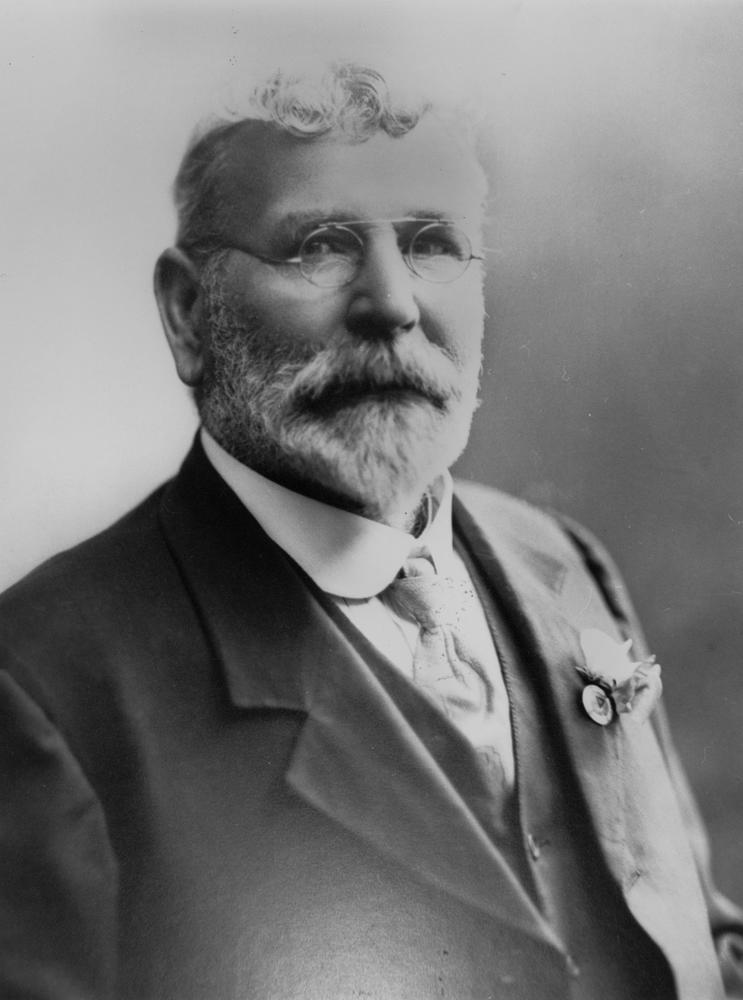
Captain Allan F. G. Bishop

=== Creation of the Island ===
Bishop Island was formed by dredging at the mouth of the Brisbane River between 1909 and 1912. It was named Bishop Island in 1912 after Brisbane dredge master Allan Fitzroy Gordon Bishop, the captain of the dredge Hercules involved in creating the island.

Originally, the Harbour and Rivers Department planned to upgrade the opening of the Brisbane River so that ships can travel through the bay, rather than making a large detour due to sand and mud banks. Captain Bishop thought to reuse leftover dredging mud to create an island from an existing small sandbank.

The dredging of the island was at times difficult and time-consuming. Strong winds would damage equipment and high tides would shift pipes, furthermore, crew members would get stuck in mud It has been speculated that Captain Bishop removed approximately 2200 cubic yards of mud and sand per hour. What drove Bishop to finish the task was the prospect of the island being used as "pleasure resort". When completed, Bishop Island was approximately 32 acres and between 6 and 10 feet above sea level.

At the time of its creation, Bishop Island was one of the biggest man-made islands in the world, and the only man-made island in Australia. Bishop Island was commonly referred at the time as "Hercules Bank" or "Hercules", due to the ship used to create the island. However, "Hercules Bank" was used to also refer to the bank of Bishop Island.

The Hercules was decommissioned in 1952 and placed upon a shore 800 metres from Dunwich, Queensland to be used for oyster farming. The ship was previously trialled to dredge the Suez Canal of limestone and granite in 1900; later also dredging coral from Mud Island for use in cement products after forming Bishop's Island.

=== Ship abandonment and hulks ===
Many ships were dumped on the island, mainly upon the beaches. The Australian United Steam Navigation Company's SS Bingera was dumped in 1926; it was built to provide the mail service between Brisbane, Gladstone and Townsville and became redundant when the railway line to Townsville was completed. The SS Bingera was scrapped of all parts that were sellable and dumped on the beach of Bishop Island, near the Luggage Point outfall.

In 1930, two retired hopper barges were positioned at the northern end of the Island to prevent erosion.

The Queensland Government's steam yacht Lucinda was dumped on 28 January 1937. Other ships that were left abandoned on the island around this time include the Roderick Dhu, a ship primarily used for to bring slaves from Polynesia for use on North Queensland sugar plantations and The Maida. It is also speculated that ship wrecks of old pilot boat The Captain Cook, The Quetta, The Yongala, trader ship The Civility, timber trade ship The Adonis, and The Yosemite, a Chilean barque used for shipping coal, were buried on the beaches of the island. The latter ship was burned on the banks of the island, causing much anxiety for locals who were inundated with black smoke and were not made aware that the ship was to be destroyed in such a way in close proximity to them. Ships were often taken to the beaches of Bishop Island to be burnt in order to salvage the steel from them, another ship that was burnt on the island is the Wandana.

As of 1950, there were at least twelve shipwrecks on the beaches of Bishop Island. These included: The Rhoderic Dhu, Groper, Excelsior, Yosemite, Maida, Schnapper, SS Bingera, Moreton (previously the Lady Lamington), The Queensland, Lucinda and Old Punt. Six years later in 1956, there were 15 wrecks on the island. The Miner, a Queensland defence force minelayer was dumped on the island in 1953.

Due to the abundance of ship wrecks on Bishop Island, it gained the nickname "Wreck Island".

=== Recreational use ===
During the early 1900s, the island was sprawling with vegetation, equipped with a jetty, basketball and tennis court, shelter sheds, cricket pitch and a dance hall. In 1932, two Orders in Council were issued proclaiming Bishop Island to be used for the purposes of the Queensland Native Plants Protection Act 1930 and that all native plants that grow on the island are protected by the same legislation. This legalisation made it illegal to remove or destroy any native plants that grew on Bishop Island. James Crouch, who leased Bishop Island, was made an honorary ranger under the Queensland Native Plants Protection Act 1930 to ensure that the public was abiding by the legislation. Crouch was also made honorary ranger under the Animals and Birds Act 1933 of Bishop Island in 1933.

In late 1933, the Queensland Government proposed closing Bishop's Island to net fishing, a proposal that was resented and protested by the local fishing community of the island. Bishop Island was set up with voting booths for people to vote in the 1938 Queensland state election. In 1938, students were left stranded on Bishop Island after an engine failure on their boat. After spending the night on the island, water police towed their boat back in the morning.

The lighter Mount Elliot sunk near the Bishop Island pilot light after being towed by tugboat The Fearless on 1 February 1939. Subsequently, the Port of Brisbane was closed due to the blockage, which was the first time in history up to that point in time that the port temporarily ceased shipping. At the time, Mount Elliot had 400 tons of coral taken from Mud Island on board. Efforts were made to find a way to raise the ship, however eventually the coral onboard and some pieces of the ship were removed and the hulk was left submerged at the entrance of the Brisbane River.

The island became a popular recreation spot visited by private boats and tourist operators. The island was used for public events such as Sand Garden competitions, carnivals, treasure hunts, Chinese New Year and fishing competitions, as well as a sports club. Steamer, The Gippsland, was bought from Sydney, New South Wales by Bishop Island leaser James Crouch for the purpose of transporting people to the island during the date and for use in shows at night.

The Queensland Government advertised Bishop Island for lease in 1947, as well as an offer for sale. The annual rental price was £60 and the lease term was for five years. The Brisbane City Council proposed building a power station on Bishop Island in 1949, which never came to fruition.

There was a small number of people living on the island. In 1952 there were approximately seven people living including a caretaker and his wife, a pensioner whom lived in a small hut, and signal station employees. There were cabins built on the island for visitors of the island.

In October 1950, Bishop Island was found to be eroding and the middle of the island was sinking. Originally, the island was going to be divided and more mud was to be pumped into the island to stop the shrinking, however a wall was built to stop both the erosion and sinking. The wall was made using stone from Kangaroo Point quarry and was erected on the canal side of the island. The wall was apart for a £16,000 expense from the Department of Harbours and Marines to fix areas of the Brisbane River that were in disrepair.

Due to the erosion of the island, there was great difficulty building homes on the island. Houses were usually moved over from mainland Brisbane to the island already built with furniture inside; in one instance a house was moved onto the island after being transported by boat from Bulimba.

Also in October 1950, the Bishop Island Pile Light was replaced by a temporary shipping reporting station due to damages sustained after collision from the 10,000 ton tanker Wave Commander on 17 October 1949. A rescue team was later called to find the debris of the pilot light. The new signal station cost £1,600 with a £400 subsidy. Later in 1952, a new pilot light was built on the site of the previous one. The building of this pilot light was severely delayed due to harsh seas and a cyclone.

An unidentified male body washed upon Bishop's Island during September 1955; cause of death was rule as a possible heart attack by police.

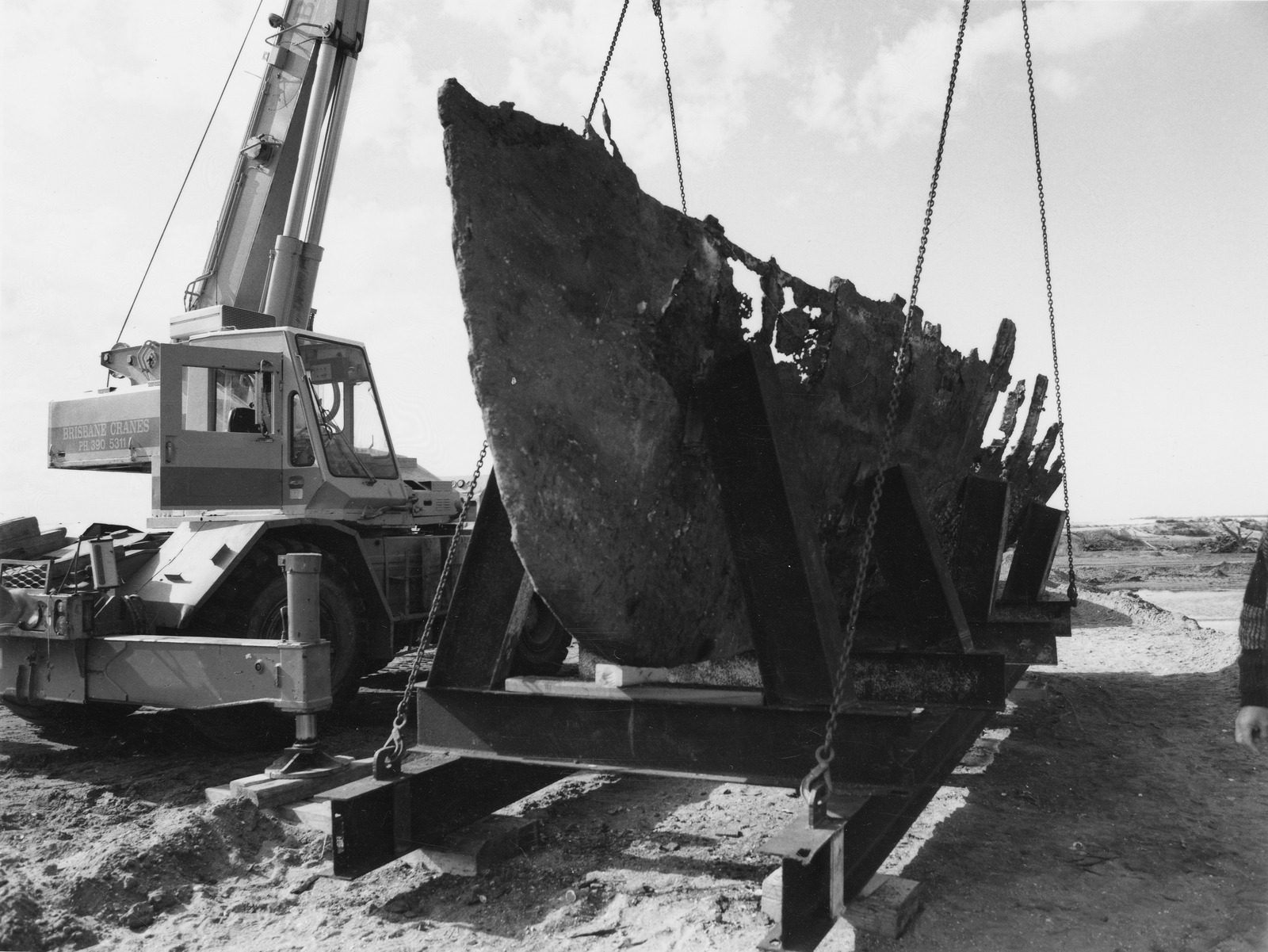
Part of the Lucinda next to a crane during the raising in 1993

=== Integration into the Port of Brisbane and Land Reclamation ===
In 1976, the island was used by the Port of Brisbane. During the early 1990s, port development was underway when munition, including grenades, shells and gas containers, were found by workers during additional land dredging. In 2004, the port expanded through land reclamation in Moreton Bay, resulting in Bishop Island ceasing to exist as an island, becoming part of the mainland port and the Fisherman Islands. The remains of the Lucinda were removed in 1993. In order to continue to commemorate Allan Bishop, on 16 March 2000, the bridge over the Boat Passage to the port was named Captain Bishop Bridge. To cater for increased traffic to the port, in 2010–2011 the bridge was demolished and replaced by a pair of bridges known as the Captain Bishop Bridges.

== Captain Allan Fitzroy Bishop ==
Captain Allan Fitzroy Bishop was born on 29 November 1857 in Doverport, Essex. He became an apprentice at the age 14 in 1871. Captain Bishop first came to Australia in 1872, where he worked on a number of shipping barques.

Bishop was chosen in 1901 to captain the Hercules, which was used to dredge Bishop Island. He was captain of this ship until 1917, when it was decommissioned.

He spent 49 years within the Harbours and Rivers Department of the Queensland Government, before retiring in 1931 at the age of 75. Captain Bishop was a foundation member of the Company of Master Mariners. Captain Bishop died on the 12 August 1950 at the age of 92.
