= SS Bingera (1905) =

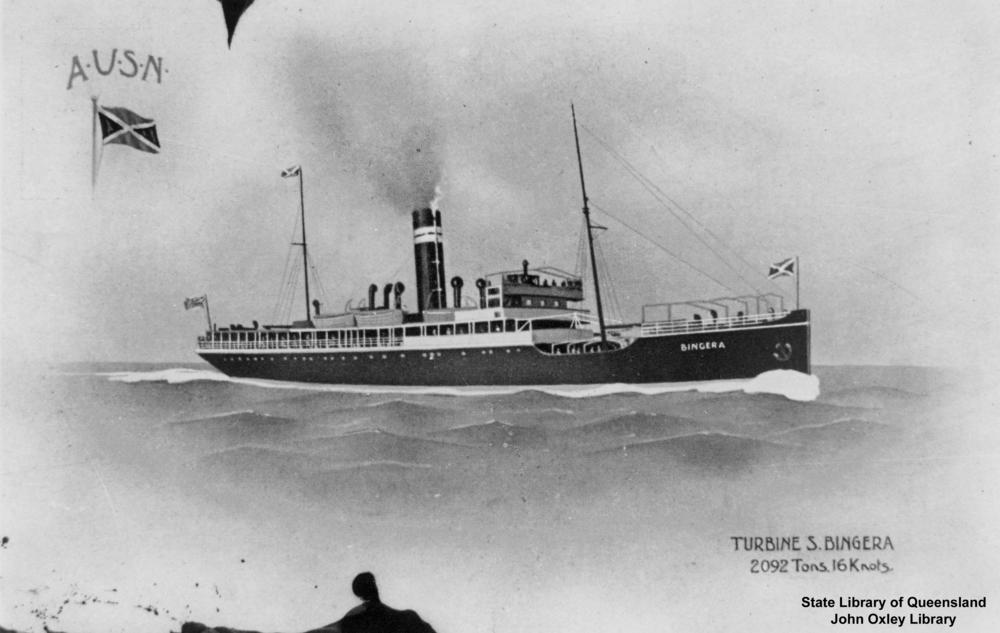

History
- Name: Bingera
- Owner: Australian United Steam Navigation Co
- Builder: Workman, Clark and Company, Belfast
- Launched: 1905
- Fate: Dismantled and hulked after 1926; Completely scrapped by 1961

General characteristics
- Tonnage: 2,092 GRT
- Length: 300 ft 3 in (91.52 m)
- Beam: 40 ft 8 in (12.40 m)
- Depth: 17 ft 9 in (5.41 m)
- Propulsion: Twin screw; Triple expansion engine after 1914

SS Bingera was a steamship that provided the mail service between Brisbane, Gladstone and Townsville in Queensland, Australia.

== History ==
Workman, Clark and Company of Belfast, Ireland built her in 1905 in for the Australian United Steam Navigation Company. She was 2,092 GRT and 300 ft 3 in (91.52 m) long.

The SS Bingera was the first turbine steamer to sail Australian waters.

Once the railway to Townsville was built in 1926, the mail travelled by rail and the ship was therefore no longer needed. On 28 November 1929, she was dumped on the beach of Bishop Island at the mouth of the Brisbane River, (now incorporated into the Port of Brisbane), after all saleable parts were removed.
