= Australasian United Steam Navigation Company =

Australian shipping company of the 19th and 20th centuries

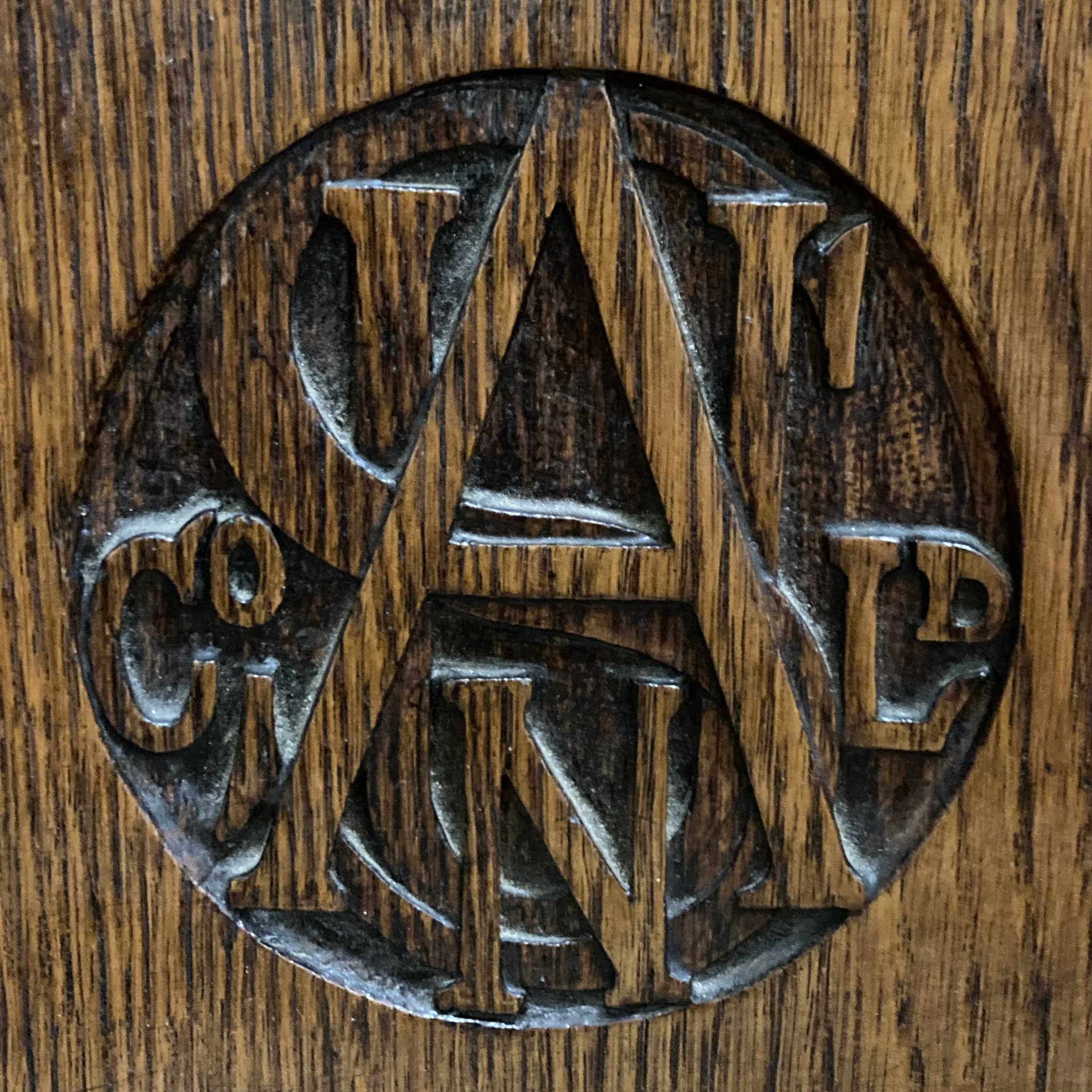
- Logo and monogram of the Australasian United Steam Navigation Company
- Industry: Shipping
- Predecessor: Australasian Steam Navigation Company and the Queensland Steam Shipping Company
- Founded: 1887
- Defunct: 1961
- Headquarters: Brisbane, Australia

House Flag of the Australasian United Steam Navigation Company

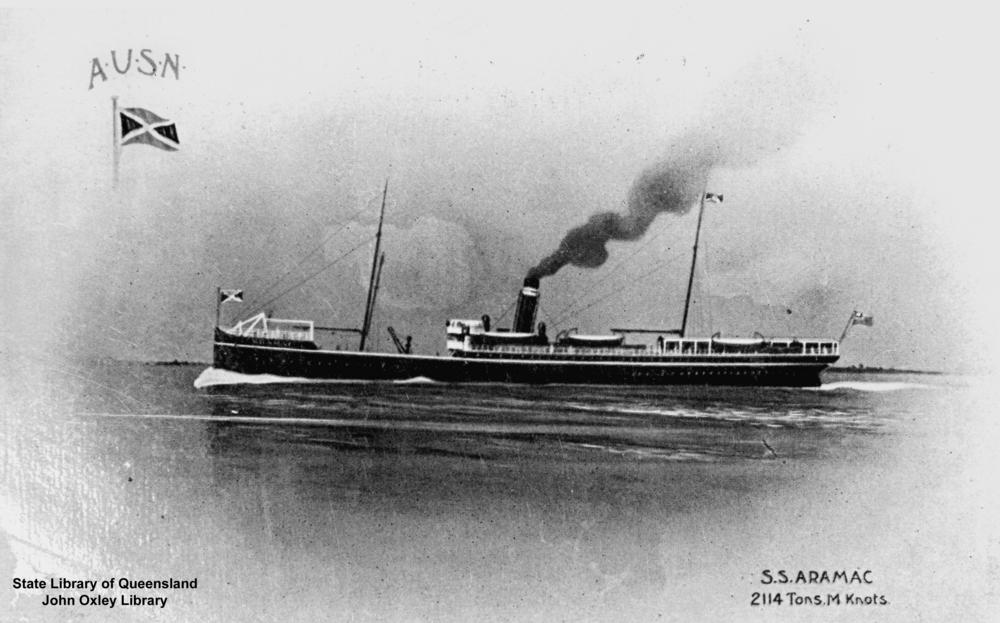
Aramac of the Australian United Steam Navigation Company, built by William Denny and Brothers in Glasgow in 1889 and scuttled in 1929 or 1930

The Australasian United Steam Navigation Company (AUSNC) was an Australian shipping company formed in 1887 by the merger of the Australasian Steam Navigation Company and the Queensland Steam Shipping Company and their fleets. It existed from 1887 to 1961.

One of their former shipping offices, Naldham House, at 193 Mary Street, Brisbane, Queensland is listed in the Queensland Heritage Register.

== Ships ==
The ships operated by the company included Bingera, which operated the mail service between Brisbane, Gladstone and Townsville. She was partly scrapped in 1926 and abandoned on Bishop Island at the mouth of the Brisbane River.
